= List of PlayStation 4 games (M–Z) =

This is a list of games for the PlayStation 4. The PlayStation 4 supports both physical and digital games. Physical games are sold on Blu-ray Disc and digital games can be purchased through the PlayStation Store. (Note: Games dated November 15, 2013 (North America), November 29, 2013 (Europe) and February 22, 2014 (Japan) are launch titles for the specified regions.) See Arcade Archives and Arcade Game Series for a list of emulated arcade games that have been released for the PlayStation 4, and List of PlayStation 2 games for PlayStation 4 for PlayStation 2 games running on PlayStation 4 with an emulator. See List of PlayStation VR games for a larger range of dedicated PlayStation VR games.

== List ==
There are currently 3750 games on this list. (Note: This number is always up to date by this script.)

Key
3D 3D television output	C PS Camera support	CB Supports cross-buy	CP Supports cross-play	M PS Move support	P Pro enhanced	PL PlayLink	VR Virtual Reality support

Title	Genre(s)	Developer(s)	Publisher(s)	Release date			Addons	Ref.
Title	Genre(s)	Developer(s)	Publisher(s)	JP	NA	PAL	Addons	Ref.
Machinarium	Graphic adventure	Amanita Design	Amanita Design	Sep 18, 2016	Sep 1, 2016	Sep 21, 2016		
Mad Games Tycoon	Business simulation	Eggcode	Toplitz Productions	Unreleased	Nov 14, 2019	Nov 12, 2019		
Mad Max	Action-adventure	Avalanche Studios	WB Games	Oct 1, 2015	Sep 1, 2015	Sep 4, 2015		
Mad Rat Dead	Platform; rhythm	Nippon Ichi Software	JP: Nippon Ichi Software; WW: NIS America	Oct 29, 2020	Oct 30, 2020	Oct 30, 2020		
Mad Tower Tycoon	Strategy; simulation	Eggcode	Toplitz Productions	Unreleased	Nov 24, 2020	Nov 24, 2020		
Made in Abyss: Binary Star Falling into Darkness	Action-role playing	Spike Chunsoft	Spike Chunsoft	Sep 1, 2022	Sep 2, 2022	Sep 2, 2022		
Madden NFL 15	Sports	EA Tiburon	Electronic Arts	Unreleased	Aug 26, 2014	Aug 29, 2014		
Madden NFL 16	Sports	EA Tiburon	Electronic Arts	Unreleased	Aug 25, 2015	Aug 25, 2015		
Madden NFL 17	Sports	EA Tiburon	Electronic Arts	Aug 23, 2016	Aug 23, 2016	Aug 23, 2016		
Madden NFL 18	Sports	EA Tiburon	Electronic Arts	Aug 25, 2017	Aug 25, 2017	Aug 25, 2017	P	
Madden NFL 19	Sports	EA Tiburon	Electronic Arts	Aug 10, 2018	Aug 10, 2018	Aug 10, 2018	P	
Madden NFL 20	Sports	EA Tiburon	Electronic Arts	Aug 2, 2019	Aug 2, 2019	Aug 2, 2019	P	
Madden NFL 21	Sports	EA Tiburon	Electronic Arts	Aug 28, 2020	Aug 28, 2020	Aug 28, 2020	P	
Madden NFL 22	Sports	EA Tiburon	Electronic Arts	Aug 20, 2021	Aug 20, 2021	Aug 20, 2021		
Madden NFL 23	Sports	EA Tiburon	Electronic Arts	Aug 19, 2022	Aug 19, 2022	Aug 19, 2022		
Madden NFL 24	Sports	EA Tiburon	Electronic Arts	Aug 18, 2023	Aug 18, 2023	Aug 18, 2023		
Madden NFL 25 (2024)	Sports	EA Tiburon	Electronic Arts	Aug 16, 2024	Aug 16, 2024	Aug 16, 2024		
Madden NFL 25 (2013)	Sports	EA Tiburon	Electronic Arts	Unreleased	Nov 15, 2013	Nov 29, 2013		
Mafia: Definitive Edition	Action-adventure	Hangar 13	2K	Sep 25, 2020	Sep 25, 2020	Sep 25, 2020	P	
Mafia II: Definitive Edition	Action-adventure	Hangar 13	2K	May 20, 2020	May 19, 2020	May 19, 2020	P	
Mafia III: Definitive Edition	Action-adventure	Hangar 13	2K	May 20, 2020	May 19, 2020	May 19, 2020	P	
Mafia III	Action-adventure	Hangar 13	2K	Oct 7, 2016	Oct 7, 2016	Oct 7, 2016		
Mages of Mystralia	Adventure	Borealys Games	Borealys Games	Oct 18, 2018	Aug 22, 2017	Aug 22, 2017		
The Magic Circle: Gold Edition	Sandbox	Question	Question	Unreleased	Jul 9, 2015	Jul 9, 2015		
Magicians Dead: Force of the Soul	Action	Byking	Oizumi Amuzio	TBA	TBA	TBA		
Magicka 2	Action-adventure	Pieces Interactive	Paradox Interactive	Jul 7, 2019	May 26, 2015	May 26, 2015		
Magic Scroll Tactics	Tactical role-playing	Otori Denshi	Mediascape	Apr 10, 2020	Unreleased	Unreleased		
Magic Story Fear and the Mysterious School	Role-playing	Idea Factory	Idea Factory	Nov 28, 2024	Unreleased	Unreleased		
Maglam Lord	Action role-playing	Felistella	JP: D3 Publisher; WW: PQube	Mar 18, 2021	Feb 4, 2022	Feb 4, 2022		
Mahjong	Puzzle	Sanuk Games	Bigben Interactive	Unreleased	Aug 30, 2016	Aug 30, 2016		
The Making of Karateka		Digital Eclipse	Digital Eclipse	Aug 29, 2023	Aug 29, 2023	Aug 29, 2023		
Maldita Castilla EX	Platform	Abylight Studios	Abylight Studios	Dec 16, 2016	Dec 16, 2016	Jan 11, 2017		
Malicious Fallen	Action	Alvion	Sony Interactive Entertainment	Feb 21, 2017	Feb 21, 2017	Feb 21, 2017	P	
Maneater	Action role-playing	Blindside Interactive	Tripwire Interactive	Dec 16, 2020	May 22, 2020	May 22, 2020	CB	
The Manga Works	Simulation	Kairosoft	Kairosoft	May 14, 2020	Unreleased	Unreleased		
Manifold Garden	Puzzle	William Chyr Studio	William Chyr Studio	Unreleased	Aug 18, 2020	Aug 18, 2020		
Mantis Burn Racing	Racing	VooFoo Studios	VooFoo Studios	Jun 28, 2018	Oct 12, 2016	Oct 12, 2016	CP P	
Maquette	Puzzle	Graceful Decay	Annapurna Interactive	Mar 2, 2021	Mar 2, 2021	Mar 2, 2021		
Marchen Forest: Mylne and the Forest Gift	Role-playing	PrimaryOrbit	Clouded Leopard Entertainment	Jan 28, 2021	Jan 28, 2021	Jan 28, 2021		
Marenian Tavern Story: Patty and the Hungry God	Role-playing; turn-based	Rideon	Kemco	Nov 9, 2018	Nov 27, 2018	Aug 18, 2020		
Mark McMorris Infinite Air	Sports	HB Studios	Maximum Games	Unreleased	Oct 25, 2016	Oct 28, 2016		
Marooners	Action, party	M2H	M2H	Feb 6, 2018	Feb 6, 2018	Feb 6, 2018		
Marsupilami: Hoobadventure	Platform	Ocellus Studio	Microids	Nov 16, 2021	Nov 16, 2021	Nov 16, 2021		
Mars Horizon	Strategy; simulation	Auroch Digital	The Irregular Corporation	Unreleased	Nov 17, 2020	Nov 17, 2020		
Martha is Dead	Psychological horror	LKA	Wired Productions	Unreleased	Feb 24, 2022	Feb 24, 2022		
Marvel Heroes Omega	Massively multiplayer online role-playing	Gazillion Entertainment; Secret Identity Studios	Gazillion Entertainment	Jun 30, 2017	Jun 30, 2017	Jun 30, 2017		
Marvel Puzzle Quest: Dark Reign	Puzzle	D3 Go!	Marvel Entertainment	Oct 16, 2015	Oct 16, 2015	Oct 16, 2015		
Marvel Rivals	Third-person shooter; Hero shooter	NetEase Games	NetEase Games	Sep 12, 2025	Sep 12, 2025	Sep 12, 2025		
Marvel: Ultimate Alliance	Action role-playing	Raven Software	Activision	Jul 26, 2016	Jul 26, 2016	Jul 26, 2016		
Marvel: Ultimate Alliance 2	Action role-playing	Raven Software	Activision	Jul 26, 2016	Jul 26, 2016	Jul 26, 2016		
Marvel vs. Capcom: Infinite	Fighting	Capcom	Capcom	Sep 21, 2017	Sep 19, 2017	Sep 19, 2017	P	
Marvel vs. Capcom Fighting Collection: Arcade Classics	Fighting	Capcom	Capcom	Sep 12, 2024	Sep 12, 2024	Sep 12, 2024		
Mary Skelter 2	Action role-playing	Compile Heart	Idea Factory	Jul 12, 2018	Unreleased	Unreleased		
Mary Skelter Finale	Action role-playing	Compile Heart	Idea Factory	Nov 5, 2020	Sep 30, 2021	Oct 1, 2021		
Masquerada: Songs and Shadows	Tactical role-playing	Witching Hour Studios	Ysbryd Games	Unreleased	Aug 8, 2017	Aug 8, 2017		
Mass Effect: Andromeda	Action role-playing	BioWare	Electronic Arts	Unreleased	Mar 21, 2017	Mar 23, 2017	P	
Mass Effect Legendary Edition	Action role-playing	BioWare	Electronic Arts	Unreleased	May 14, 2021	May 14, 2021		
Masters of Anima	Real-time tactics; puzzle	Passtech Games	Focus Home Interactive	Unreleased	Apr 10, 2018	Apr 10, 2018	P	
Matchpoint: Tennis Championships	Sports	Torus Games	Kalypso Media	Jul 7, 2022	Jul 7, 2022	Jul 7, 2022		
Matterfall	Shooter	Housemarque	Sony Computer Entertainment	Aug 17, 2017	Aug 15, 2017	Aug 16, 2017	P	
Max: The Curse of Brotherhood	Platform; puzzle	Press Play	Wired Productions	Unreleased	Nov 10, 2017	Nov 10, 2017		
Mayhem Brawler	Beat 'em up	Hero Concept	Hero Concept	Unreleased	Aug 18, 2021	Aug 18, 2021		
McDroid	Tower defense	Grip Games	Grip Games	Unreleased	Mar 1, 2016	Mar 1, 2016		
The Mean Greens - Plastic Warfare	Third-person shooter	Virtual Basement	Code Headquarters	Unreleased	Aug 5, 2020	Aug 5, 2020		
MediEvil	Hack & slash	Other Ocean Interactive	Sony Computer Interactive	Oct 25, 2019	Oct 25, 2019	Oct 25, 2019	P	
Mega Coin Squad	Platform	Big Pixel Studios	Adult Swim Games	Unreleased	Oct 27, 2015	Jan 26, 2016		
Mega Man 11	Platform	Capcom	Capcom	Oct 4, 2018	Oct 2, 2018	Oct 2, 2018	P	
Mega Man Battle Network Legacy Collection Vol. 1	Role-playing; turn-based	Capcom / NeoBards Entertainment	Capcom	Apr 14, 2023	Apr 14, 2023	Apr 14, 2023		
Mega Man Battle Network Legacy Collection Vol. 2	Role-playing; turn-based	Capcom / NeoBards Entertainment	Capcom	Apr 14, 2023	Apr 14, 2023	Apr 14, 2023		
Mega Man Legacy Collection	Action; platform	Digital Eclipse	Capcom	May 26, 2016	Aug 25, 2015	Aug 25, 2015		
Mega Man: Dual Override	Action; Platform	Capcom	Capcom	2027	2027	2027		
Mega Man Legacy Collection 2	Action; platform	Capcom	Capcom	Aug 8, 2017	Aug 8, 2017	Aug 8, 2017		
Mega Man Star Force Legacy Collection	Role-playing; turn-based	Capcom	Capcom	Mar 27, 2026	Mar 27, 2026	Mar 27, 2026		
Mega Man X Legacy Collection	Action; platform	Capcom	Capcom	Jul 26, 2018	Jul 24, 2018	Jul 24, 2018		
Mega Man X Legacy Collection 2	Action; platform	Capcom	Capcom	Jul 26, 2018	Jul 24, 2018	Jul 24, 2018		
Mega Man Zero/ZX Legacy Collection	Action; platform	Capcom	Capcom	Feb 25, 2020	Feb 25, 2020	Feb 25, 2020		
Megadimension Neptunia VII	Role-playing	Compile Heart	Idea Factory	Apr 23, 2015	Feb 2, 2016	Feb 12, 2016		
Mega Mall Story	Business simulation	Kairosoft	Kairosoft	May 14, 2020	Unreleased	Unreleased		
Megaquarium	Business simulation	Twice Circled	Auroch Digital	Dec 12, 2019	Oct 18, 2019	Oct 18, 2019		
Megaton Rainfall	Action-adventure	Alfonso del Cerro	Pentadimensional	Unreleased	Oct 17, 2017	Oct 17, 2017	VR	
Megaton Musashi	Action role-playing; mech-combat	Level-5	Level-5	Nov 11, 2021	Unreleased	Unreleased		
Mekazoo	Platform	The Good Mood Creators	The Good Mood Creators	Unreleased	Nov 15, 2016	Dec 14, 2016	3D	
Melbits World	Puzzle-platform	Melbot Studios	Melbot Studios	Oct 10, 2019	Nov 14, 2018	Feb 5, 2019	PL	
Melty Blood: Type Lumina	Fighting	French Bread	Delightworks	Sep 30, 2021	Sep 30, 2021	Sep 30, 2021		
A Memoir Blue	Interactive drama	Cloisters Interactive	Annapurna Interactive	Unreleased	TBA	TBA		
Memories Off Historia Vol. 1	Visual novel	Mages	Mages	Mar 25, 2021	Unreleased	Unreleased		
Memories Off Historia Vol. 2	Visual novel	Mages	Mages	Mar 25, 2021	Unreleased	Unreleased		
Memories Off: Innocent Fille	Visual novel	Mages	Mages	Mar 28, 2018	Unreleased	Unreleased		
Mercenaries Blaze: Dawn of the Twin Dragons	Role-playing	Rideon	Rideon	Oct 1, 2020	Unreleased	Unreleased		
Mercenary Kings	Action	Tribute Games	Tribute Games	Jan 26, 2017	Apr 1, 2014	Feb 6, 2018		
The Messenger	Action; platform	Sabotage Studio	Devolver Digital	Mar 20, 2019	Mar 19, 2019	Mar 19, 2019		
Metal Gear Solid V: Ground Zeroes	Action-adventure; stealth	Kojima Productions	Konami	Mar 20, 2014	Mar 18, 2014	Mar 20, 2014		
Metal Gear Solid V: The Phantom Pain	Action-adventure; stealth	Kojima Productions	Konami	Sep 2, 2015	Sep 1, 2015	Sep 1, 2015	P	
Metal Gear Survive	Action-adventure; stealth	Konami	Konami	Feb 21, 2018	Feb 20, 2018	Feb 22, 2018		
Metal Max: Code Zero	Role-playing	Kadokawa Games	Kadokawa Games	TBA	Unreleased	Unreleased		
Metal Max Xeno	Role-playing	24Frame; Cattle Call; Kadokawa Games	Kadokawa Games	Apr 19, 2018	Sep 25, 2018	Sep 28, 2018	P	
Metal Max Xeno Reborn	Role-playing	24Frame; Cattle Call; Kadokawa Games	JP: Kadokawa Games; WW: PQube	Sep 10, 2020	Jun 10, 2022	Jun 10, 2022		
Metal Max: Wild West	Role-playing	24Frame; Cattle Call; Kadokawa Games	Kadokawa Games	TBA	Unreleased	Unreleased		
Metal Slug 3	Run and gun	SNK	SNK	May 14, 2015	Mar 24, 2015	Apr 29, 2015	CP	
Metal Revolution	Fighting	Next Studios	Next Studios	Unreleased	TBA	TBA		
Metal Wolf Chaos XD	Third-person shooter	FromSoftware	Devolver Digital	Aug 6, 2019	Aug 6, 2019	Aug 6, 2019		
Metallic Child	Action; roguelike	Studio HG	Crest	TBA	TBA	TBA		
Metaphor: ReFantazio	Role-playing	Studio Zero	Sega; Atlus	Oct 11, 2024	Oct 11, 2024	Oct 11, 2024		
Metamorphosis	Puzzle-platform	Ovid Works	All in! Games	Nov 4, 2020	Aug 12, 2020	Aug 12, 2020	P	
Metaverse Keeper	Dungeon crawler	Sparks Games	Sparks Games	Unreleased	TBA	TBA		
Metrico+	Platform; puzzle	Digital Dreams	Digital Dreams	Aug 24, 2016	Aug 23, 2016	Aug 23, 2016		
Metro Exodus	First-person shooter	4A Games	Deep Silver	Feb 22, 2019	Feb 22, 2019	Feb 22, 2019	CB P	
Metro 2033 Redux	First-person shooter	4A Games	Deep Silver	Oct 30, 2014	Aug 26, 2014	Aug 29, 2014		
Metro: Last Light Redux	First-person shooter	4A Games	Deep Silver	Oct 30, 2014	Aug 26, 2014	Aug 29, 2014		
The Metronomicon: Slay the Dance Floor	Music	Puuba	Akupara Games	Oct 13, 2017	Aug 29, 2017	Aug 29, 2017		
Mhakna Gramura and Fairy Bell	Visual novel	Alice in Dissonance	Phoenixx	Unreleased	TBA	TBA		
Micetopia	Role-playing	Ratalaika Games	Ratalaika Games	Nov 19, 2020	Nov 20, 2020	Nov 20, 2020		
Micro Machines World Series	Racing	Codemasters	Koch Media	Unreleased	Apr 21, 2017	Apr 21, 2017		
Middle-earth: Shadow of Mordor	Action-adventure	Monolith Productions	WB Games	Dec 25, 2014	Sep 30, 2014	Oct 3, 2014	P	
Middle-earth: Shadow of War	Action-adventure	Monolith Productions	WB Games	Oct 10, 2017	Oct 10, 2017	Oct 10, 2017	P	
Mighty Fight Federation	Fighting	Komi Games	Forthright Entertainment	Unreleased	Feb 25, 2021	Feb 25, 2021		
Mighty Goose	Run 'n gun	Blastmode; MP2 Games	Playism	Jun 5, 2021	Jun 5, 2021	Jun 5, 2021		
Mighty Morphin Power Rangers: Rita's Rewind	Side-scrolling video game	Digital Eclipse	Digital Eclipse	Unreleased	Dec 10, 2024	Dec 10, 2024		
Mighty Morphin Power Rangers: Mega Battle	Action, fighting	Bamtang Games	Bandai Namco Entertainment	Jan 17, 2017	Jan 17, 2017	Jan 17, 2017		
Mighty No. 9	Action; platform	Comcept, Inti Creates	Deep Silver	Jun 21, 2016	Jun 21, 2016	Jun 24, 2016		
Mighty Switch Force! Collection	Action; platform	WayForward	WayForward	Unreleased	Jul 30, 2019	Jul 25, 2019		
Miles & Kilo	Platform	Four Horses	Four Horses	Dec 25, 2019	Oct 29, 2019	Oct 29, 2019		
Minecraft: Bedrock Edition	Sandbox; survival	Mojang	Sony Interactive Entertainment	Dec 10, 2019	Dec 10, 2019	Dec 10, 2019	CP P VR	
Minecraft Dungeons	Dungeon crawler	Mojang	Sony Interactive Entertainment	May 28, 2020	May 28, 2020	May 28, 2020	CP P	
Minecraft: PlayStation 4 Edition	Sandbox; survival	4J Studios	Sony Interactive Entertainment	Sep 4, 2014	Sep 4, 2014	Sep 4, 2014		
Minecraft: Story Mode	Graphic adventure	Telltale Games	Telltale Games	Oct 13, 2015	Oct 13, 2015	Oct 13, 2015		
Minecraft: Story Mode - Season 2	Graphic adventure	Telltale Games	Telltale Games	Jul 11, 2017	Jul 11, 2017	Jul 11, 2017		
Mini Metro	Puzzle; strategy	Dinosaur Polo Club	Dinosaur Polo Club	Unreleased	Sep 10, 2019	Sep 10, 2019		
Mini Motor Racing X	Racing; vehicular combat	The Binary Mill	NextGen Reality	Dec 24, 2019	Dec 17, 2019	Dec 17, 2019	P VR	
Minoria	Action platform	Bombservice	Dangen Entertainment	Sep 10, 2020	Sep 10, 2020	Sep 10, 2020		
Minotaur Arcade Volume 1	Arcade	Llamasoft	Llamasoft	Unreleased	Oct 21, 2019	Oct 10, 2019		
Minutes	Action; puzzle	Red Phantom Games	Red Phantom Games	Unreleased	Feb 10, 2015	Nov 5, 2014		
Mirror's Edge Catalyst	Action-adventure, platform	EA DICE	Electronic Arts	Jun 9, 2016	Jun 7, 2016	Jun 9, 2016		
Miss Kobayashi's Dragon Maid: Sakuretsu! Chorogon Breath	Shoot 'em up	Kaminari Games	Bushiroad	Mar 24, 2022	Unreleased	Unreleased		
Mistover	Role-playing; turn-based	Krafton Game Union	Krafton Game Union	Oct 10, 2019	Oct 10, 2019	Oct 10, 2019		
Mistover: Dr. Faust's Otherworldly Adventure	Role-playing; turn-based	Krafton Game Union	Krafton Game Union	Mar 12, 2020	Unreleased	Unreleased		
MLB 14: The Show	Sports	San Diego Studio	Sony Computer Entertainment	May 6, 2014	May 6, 2014	May 6, 2014		
MLB 15: The Show	Sports	San Diego Studio	Sony Computer Entertainment	Apr 9, 2015	Mar 31, 2015	Apr 1, 2015		
MLB The Show 16	Sports	San Diego Studio	Sony Computer Entertainment	Mar 30, 2016	Mar 29, 2016	Mar 29, 2016		
MLB The Show 17	Sports	San Diego Studio	Sony Interactive Entertainment	Mar 28, 2017	Mar 28, 2017	Mar 28, 2017	P	
MLB The Show 18	Sports	San Diego Studio	Sony Interactive Entertainment	Mar 27, 2018	Mar 27, 2018	Mar 27, 2018	P	
MLB The Show 19	Sports	San Diego Studio	Sony Interactive Entertainment	Mar 26, 2019	Mar 26, 2019	Mar 26, 2019	P	
MLB The Show 20	Sports	San Diego Studio	Sony Interactive Entertainment	Mar 17, 2020	Mar 17, 2020	Mar 17, 2020	P	
MLB The Show 21	Sports	San Diego Studio	Sony Interactive Entertainment	Apr 20, 2021	Apr 20, 2021	Apr 20, 2021		
MLB The Show 22	Sports	San Diego Studio	Sony Interactive Entertainment	Apr 5, 2022	Apr 5, 2022	Apr 5, 2022		
MLB The Show 23	Sports	San Diego Studio	Sony Interactive Entertainment	Mar 28, 2023	Mar 28, 2023	Mar 28, 2023		
MLB The Show 24	Sports	San Diego Studio	Sony Interactive Entertainment	Mar 19, 2024	Mar 19, 2024	Mar 19, 2024		
Mobile Suit Gundam Extreme Vs. Maxiboost ON	Action	Bandai Namco Entertainment	Bandai Namco Entertainment	Jul 30, 2020	Jul 30, 2020	Jul 30, 2020		
Modern Tales: Age of Invention	Puzzle; hidden object	Orchid Games	Artifex Mundi	Unreleased	Apr 2, 2019	Apr 2, 2019		
Momodora: Reverie Under the Moonlight	Metroidvania	Bombservice	Playism	Mar 16, 2017	Mar 16, 2017	Mar 16, 2017		
Monark	Role-playing	Lancarse	JP: FuRyu; WW: NIS America	Oct 14, 2021	Feb 22, 2022	Feb 25, 2022		
Monkey King: Hero is Back	Action	Hexa Drive	Oasis Games	Oct 17, 2019	Oct 17, 2019	Oct 17, 2019		
Monopoly	Board game, party	Engine Software	Ubisoft	Unreleased	Sep 26, 2024	Sep 26, 2024		
Monopoly Deal	Board game, party	Asobo Studios	Ubisoft	Unreleased	Nov 18, 2014	Nov 18, 2014		
Monopoly Madness	Board game, party	Engine Software	Ubisoft	Dec 9, 2021	Dec 9, 2021	Dec 9, 2021		
Monopoly Plus	Board game, party	Asobo Studios	Ubisoft	Unreleased	Nov 26, 2014	Nov 26, 2014		
Monster Boy and the Cursed Kingdom	Platform	The Game Atelier	FDG Entertainment	Aug 6, 2020	Dec 4, 2018	Dec 4, 2018	CB	
Monster Energy Supercross	Racing	Milestone srl	NA: Square Enix; EU: Milestone srl	Feb 13, 2018	Feb 13, 2018	Feb 13, 2018		
Monster Energy Supercross 2	Racing	Milestone srl	Milestone srl	Unreleased	Feb 5, 2019	Feb 8, 2019		
Monster Energy Supercross 3	Racing	Milestone srl	Milestone srl	Unreleased	Feb 4, 2020	Feb 4, 2020		
Monster Energy Supercross 4	Racing	Milestone srl	Milestone srl	Unreleased	Mar 11, 2021	Mar 11, 2021		
Monster Harvest	Action role-playing; farming	Maple Powered Games	Merge Games	Jan 27, 2022	Jan 27, 2022	Jan 27, 2022		
Monster Hunter: World	Action role-playing	Capcom	Capcom	Jan 26, 2018	Jan 26, 2018	Jan 26, 2018	P	
Monster Hunter Rise	Action role-playing	Capcom	Capcom	Jan 20, 2023	Jan 20, 2023	Jan 20, 2023	P	
Monster Jam Steel Titans	Racing	Rainbow Studios	THQ Nordic	Oct 21, 2019	Jun 25, 2019	Jun 25, 2019		
Monster Jam Steel Titans 2	Racing	Rainbow Studios	THQ Nordic	Mar 2, 2021	Mar 2, 2021	Mar 2, 2021		
Monster Sanctuary	Role-playing; Metroidvania	Moi Rai Games	Team17	Dec 7, 2020	Dec 8, 2020	Dec 8, 2020		
Monster Truck Championship	Racing; simulation	Teyon	Nacon	Unreleased	Oct 20, 2020	Oct 15, 2020	P	
Moon Hunters	Role-playing	Kitfox Games	Kitfox Games	Feb 9, 2017	Jul 19, 2016	Jul 12, 2016		
Moons of Madness	Horror	Rock Pocket Games	Funcom	Mar 24, 2020	Mar 24, 2020	Mar 24, 2020		
Moonlighter	Action role-playing	Digital Sun Games	JP: Teyon; WW: Digital Sun Games	Nov 22, 2019	May 29, 2018	May 29, 2018		
The Mooseman	Adventure	Morteshka	Sometimes You	Unreleased	Jul 18, 2018	Jul 18, 2018		
Morbid: The Seven Acolytes	Action role-playing; souls-like	Still Running	Merge Games	Dec 2, 2020	Dec 3, 2020	Dec 3, 2020		
Mordheim: City of the Damned	Tactical role-playing	Rogue Factor	Focus Home Interactive	Oct 18, 2016	Oct 18, 2016	Oct 18, 2016		
More Dark	Puzzle-platform	HugePixel	Ratalaika Games	Unreleased	Nov 24, 2020	Nov 25, 2020		
Mortal Kombat X	Fighting	NetherRealm Studios	WB Games	Apr 14, 2015	Apr 14, 2015	Apr 14, 2015		
Mortal Kombat 11	Fighting	NetherRealm Studios	WB Games	Unreleased	Apr 23, 2019	Apr 23, 2019	CB CP P	
Mortal Kombat: Legacy Kollection	Fighting	Digital Eclipse	Digital Eclipse; Atari	Oct 30, 2025	Oct 30, 2025	Oct 30, 2025		
Mortal Shell	Action role-playing	Cold Symmetry	Playstack	Aug 18, 2020	Aug 18, 2020	Aug 18, 2020	P	
Mosaic	Adventure	Krillbite Studio	Raw Fury	Feb 19, 2020	Feb 11, 2020	Feb 11, 2020	P	
Mother Russia Bleeds	Beat 'em up	Le Cartel Studio	Devolver Digital	Dec 3, 2016	Dec 3, 2016	Dec 3, 2016	P	
Mothergunship	First-person shooter	Terrible Posture Games	Grip Digital	Unreleased	Jul 17, 2018	Jul 17, 2018		
MotoGP 14	Racing	Milestone srl	Milestone srl	Unreleased	Nov 4, 2014	Jun 20, 2014		
MotoGP 15	Racing	Milestone srl	Milestone srl	Oct 1, 2015	Jun 24, 2015	Jun 24, 2015		
MotoGP 17	Racing	Milestone srl	Milestone srl	Jun 15, 2017	Jun 15, 2017	Jun 15, 2017	P	
MotoGP 18	Racing	Milestone srl	Milestone srl	Jun 7, 2018	Jun 7, 2018	Jun 7, 2018	P	
MotoGP 19	Racing	Milestone srl	Milestone srl	Jun 6, 2019	Jun 6, 2019	Jun 6, 2019	P	
MotoGP 20	Racing	Milestone srl	Milestone srl	Aug 27, 2020	Apr 23, 2020	Apr 23, 2020	P	
MotoGP 21	Racing	Milestone srl	Milestone srl	May 13, 2021	Apr 22, 2021	Apr 21, 2021		
MotoGP 22	Racing	Milestone srl	Milestone srl	Apr 21, 2022	Apr 21, 2022	Apr 21, 2022		
Moto Racer 4	Racing	Artefacts Studio	Microids	Nov 4, 2016	Nov 4, 2016	Nov 4, 2016	P VR	
Motor Strike: Immortal Legends	Vehicular combat	FiveXGames	FiveXGames	Unreleased	Dec 16, 2016	Dec 15, 2016	CP	
Mount & Blade: Warband	Action role-playing	TaleWorlds Entertainment	Koch Media	Sep 16, 2016	Sep 16, 2016	Sep 16, 2016	P	
Mount & Blade II: Bannerlord	Action role-playing	TaleWorlds Entertainment	Koch Media	Oct 25, 2022	Oct 25, 2022	Oct 25, 2022		
MouseCraft	Puzzle	Crunching Koalas	Crunching Koalas	Feb 3, 2016	Jul 8, 2014	Jul 9, 2014		
Move or Die	Party	Those Awesome Guys	Those Awesome Guys	Unreleased	Mar 5, 2019	Mar 5, 2019		
Moving Out	Action; puzzle	DevM Games; SMG Studio	Team17	Apr 30, 2020	Apr 28, 2020	Apr 28, 2020		
Moving Out 2	Action; puzzle	DevM Games; SMG Studio	Team17	Aug 15, 2023	Aug 15, 2023	Aug 15, 2023		
Mowin & Throwin	Action; party	House Pixel Games	House Pixel Games	Unreleased	Sep 16, 2019	Unreleased		
Mozart Requiem	Adventure	GS2 Games	GS2 Games	Unreleased	Jan 26, 2021	Unreleased		
Mr. Driller Drill Land	Puzzle	Infinity Co.	Bandai Namco	Nov 4, 2021	Nov 4, 2021	Nov 4, 2021		
Mr. Pumpkin Adventure 2: Kowloon Walled City	Platform	Cotton Game	Cotton Game	TBA	TBA	TBA		
Mugsters	Action; puzzle	Reinkout Games	Team17	Nov 1, 2018	Jul 17, 2018	Jul 17, 2018		
Mulaka	Action-adventure	Lienzo	Lienzo	Nov 29, 2018	Feb 27, 2018	Feb 27, 2018		
The Mummy Demastered	Metroidvania	WayForward Technologies	WayForward Technologies	Jul 30, 2020	Oct 24, 2017	Oct 24, 2017		
Munchkin: Quacked Quest	Board game	Steve Jackson Games	Asmodee	Unreleased	Nov 19, 2019	Nov 19, 2019		
Murder Detective: Jack the Ripper	Adventure	Nippon Ichi Software	Nippon Ichi Software	Apr 25, 2019	Unreleased	Unreleased		
Murdered: Soul Suspect	Action-adventure	Airtight Games	Square Enix	Jul 17, 2014	Jun 3, 2014	Jun 6, 2014		
Mushroom Heroes	Puzzle-platform	Serkhan Bakar	Hidden Trap	Jul 30, 2020	Jul 21, 2020	Jul 22, 2020		
Mushroom Wars 2	Real-time strategy	Zillion Whales	Zillion Whales	TBA	TBA	TBA		
Musicus!	Visual novel	Overdrive	Entergram	Mar 24, 2022	Mar 24, 2022	Mar 24, 2022		
Mutant Football League	Action; sports	Digital Dreams Entertainment	Digital Dreams Entertainment	Unreleased	Jan 19, 2018	Feb 23, 2018		
Mutant Mudds Deluxe	Platform	Renegade Kid	Renegade Kid	Unreleased	Nov 15, 2016	Nov 30, 2016		
Mutant Mudds Super Challenge	Platform	Renegade Kid	Renegade Kid	Unreleased	Jul 26, 2016	Aug 3, 2016		
Mutant Year Zero: Road to Eden	Adventure	The Bearded Ladies	Funcom	Feb 28, 2019	Dec 4, 2018	Dec 4, 2018		
Mutazione	Adventure	Die Gute Fabrik	Akupara Games	Unreleased	Sep 19, 2019	Sep 19, 2019		
MXGP The Official Motocross Videogame	Racing	Milestone srl	Milestone srl	Nov 18, 2014	Nov 18, 2014	Nov 18, 2014		
MXGP 2	Racing	Milestone srl	Milestone srl	Jun 9, 2016	Mar 31, 2016	Mar 31, 2016		
MXGP 3	Racing	Milestone srl	Milestone srl	Jul 20, 2017	May 30, 2017	May 30, 2017		
MXGP 2019	Racing	Milestone srl	Milestone srl	Unreleased	Aug 27, 2019	Aug 27, 2019		
MXGP 2020	Racing	Milestone srl	Milestone srl	Unreleased	Dec 16, 2020	Dec 16, 2020		
MXGP 2021	Racing	Milestone srl	Milestone srl	Unreleased	Nov 30, 2021	Nov 30, 2021		
MX Nitro	Racing	Saber Interactive	Miniclip Games	Unreleased	Feb 14, 2017	Feb 14, 2017		
MX Nitro: Unleashed	Racing	Saber Interactive	Mad Dog Games	Unreleased	Feb 27, 2020	Feb 27, 2020		
MX vs ATV All Out	Racing	Rainbow Studios	THQ Nordic	Apr 8, 2021	Mar 27, 2018	Mar 27, 2018		
MX vs ATV Legends	Racing	Rainbow Studios	THQ Nordic	TBA	TBA	TBA		
MX vs. ATV Supercross Encore	Racing	Rainbow Studios	Nordic Games	Oct 27, 2015	Oct 27, 2015	Oct 27, 2015		
My Big Sister	Role-playing	Stranga	Ratalaika Games	Unreleased	May 7, 2019	May 8, 2019		
My Brother Rabbit	Puzzle; hidden object	Artifex Mundi	Artifex Mundi	Unreleased	Sep 21, 2018	Sep 21, 2018		
My Child Lebensborn	Adventure	Sarepta Studio	Sarepta Studio	TBA	TBA	TBA		
My First Gran Turismo	Racing, simulation	Polyphony Digital	Sony Interactive Entertainment	Dec 6, 2024	Dec 6, 2024	Dec 6, 2024		
My Friend Pedro	Shoot 'em up	DeadToast Entertainment	Devolver Digital	Apr 10, 2020	Apr 2, 2020	Apr 2, 2020		
My Hero: One's Justice	Fighting	Bandai Namco Entertainment	Bandai Namco Entertainment	Oct 26, 2018	Oct 26, 2018	Oct 26, 2018		
My Hero: One's Justice 2	Fighting	Bandai Namco Entertainment	Bandai Namco Entertainment	Mar 12, 2020	Mar 13, 2020	Mar 13, 2020		
My Time at Portia	Role-playing	Pathea Games	Team17	Apr 16, 2019	Apr 16, 2019	Apr 16, 2019		
My Time at Sandrock	Role-playing	Pathea Games	Pathea Games	Nov 2, 2023	Nov 2, 2023	Nov 2, 2023		
My Universe: Cooking Star Restaurant	Simulation	Old Skull Games	Microids	Unreleased	Nov 10, 2020	Nov 10, 2020		
My Universe: Fashion Boutique	Simulation	Black Sheep Studio	Microids	Unreleased	Oct 27, 2020	Oct 27, 2020		
My Universe: My Baby	Simulation	Smart Tale Games	Microids	Unreleased	Jan 21, 2021	Nov 26, 2020		
My Universe: Pet Clinic Cats & Dogs	Simulation	It Matters Games	Microids	Unreleased	Dec 3, 2020	Dec 3, 2020		
My Universe: School Teacher	Simulation	Magic Pockets	Microids	Unreleased	Nov 3, 2020	Oct 15, 2020		
Mystery Chronicle: One Way Heroics	Role-playing	Smoking Wolf	Spike Chunsoft	Jul 30, 2015	Sep 13, 2016	Sep 13, 2016		
N++	Platform	Metanet Software	Metanet Software	Jul 29, 2015	Jun 27, 2019	Jul 28, 2015		
Namco Museum Archives Vol. 1	Arcade	B.B. Studio	Bandai Namco Entertainment	Jun 18, 2020	Jun 18, 2020	Jun 18, 2020		
Namco Museum Archives Vol. 2	Arcade	B.B. Studio	Bandai Namco Entertainment	Jun 18, 2020	Jun 18, 2020	Jun 18, 2020		
Nano Assault Neo X	Shoot 'em up	Shin'en Multimedia	Shin'en Multimedia	Unreleased	Nov 11, 2014	Oct 29, 2014		
Narcos: Rise of the Cartels	Turn-based strategy	Kuju Entertainment	Curve Digital	Unreleased	Nov 19, 2019	Nov 19, 2019		
Narita Boy	Action-adventure	Studio Koba	Team17	Mar 30, 2021	Mar 30, 2021	Mar 30, 2021		
Naruto: Ultimate Ninja Storm	Fighting	CyberConnect2	Bandai Namco Entertainment	Jul 27, 2017	Aug 25, 2017	Aug 25, 2017		
Naruto Shippuden: Ultimate Ninja Storm 2	Fighting	CyberConnect2	Bandai Namco Entertainment	Jul 27, 2017	Aug 25, 2017	Aug 25, 2017		
Naruto Shippuden: Ultimate Ninja Storm 3	Fighting	CyberConnect2	Bandai Namco Entertainment	Jul 27, 2017	Aug 25, 2017	Aug 25, 2017		
Naruto Shippuden: Ultimate Ninja Storm 4	Fighting	CyberConnect2	Bandai Namco Entertainment	Feb 4, 2016	Feb 9, 2016	Feb 5, 2016		
Naruto to Boruto: Shinobi Striker	Fighting	Soleil Ltd.	Bandai Namco Entertainment	Aug 30, 2018	Aug 31, 2018	Aug 31, 2018		
NASCAR Heat Evolution	Racing	Monster Games	DM Racing	Unreleased	Sep 13, 2016	Nov 7, 2016		
NASCAR Heat 2	Racing	Monster Games	704Games	Unreleased	Sep 13, 2017	Sep 13, 2017		
NASCAR Heat 3	Racing	Monster Games	704Games	Unreleased	Sep 7, 2018	Sep 7, 2018		
NASCAR Heat 4	Racing	Monster Games	704Games	Unreleased	Sep 13, 2019	Sep 13, 2019		
NASCAR Heat 5	Racing	Monster Games	704Games	Unreleased	Jul 7, 2020	Jul 7, 2020		
NASCAR 21: Ignition	Racing	Motorsport Games	Motorsport Games	Unreleased	Oct 28, 2021	Oct 28, 2021		
Natsuiro High School: Seishun Hakusho	Action-adventure; stealth	Tamsoft	D3 Publisher	Jun 4, 2015	Unreleased	Unreleased		
Natsuki Chronicles	Shoot 'em up	Qute Corporation	Rising Star Games	Unreleased	TBA	TBA		
Natural Doctrine	Tactical role-playing	Kadokawa Games	Kadokawa Games	Apr 3, 2014	Sep 30, 2014	Oct 3, 2014	CP	
Naught	2D; platform	WildSphere	WildSphere	Unreleased	Jul 31, 2020	Jul 31, 2020		
NBA 2K14	Sports	Visual Concepts	2K Sports	Feb 22, 2014	Nov 15, 2013	Nov 29, 2013	C	
NBA 2K15	Sports	Visual Concepts	2K Sports	Nov 27, 2014	Oct 7, 2014	Oct 10, 2014	C	
NBA 2K16	Sports	Visual Concepts	2K Sports	Sep 29, 2015	Sep 29, 2015	Sep 29, 2015	C	
NBA 2K17	Sports	Visual Concepts	2K Sports	Sep 20, 2016	Sep 20, 2016	Sep 20, 2016	P	
NBA 2K18	Sports	Visual Concepts	2K Sports	Sep 19, 2017	Sep 19, 2017	Sep 19, 2017	P	
NBA 2K19	Sports	Visual Concepts	2K Sports	Sep 11, 2018	Sep 11, 2018	Sep 11, 2018	P	
NBA 2K20	Sports	Visual Concepts	2K Sports	Sep 6, 2019	Sep 6, 2019	Sep 6, 2019	P	
NBA 2K21	Sports	Visual Concepts	2K Sports	Sep 4, 2020	Sep 4, 2020	Sep 4, 2020	P	
NBA 2K22	Sports	Visual Concepts	2K Sports	Sep 10, 2021	Sep 10, 2021	Sep 10, 2021		
NBA 2K23	Sports	Visual Concepts	2K Sports	Sep 9, 2022	Sep 9, 2022	Sep 9, 2022		
NBA 2K24	Sports	Visual Concepts	2K Sports	Sep 8, 2023	Sep 8, 2023	Sep 8, 2023		
NBA 2K25	Sports	Visual Concepts	2K Sports	Sep 6, 2024	Sep 6, 2024	Sep 6, 2024		
NBA 2K26	Sports	Visual Concepts	2K Sports	Sep 5, 2025	Sep 5, 2025	Sep 5, 2025		
NBA 2K Playgrounds 2	Sports	Saber Interactive	Saber Interactive	Oct 16, 2018	Oct 16, 2018	Oct 16, 2018		
NBA Live 14	Sports	EA Tiburon	Electronic Arts	Nov 22, 2013	Nov 22, 2013	Nov 22, 2013		
NBA Live 15	Sports	EA Tiburon	Electronic Arts	Oct 31, 2014	Oct 28, 2014	Oct 31, 2014		
NBA Live 16	Sports	EA Tiburon	Electronic Arts	Aug 29, 2016	Sep 29, 2015	Oct 1, 2015		
NBA Live 18	Sports	EA Tiburon	Electronic Arts	Oct 3, 2017	Sep 15, 2017	Sep 15, 2017		
NBA Live 19	Sports	EA Tiburon	Electronic Arts	Sep 7, 2018	Sep 7, 2018	Sep 7, 2018	P	
NBA Playgrounds	Sports	Saber Interactive	Saber Interactive	Unreleased	May 9, 2017	May 9, 2017		
Necrobarista	Visual novel	Route 59	Coconut Island Games	TBA	TBA	TBA		
Necromunda: Hired Gun	First-person shooter	Streum On Studio	Focus Home Interactive	Unreleased	Jun 1, 2021	Jun 1, 2021		
Necromunda: Underhive Wars	Turn-based strategy	Games Workshop	Focus Home Interactive	Sep 17, 2020	Sep 7, 2020	Sep 8, 2020		
Necropolis	Action role-playing	Harebrained Schemes	Bandai Namco Entertainment	Sep 6, 2016	Sep 6, 2016	Sep 6, 2016		
Need for Speed	Racing	Ghost Games	Electronic Arts	Nov 3, 2015	Nov 3, 2015	Nov 3, 2015		
Need for Speed: Heat	Racing	Ghost Games	Electronic Arts	Nov 8, 2019	Nov 8, 2019	Nov 8, 2019	CP	
Need for Speed: Hot Pursuit Remastered	Racing	Criterion Games	Electronic Arts	Nov 6, 2020	Nov 6, 2020	Nov 6, 2020	CP P	
Need for Speed: Payback	Racing	Ghost Games	Electronic Arts	Nov 10, 2017	Nov 10, 2017	Nov 10, 2017	P	
Need for Speed: Rivals	Racing	Ghost Games	Electronic Arts	Feb 22, 2014	Nov 15, 2013	Nov 29, 2013		
Nefarious	Action-platformer	Stage Clear Studios; Starblade	Digerati	Unreleased	Sep 11, 2018	Sep 11, 2018		
Neighbours back From Hell	Puzzle; strategy	Farbworks; THQ Nordic	HandyGames	Unreleased	Oct 8, 2020	Oct 8, 2020	P	
Nekopara Vol. 1	Visual novel	Neko Works	CFK	Jul 4, 2018	Jul 4, 2018	Aug 23, 2018		
Nekopara Vol. 2	Visual novel	Neko Works	CFK	Feb 14, 2019	Feb 14, 2019	Feb 14, 2019		
Nekopara Vol. 3	Visual novel	Neko Works	CFK	Jun 27, 2019	Jun 27, 2019	Jun 27, 2019		
Nekopara Vol. 4	Visual novel	Neko Works	CFK	Dec 22, 2020	Dec 22, 2020	Dec 22, 2020		
Nelke & the Legendary Alchemists: Ateliers of the New World	Town-building	Gust Co. Ltd.	Koei Tecmo	Jan 31, 2019	Apr 25, 2019	May 15, 2019		
Neon Abyss	Action; roguelite; shooter	Veewo Games	Team17	Jul 14, 2020	Jul 14, 2020	Jul 14, 2020		
Neon Chrome	Shooter	10tons	10tons	Unreleased	May 31, 2016	May 31, 2016	P	
Neon City Riders	Action-adventure	Mecha Studios	Bromio	Unreleased	Mar 12, 2020	Unreleased		
Neon White	Movement shooter	Angel Matrix	Annapurna Interactive	Dec 13, 2022	Dec 13, 2022	Dec 13, 2022		
Neopolis	Real-time strategy	Omni Systems	Omni Systems	TBA	TBA	TBA		
Neo: The World Ends with You	Action role-playing	Square Enix	Square Enix	Jul 27, 2021	Jul 27, 2021	Jul 27, 2021		
Neptunia Game Maker R:Evolution	Role-playing	Compile Heart	Idea Factory	Aug 10, 2023	May 14, 2024	May 14, 2024		
Neptunia Riders VS Dogoos	Racing	Compile Heart	Idea Factory	June 27, 2024	Jan 28, 2025	Jan 28, 2025		
Neptunia: Sisters vs Sisters	Role-playing	Compile Heart	Idea Factory	Apr 21, 2022	Jan 24, 2023	Jan 24, 2023		
Neptunia x Senran Kagura: Ninja Wars	Action role-playing	Tamsoft	JP: Compile Heart; WW: Idea Factory International	Sep 16, 2021	Oct 26, 2021	Oct 29, 2021		
Nerf Legends	First-person shooter	Fun Labs	GameMill Entertainment	Unreleased	Nov 19, 2021	Nov 19, 2021		
Nero	Adventure, puzzle	Storm in a Teacup	Storm in a Teacup	Unreleased	Jun 24, 2016	Jun 24, 2016		
NeuroVoider	Shooter	Flying Oak Games	Plug In Digital	Unreleased	Mar 14, 2017	Mar 15, 2017		
Never Alone	Platform	Upper One Games	Upper One Games	Nov 20, 2014	Nov 18, 2014	Nov 18, 2014		
Neverending Nightmares	Survival horror	Infinitap Games	Infinitap Games	Sep 26, 2014	Sep 26, 2014	Sep 26, 2014		
Neversong	Adventure	Atmos Games; Serenity Forge	Serenity Forge	Oct 21, 2020	Oct 31, 2019	Jul 16, 2020		
Neverwinter Nights: Enhanced Edition	Role-playing	Beamdog	Skybound Games	Unreleased	Dec 3, 2019	Dec 6, 2019		
New Gundam Breaker	Mech-combat	Bandai Namco Entertainment	Bandai Namco Entertainment	Jun 21, 2018	Jun 22, 2018	Jun 22, 2018		
New Star Manager	Simulation	New Star Games	Insight Studios	Unreleased	Jul 30, 2019	Jul 9, 2019		
New Super Lucky's Tale	Platform	Playful Studios	Playful Studios	Sep 28, 2020	Aug 21, 2020	Aug 21, 2020		
Nex Machina	Multi-directional shooter	Housemarque	Housemarque	Jun 20, 2017	Jun 20, 2017	Jun 20, 2017	P	
Next Up Hero	Action	Digital Continue	Aspyr	Unreleased	Jun 28, 2018	Jun 28, 2018		
Nexomon: Extinction	Adventure	Vewo Interactive	PQube	Dec 9, 2020	Aug 28, 2020	Aug 28, 2020		
NHL '94 Rewind	Sports	Electronic Arts	Electronic Arts	Dec 3, 2020	Oct 30, 2020	Oct 30, 2020		
NHL 15	Sports	EA Canada	Electronic Arts	Unreleased	Sep 9, 2014	Sep 12, 2014		
NHL 16	Sports	EA Canada	Electronic Arts	Unreleased	Sep 15, 2015	Sep 17, 2015		
NHL 17	Sports	EA Canada	Electronic Arts	Dec 5, 2016	Sep 13, 2016	Sep 15, 2016		
NHL 18	Sports	EA Canada	Electronic Arts	Sep 15, 2017	Sep 15, 2017	Sep 15, 2017	P	
NHL 19	Sports	EA Canada	Electronic Arts	Sep 14, 2018	Sep 14, 2018	Sep 14, 2018	P	
NHL 20	Sports	EA Canada	Electronic Arts	Sep 13, 2019	Sep 13, 2019	Sep 13, 2019	P	
NHL 21	Sports	EA Canada	Electronic Arts	Oct 16, 2020	Oct 16, 2020	Oct 16, 2020	P	
NHL 22	Sports	EA Canada	Electronic Arts	Oct 15, 2021	Oct 15, 2021	Oct 15, 2021		
NHL 23	Sports	EA Canada	Electronic Arts	Oct 14, 2022	Oct 14, 2022	Oct 14, 2022		
NHL 24	Sports	EA Canada	Electronic Arts	Oct 6, 2023	Oct 6, 2023	Oct 6, 2023		
Nickelodeon All-Star Brawl	Fighting	Fair Play Labs; Ludosity	GameMill Entertainment	Nov 24, 2022	Oct 5, 2021	Oct 5, 2021		
Nickelodeon All-Star Brawl 2	Fighting	Fair Play Labs	GameMill Entertainment	Unreleased	Nov 7, 2023	Nov 7, 2023		
Nickelodeon Kart Racers	Kart racing	Bamtang Games	GameMill Entertainment	Unreleased	Oct 23, 2018	Oct 23, 2018		
Nickelodeon Kart Racers 2: Grand Prix	Kart racing	Bamtang Games	GameMill Entertainment	Oct 30, 2020	Oct 6, 2020	Oct 6, 2020	P	
Nickelodeon Kart Racers 3: Slime Speedway	Kart racing	Bamtang Games	GameMill Entertainment	Unreleased	Oct 14, 2022	Oct 14, 2022		
Nick Jr. Party Adventure	Action-adventure; Puzzle	Melbot Studious	Outright Games	Unreleased	Oct 10, 2024	Oct 10, 2024		
Nicole	Role-playing; simulation	WinterWolves Games	Ratalaika Games	Unreleased	Jul 28, 2020	Jul 29, 2020		
Nidhogg	Fighting	Messhof	Messhof	Feb 9, 2017	Oct 14, 2014	Oct 14, 2014	CP	
Nidhogg 2	Fighting	Messhof	Messhof	Oct 6, 2017	Aug 15, 2017	Aug 15, 2017	P	
Nier: Automata	Action role-playing; hack and slash	PlatinumGames	Square Enix	Feb 23, 2017	Mar 7, 2017	Mar 7, 2017	P	
Nier Replicant ver.1.22474487139...	Action role-playing; hack and slash	Toylogic	Square Enix	Apr 22, 2021	Apr 23, 2021	Apr 23, 2021		
Night in the Woods	Adventure	Finji Games	Finji Games	Mar 28, 2019	Jan 10, 2017	Jan 10, 2017		
Nightmare Boy	Metroidvania	The Vanir Project	Badland Games	Oct 24, 2017	Oct 24, 2017	Oct 24, 2017		
Nightmares from the Deep: The Cursed Heart	Puzzle; hidden object	Artifex Mundi	Artifex Mundi	Unreleased	Aug 2, 2016	Aug 2, 2016		
Nightmares from the Deep 2: The Siren's Call	Puzzle; hidden object	Artifex Mundi	Artifex Mundi	Unreleased	Mar 28, 2017	Mar 28, 2017		
Nightmares from the Deep 3: Davy Jones	Puzzle; hidden object	Artifex Mundi	Artifex Mundi	Unreleased	Feb 2, 2018	Feb 2, 2018		
Nights of Azure	Role-playing	Gust Co. Ltd.	Tecmo Koei	Oct 1, 2015	Mar 29, 2016	Apr 1, 2016		
Nights of Azure 2: Bride of the New Moon	Role-playing	Gust	Tecmo Koei	Aug 31, 2017	Oct 24, 2017	Oct 27, 2017	P	
Night Trap: 25th Anniversary Edition	Interactive movie	Screaming Villains	Screaming Villains	Unreleased	Aug 15, 2017	Aug 11, 2017		
Nine Parchments	Action	Frozenbyte	Frozenbyte	Dec 5, 2017	Dec 5, 2017	Dec 5, 2017		
Nine Witches: Family Disruption	Point-and-click adventure	Indiesruption	Blowfish Studios	Unreleased	Dec 4, 2020	Dec 4, 2020		
Ni no Kuni: Wrath of the White Witch	Role-playing	Level-5	Bandai Namco Entertainment	Sep 20, 2019	Sep 20, 2019	Sep 20, 2019	P	
Ni no Kuni II: Revenant Kingdom	Role-playing	Level-5	Bandai Namco	Mar 23, 2018	Mar 23, 2018	Mar 23, 2018	P	
Ninja Five-O	Action platformer	Konami	Limited Run Games	Unreleased	Feb 25, 2025	Feb 25, 2025		
Ninja Gaiden: Master Collection	Action-adventure; hack and slash	Team Ninja	Koei Tecmo	Jun 10, 2021	Jun 10, 2021	Jun 10, 2021		
The Ninja Saviors: Return of the Warriors	Beat 'em up	Taito	JP: M2; WW: Inin Games	Jul 25, 2019	Aug 30, 2019	Aug 30, 2019		
Ninja JaJaMaru Collection	Assorted	Biccamera	City Connection	May 20, 2021	Unreleased	Unreleased		
Ninja Shodown	Action	Rising Star Games	Rising Star Games	Sep 26, 2017	Sep 26, 2017	Sep 26, 2017		
Ninja Village	Simulation; strategy	Kairosoft	Kairosoft	Oct 29, 2020	Nov 12, 2020	Oct 30, 2020		
Nioh	Action role-playing	Koei Tecmo	Sony Interactive Entertainment	Feb 9, 2017	Feb 7, 2017	Feb 8, 2017	P	
Nioh 2	Action role-playing	Team Ninja	Koei Tecmo	Mar 13, 2020	Mar 13, 2020	Mar 13, 2020	CB P	
Nitroplus Blasterz: Heroines Infinite Duel	Fighting	Examu	Xseed Games	Dec 10, 2015	Feb 2, 2016	Apr 7, 2016	CP	
Nobody Saves the World	Action role-playing	Drinkbox Studios	Drinkbox Studios	Apr 14, 2022	Apr 14, 2022	Apr 14, 2022		
Nobunaga's Ambition: Sphere of Influence	Tactical role-playing	Koei Tecmo	Koei Tecmo	Feb 22, 2014	Sep 1, 2015	Sep 4, 2015		
Nobunaga's Ambition: Rebirth	Tactical role-playing	Koei Tecmo	Koei Tecmo	Jul 21, 2022	Jul 21, 2022	Jul 21, 2022		
Nobunaga's Ambition: Taishi	Tactical role-playing	Koei Tecmo	Koei Tecmo	Nov 30, 2017	Jul 3, 2018	Jul 6, 2018		
Noel The Mortal Fate	Adventure	Kawano	Playism	TBA	Unreleased	Unreleased		
No Heroes Here	Tower defense	Mad Mimic	Mad Mimic	May 31, 2018	May 29, 2019	Unreleased		
Noir Chronicles: City of Crime	Puzzle; hidden object	Brave Giant	Artifex Mundi	Unreleased	Nov 9, 2018	Nov 9, 2018		
No Man's Sky	Action-adventure	Hello Games	Hello Games	Aug 25, 2016	Aug 9, 2016	Aug 10, 2016	CB CP; P VR	
No More Heroes III	Action-adventure	Grasshopper Manufacture	Marvelous	Oct 6, 2022	Oct 11, 2022	Oct 14, 2022		
Nom Nom Galaxy	Platform	Q-Games	Double Eleven	Jul 1, 2015	May 12, 2015	May 14, 2015		
Northgard	Real-time strategy	Shiro Games	Shiro Games	Nov 25, 2020	Sep 26, 2019	Sep 26, 2019		
No Sleep for Kaname Date – From AI: The Somnium Files	Adventure; Visual novel; Escape room	Spike Chunsoft	Spike Chunsoft	Feb 26, 2026	Feb 26, 2026	Feb 26, 2026		
No Straight Roads	Action-adventure; rhythm	Metronomik	Sold Out	Aug 27, 2020	Aug 25, 2020	Aug 25, 2020		
Nostos	Adventure	NetEase	NetEase	Unreleased	Dec 4, 2020	Dec 4, 2020		
Not a Hero	Shooter	Roll7	Devolver Digital	Feb 2, 2016	Feb 2, 2016	Feb 2, 2016		
No Time to Explain	Platform	tinyBuild	tinyBuild	Mar 29, 2016	Mar 29, 2016	Mar 29, 2016		
Nour: Play with Your Food	Simulation; Casual	Terrifying Jellyfish	Panic Inc.	Sep 12, 2023	Sep 12, 2023	Sep 12, 2023		
Nova-111	Puzzle, turn-based	Funktronic Labs	Curve Digital	Aug 25, 2015	Aug 25, 2015	Aug 25, 2015		
Nowhere Prophet	Roguelike deck-building	Sharkbomb Studios	No More Robots	Unreleased	Jul 30, 2020	Jul 30, 2020		
Nuclear Throne	Action, roguelike	Vlambeer	Vlambeer	Dec 5, 2015	Dec 5, 2015	Dec 5, 2015		
Null Drifter	Shoot 'em up	Panda Indie Studio	EastAsiaSoft	Apr 8, 2020	Apr 7, 2020	Apr 8, 2020		
Numantia	Turn-based strategy	Reco Technology	Reco Technology	Oct 25, 2017	Oct 25, 2017	Oct 25, 2017		
Obduction	Adventure, puzzle	Cyan Worlds	Cyan Worlds	Aug 29, 2017	Jun 28, 2018	Aug 29, 2017	P VR	
Obliteracers	Vehicular combat	Space Dust Studios	Space Dust Studios	Unreleased	Jul 20, 2016	Jul 20, 2016		
Observation	Adventure; horror; puzzle	No Code	Devolver Digital	Sep 5, 2019	May 21, 2019	May 21, 2019		
Observer	Horror	Bloober Team	Aspyr	Aug 16, 2017	Aug 15, 2017	Aug 15, 2017		
Occultic;Nine	Visual novel	5pb.	Mages	Nov 9, 2017	Unreleased	Unreleased		
Oceanhorn: Monster of Uncharted Seas	Adventure	Cornfox & Bros.; Engine Software	FDG Entertainment	Unreleased	Sep 7, 2016	Sep 7, 2016		
Octodad: Dadliest Catch	Simulation, strategy	Young Horses	Young Horses	Aug 28, 2015	Apr 22, 2014	Apr 23, 2014	M	
Octopath Traveler II	Role-playing	Square Enix; Acquire	Square Enix	Feb 24, 2023	Feb 24, 2023	Feb 24, 2023		
Odallus: The Dark Call	Action; platform	Joymasher	Digerati	Mar 27, 2020	Mar 24, 2020	Mar 25, 2020		
Oddworld: New 'n' Tasty!	Action; platform	Just Add Water	Oddworld Inhabitants	Mar 4, 2015	Jul 22, 2014	Jul 23, 2014		
Odin Sphere: Leifthrasir	Action role-playing	Vanillaware	Atlus	Jan 14, 2016	Jun 7, 2016	Jun 24, 2016		
The Office Quest	Point & click adventure	11 Sheep	11 Sheep	Unreleased	Aug 12, 2020	Jun 3, 2020		
Oh! Edo Towns	Simulation	Kairosoft	Kairosoft	Nov 11, 2020	Nov 12, 2020	Nov 12, 2020		
Oh My Godheads	Fighting	Titutitech	Square Enix	Unreleased	Dec 5, 2017	Dec 5, 2017		
Oita Beppu Mystery Guide: The Warped Bamboo Lantern	Visual novel	Happymeal	Flyhigh Works	Jul 7, 2022	Unreleased	Unreleased		
OK K.O.! Let's Play Heroes	Action	Capybara Games	Cartoon Network	Unreleased	Jan 23, 2018	Jan 23, 2018		
Ōkami HD	Action-adventure	Capcom	Capcom	Dec 12, 2017	Dec 12, 2017	Dec 12, 2017	P	
OkunoKA Madness	Platform	Caracal Games	Ignition	Unreleased	Sep 8, 2020	Sep 8, 2020		
Old Man's Journey	Adventure; puzzle	Broken Rules	Broken Rules	Jun 6, 2018	May 29, 2018	May 29, 2018		
OlliOlli	Sports; side-scroller	Roll7	Roll7	Sep 24, 2014	Aug 26, 2014	Aug 27, 2014		
OlliOlli2: Welcome to Olliwood	Sports; side-scroller	Roll7	Roll7	Apr 1, 2015	Mar 3, 2015	Mar 4, 2015		
Olija	Action-adventure	Skeleton Crew Studio	Devolver Digital	Jan 28, 2021	Jan 28, 2021	Jan 28, 2021		
Olympic Games Tokyo 2020 - The Official Video Game	Sports	Sega	Sega	Jul 24, 2019	Jun 22, 2021	Jun 22, 2021		
Omega Quintet	Role-playing	Compile Heart	Compile Heart	Oct 2, 2014	Apr 28, 2015	May 1, 2015	C M	
Omensight	Action role-playing	Spearhead Games	Spearhead Games	Unreleased	May 18, 2019	May 15, 2019		
OMORI	Role-playing	OMOCAT	Playism	TBA	TBA	TBA		
One Finger Death Punch 2	Brawler	Silver Dollar Games	EastAsiaSoft	Sep 30, 2020	Sep 30, 2020	Sep 30, 2020		
Onechanbara Origin	Action; hack and slash	Tamsoft	D3 Publisher	Dec 5, 2019	Oct 14, 2020	Oct 14, 2020		
Onechanbara Z2: Chaos	Action; hack and slash	Tamsoft	D3 Publisher	Oct 30, 2014	Jul 21, 2015	Aug 28, 2015		
One More Dungeon	Role-playing	Ratalaika Games	Ratalaika Games	Dec 21, 2017	Dec 12, 2017	Dec 13, 2017		
One Night Stand	Visual novel	Kinmoku	Ratalaika Games	Unreleased	Oct 1, 2019	Oct 2, 2019		
One Piece: Burning Blood	Fighting	Spike Chunsoft	Bandai Namco Entertainment	Apr 16, 2016	May 31, 2016	Jun 3, 2016		
One Piece Odyssey	Role-playing	ILCA	Bandai Namco Entertainment	Jan 12, 2023	Jan 13, 2023	Jan 13, 2023		
One Piece: Pirate Warriors 3	Action	Koei Tecmo	Bandai Namco Entertainment	Mar 26, 2015	Aug 25, 2015	Aug 28, 2015		
One Piece: Pirate Warriors 4	Platform	Omega Force; Koei Tecmo	Bandai Namco Entertainment	Mar 26, 2020	Mar 27, 2020	Mar 27, 2020		
One Piece: Unlimited World Red Deluxe Edition	Action-adventure	Tecmo Koei	Bandai Namco Entertainment	Aug 24, 2017	Aug 25, 2017	Aug 25, 2017		
One Piece: World Seeker	Action-adventure	Ganbarion	Bandai Namco Entertainment	Mar 14, 2019	Mar 15, 2019	Mar 15, 2019		
One-Punch Man: A Hero Nobody Knows	Fighting	Spike Chunsoft	Bandai Namco	Feb 27, 2020	Feb 28, 2020	Feb 28, 2020		
One Step From Eden	Strategy; roguelike	Thomas Moon Kang	Humble Bundle	Jun 26, 2020	Jun 6, 2020	Jun 6, 2020		
One Upon Light	Puzzle	SUTD Game Lab	Rising Star Games	Feb 24, 2015	Oct 13, 2015	Oct 13, 2015		
Oniken	Action; platform	Joymasher	Digerati	Mar 27, 2020	Mar 24, 2020	Mar 25, 2020		
Onimusha: Warlords	Action-adventure	Capcom	Capcom	Dec 20, 2018	Jan 15, 2019	Jan 15, 2019		
Oninaki	Action role-playing	Tokyo RPG Factory	Square Enix	Aug 22, 2019	Aug 22, 2019	Aug 22, 2019		
Onirike	Platform	Devilish Games	Badland Publishing	Unreleased	TBA	TBA		
Onrush	Racing	Codemasters	Codemasters	Unreleased	Jun 5, 2018	Jun 5, 2018	P	
Open Roads	Mystery-thriller	Fullbright	Annapurna Interactive	TBA	TBA	TBA		
Operencia: The Stolen Sun	Role-playing	Zen Studios	Zen Studios	Unreleased	Mar 31, 2020	Mar 31, 2020	VR	
Orangeblood	Role-playing	Grayfax Software	Playism	Oct 1, 2020	Oct 1, 2020	Oct 1, 2020		
Ord.	Adventure	Mujo Games	Ratalaika Games	Nov 5, 2020	Nov 3, 2020	Nov 4, 2020		
The Order: 1886	Third-person shooter	Ready at Dawn; Santa Monica Studio	Sony Computer Entertainment	Feb 20, 2015	Feb 20, 2015	Feb 20, 2015		
Order of Battle: World War II	Computer wargame	The Artistocrats	Slitherine Software	Unreleased	Aug 19, 2021	Aug 19, 2021		
The Oregon Trail	Casual; Adventure	Gameloft	Maximum Games	Feb 9, 2024	Feb 9, 2024	Feb 9, 2024		
Organ Trail	Simulation, survival	The Men Who Wear Many Hats	The Men Who Wear Many Hats	Unreleased	Oct 20, 2015	Jul 19, 2016		
Organic Panic	Platform; strategy	Last Limb	Last Limb	Unreleased	Mar 29, 2016	Mar 29, 2016		
The Origin: Blind Maid	Survival horror	Warani Studios	Badland Publishing	Unreleased	TBA	TBA		
The Oriental Exorcist	2D; action; side-scroller	Wildfire Games	Bilibili	TBA	TBA	TBA		
Othercide	Tactical role-playing	Lightbulb Crew	Focus Home Interactive	Unreleased	Jul 28, 2020	Jul 28, 2020		
Oure	Adventure	Heavy Spectrum	Heavy Spectrum	Nov 1, 2017	Oct 30, 2017	Oct 30, 2017		
Our World is Ended	Visual novel	Red Entertainment	JP: Mages; WW: PQube	Feb 28, 2019	Apr 18, 2019	Apr 18, 2019		
Out Of Space: Couch Edition	Strategy; party	Behold Studios	Plug In Digital	Unreleased	Nov 25, 2020	Nov 25, 2020		
Outer Wilds	First-person adventure	Mobius Digital	Annapurna Interactive	Oct 25, 2019	Oct 15, 2019	Oct 15, 2019		
The Outer Worlds	Action role-playing	Obsidian Entertainment	Private Division	Oct 25, 2019	Oct 25, 2019	Oct 25, 2019		
Outlast	Survival horror	Red Barrels Studio	Red Barrels Studio	Unreleased	Feb 4, 2014	Feb 5, 2014		
Outlast 2	Survival horror	Red Barrels Studio	Red Barrels Studio	Unreleased	Apr 25, 2017	Apr 25, 2017	P	
Outriders	Third-person shooter	People Can Fly	Square Enix	Feb 1, 2021	Feb 2, 2021	Feb 2, 2021	CB P	
Outward: The Adventurer Life Sim	Role-playing	Nine Dots Studio	Koch Media	Dec 9, 2020	Mar 26, 2019	Mar 26, 2019		
Overcooked	Party, puzzle	Ghost Town Games	Team17	Unreleased	Aug 3, 2016	Aug 3, 2016		
Overcooked 2	Party, puzzle	Ghost Town Games	Team17	Aug 7, 2018	Aug 7, 2018	Aug 7, 2018		
Overland	Turn-based tactics; survival	Finji; Deep Plaid Games	Finji	Unreleased	Sep 19, 2019	Sep 19, 2019		
Overload	First-person shooter	Revival Productions	Revival Productions	Unreleased	Oct 24, 2018	Oct 16, 2018		
Overlord: Fellowship of Evil	Action role-playing	Codemasters	Codemasters	Unreleased	Oct 20, 2015	Oct 20, 2015		
Override: Mech City Brawl	Beat 'em up	The Balance, Inc	JP: 3goo; WW: Modus Games	Apr 18, 2019	Dec 4, 2018	Dec 4, 2018		
Override 2: Super Mech League	Beat 'em up	Modus Studios Brazil	Modus Games	Unreleased	Dec 22, 2020	Dec 22, 2020	CB	
Overruled!	Brawler	Dlala Studios	Team17	Unreleased	Sep 15, 2015	Sep 18, 2015		
Overwatch	First-person shooter	Blizzard Entertainment	Blizzard Entertainment	May 24, 2016	May 24, 2016	May 24, 2016	P	
Overwatch 2	First-person shooter	Blizzard Entertainment	Blizzard Entertainment	TBA	TBA	TBA	P	
Ovivo	Platform	Izhard	Sometimes You	Unreleased	Jul 3, 2019	Jul 3, 2019	P	
Owlboy	Platform-adventure	D-Pad Studio	D-Pad Studio	Apr 10, 2018	Apr 10, 2018	Apr 10, 2018		
Oxenfree	Adventure	Night School Studio	Night School Studio	Unreleased	May 31, 2016	May 31, 2016		
Oxenfree II: Lost Signals	Adventure	Night School Studio	MWM Interactive	Unreleased	Jul 12, 2023	Jul 12, 2023		
Pacer	Racing	R8 Games	R8 Games	Oct 29, 2020	Oct 29, 2020	Oct 29, 2020		
Pac-Man 256	Arcade	Hipster Whale	Bandai Namco Entertainment	Jun 21, 2016	Jun 21, 2016	Jun 21, 2016		
Pac-Man Championship Edition 2	Arcade	Bandai Namco Entertainment	Bandai Namco Entertainment	Sep 13, 2016	Sep 13, 2016	Sep 13, 2016		
Pac-Man Museum +	Arcade	Now Production	Bandai Namco Entertainment	May 26, 2022	May 27, 2022	May 27, 2022		
Pac-Man World Re-Pac	Platform	Now Production	Bandai Namco Entertainment	Aug 26, 2022	Aug 26, 2022	Aug 26, 2022		
Paleo Pines	Farm life sim	Italic Pig	Modus Games	Sep 26, 2023	Sep 26, 2023	Sep 26, 2023		
Panorama Cotton	Shoot 'em up	Success	JP: Sunsoft; WW: ININ Games	Oct 29, 2021	Oct 29, 2021	Oct 29, 2021		
Panda Hero	Platform	Markt & Technik	Markt & Technik	Unreleased	Jan 10, 2019	Jan 14, 2019		
Pang Adventures	Platform; puzzle	Pastagames	DotEmu	Unreleased	Apr 19, 2016	Apr 19, 2016		
Pankapu	Adventure; platform	Too Kind Studio	Plug In Digital	Unreleased	Sep 19, 2017	Sep 20, 2017		
Panzer Dragoon: Remake	Rail shooter	MegaPixel Studio	Forever Entertainment	Unreleased	Sep 28, 2020	Sep 28, 2020		
Papa's Quiz	Party	Old Apes	Old Apes	Unreleased	Jan 24, 2021	Feb 18, 2020		
Paper Beast	Adventure	Pixel Reef	Pixel Reef	Unreleased	Mar 24, 2020	Mar 24, 2020	P VR	
Paradise Lost	Adventure	PolyAmorous	All in! Games	Mar 24, 2021	Mar 24, 2021	Mar 24, 2021		
Paranautical Activity	Platform; puzzle	CodeAvarice	Digerati	Dec 21, 2016	May 31, 2016	Jun 1, 2016		
PaRappa the Rapper Remastered	Rhythm	NanaOn-Sha	Sony Interactive Entertainment	Apr 20, 2017	Apr 4, 2017	Apr 4, 2017	P	
Parfait Remake	Visual novel	Giga; Dai	Entergram	Nov 25, 2021	Unreleased	Unreleased		
The Park	Horror	Funcom	Funcom	May 3, 2016	May 3, 2016	May 3, 2016		
Party Animals	Party	Recreate Games	Recreate Games	Unreleased	TBA	TBA		
Party Crashers	Racing	Giant Margarita	Giant Margarita	Unreleased	Oct 4, 2018	Oct 4, 2018		
Party Crasher Simulator	Simulation	Glob Games Studio	Glob Games Studio	TBA	TBA	TBA		
Party Golf	Party	Giant Margarita	Giant Margarita	Unreleased	Oct 26, 2016	Oct 4, 2016		
Party Hard	Action; stealth	Pinokl Games	TinyBuild	Unreleased	Apr 26, 2016	Apr 26, 2016		
Party Hard 2	Action; stealth	Pinokl Games	TinyBuild	Unreleased	Apr 26, 2016	Apr 26, 2016		
Party Panic	Party	Everglow Interactive	Everglow Interactive	Unreleased	Aug 21, 2020	Aug 21, 2020		
Patapon Remastered	Rhythm; god game	Japan Studio	Sony Interactive Entertainment	Aug 1, 2017	Aug 1, 2017	Aug 1, 2017	P	
Patapon 2 Remastered	Rhythm; god game	Japan Studio	Sony Interactive Entertainment	Jan 30, 2020	Jan 30, 2020	Jan 30, 2020	P	
Pathfinder: Kingmaker	Role-playing	Owlcat Games	Deep Silver	Unreleased	Aug 18, 2020	Aug 18, 2020		
Pathfinder: Wrath of the Righteous	Role-playing	Owlcat Games	META Publishing	Unreleased	Sep 29, 2022	Sep 29, 2022		
The Pathless	Action-adventure	Giant Squid	Annapurna Interactive	Nov 11, 2020	Nov 12, 2020	Nov 12, 2020	CB	
Path of Sin: Greed	Puzzle; hidden object	Cordelia Games	Artifex Mundi	Unreleased	Aug 20, 2019	Aug 20, 2019		
Pathologic 2	Adventure; survival	Ice-Pick Lodge	Ice-Pick Lodge	Mar 6, 2020	Mar 6, 2020	Mar 6, 2020		
Pato Box	Action; sports	Bromio	Bromio	May 16, 2019	Aug 28, 2018	Unreleased		
Paw Paw Paw	Action-adventure	Simpleton	Ratalaika Games	Dec 2, 2020	Dec 1, 2020	Dec 2, 2020		
PAW Patrol: On a Roll	Platform	Torus Games	Outright Games	Unreleased	Oct 26, 2018	Oct 23, 2018		
PAW Patrol Mighty Pups: Save Adventure Bay	Action-adventure	Drakhar Studio	Outright Games	Unreleased	Nov 6, 2020	Nov 6, 2020		
Pawarumi	Shoot 'em up	Manufacture 43	Manufacture 43	Feb 14, 2020	Feb 11, 2020	Jun 25, 2020	P	
Payday 2: Crimewave Edition	First-person shooter	Overkill Software	505 Games	Unreleased	Jun 16, 2015	Jun 10, 2015		
PC Building Simulator	Simulation	Claudiu Kiss, TIC	The Irregular Corporation	Unreleased	Aug 13, 2019	Aug 13, 2019		
Peaky Blinders: Mastermind	Action-adventure	FuturLab	Curve Digital	Unreleased	Aug 20, 2020	Aug 20, 2020		
The Peanuts Movie: Snoopy's Grand Adventure	Platform	Behaviour Santiago	Activision	Unreleased	Nov 3, 2015	Nov 6, 2015		
The Pedestrian	Puzzle-platform	Skookum Arts	Skookum Arts	Unreleased	Jan 29, 2021	Jan 29, 2021		
Peggle 2	Puzzle	PopCap Games	Electronic Arts	Oct 21, 2014	Oct 14, 2014	Oct 15, 2014		
Penarium	Platform	Self Made Miracle	Team17	Unreleased	Sep 22, 2015	Sep 22, 2015		
Penguin Wars	Action	City Connection	City Connection	Aug 1, 2019	Sep 25, 2018	Sep 25, 2018		
Perception	Adventure; horror	Deep End Games	Feardemic	Unreleased	Jun 7, 2017	Jun 7, 2017		
Perfect Universe	Action; puzzle	Will Sykes Games	Will Sykes Games	Nov 9, 2016	May 17, 2016	May 17, 2016		
Persian Nights: Sands of Wonders	Puzzle; hidden object	SoDigital	Artifex Mundi	Unreleased	Aug 17, 2018	Aug 17, 2018		
Persian Nights 2: Moonlight Veil	Puzzle; hidden object	SoDigital	Artifex Mundi	Unreleased	Dec 11, 2020	Dec 11, 2020	P	
The Persistence	First-person shooter	Firesprite	Firesprite	Jan 21, 2019	Jul 24, 2018	Jul 24, 2018	VR	
Persona 3: Dancing in Moonlight	Rhythm	P-Studio	Atlus	May 24, 2018	Dec 4, 2018	Dec 4, 2018		
Persona 3 Reload	Role-Playing	P-Studio	Sega; Atlus	Feb 2, 2024	Feb 2, 2024	Feb 2, 2024		
Persona 3 Portable	Role-Playing	Atlus	Sega	Jan 19, 2023	Jan 19, 2023	Jan 19, 2023		
Persona 4 Arena Ultimax	Fighting	Arc System Works; P-Studio	Atlas	Mar 17, 2022	Mar 17, 2022	Mar 17, 2022		
Persona 4: Dancing All Night	Rhythm	P-Studio	Atlus	May 24, 2018	Dec 4, 2018	Dec 4, 2018		
Persona 4 Golden	Role-Playing	Atlus	Sega	Jan 19, 2023	Jan 19, 2023	Jan 19, 2023		
Persona 5	Role-playing	P-Studio	Atlus	Sep 15, 2016	Apr 4, 2017	Apr 4, 2017		
Persona 5: Dancing Star Night	Rhythm	P-Studio	Atlus	May 24, 2018	Dec 4, 2018	Dec 4, 2018		
Persona 5 Royal	Role-playing	P-Studio	Atlus	Oct 31, 2019	Mar 31, 2020	Mar 31, 2020		
Persona 5 Strikers	Action role-playing	Omega Force; P-Studio	JP: Atlus; WW: Koei Tecmo	Feb 20, 2020	Feb 23, 2021	Feb 23, 2021	P	
Persona 5 Tactica	Role-playing	P-Studio	Atlus	Nov 17, 2023	Nov 17, 2023	Nov 17, 2023		
Petal Crash	Puzzle	Friend & Fairy	GalaxyTrail	Unreleased	Oct 12, 2020	Oct 12, 2020		
PGA Tour 2K21	Sports	HB Studios	2K Games	Aug 21, 2020	Aug 21, 2020	Aug 21, 2020		
Phantom Breaker: Battle Grounds Overdrive	Beat 'em up	5pb.	5pb.	Jul 21, 2015	Jul 23, 2015	Aug 17, 2015		
Phantom Breaker: Omnia	Fighting	GameLoop; Mages	Rocket Panda Games	Mar 15, 2022	Mar 15, 2022	Mar 15, 2022		
Phantom Doctrine	Turn-based strategy	CreativeForge Games	Good Shepherd Entertainment	Unreleased	Aug 14, 2018	Aug 14, 2018		
Phantom Trigger	Role-playing	Bread Team	tinyBuild	Unreleased	Aug 10, 2017	Aug 10, 2017		
Phar Lap - Horse Racing Challenge	Racing; simulation	PikPok	Home Entertainment Suppliers	Nov 29, 2020	Mar 26, 2019	Mar 22, 2019		
Pharaonic	Action role-playing	Milkstone Studios	Milkstone Studios	Unreleased	Jun 28, 2016	Jun 28, 2016		
Phoenix Point	Strategy; turn-based tactics	Snapshot Games	Snapshot Games	Oct 1, 2021	Oct 1, 2021	Oct 1, 2021		
Phoenix Wright: Ace Attorney Trilogy	Visual novel	Capcom	Capcom	Unreleased	Apr 9, 2019	Apr 9, 2019		
Phoenotopia: Awakening	Action-adventure; Metroidvania; Platformer	Cape Cosmic	Flyhigh Works	Jul 2, 2021	Jul 2, 2021	Jul 2, 2021		
Phogs!	Adventure; puzzle-platform	Bit Loom Games	Coatsink	Dec 3, 2020	Dec 3, 2020	Dec 3, 2020		
Pic-a-Pix Classic	Nonogram; puzzle	Lightwood Games	Lightwood Games	Unreleased	Feb 26, 2019	Feb 26, 2019		
Pic-a-Pix Classic 2	Nonogram; puzzle	Lightwood Games	Lightwood Games	Unreleased	Nov 26, 2019	Nov 26, 2019		
Pic-a-Pix Color	Nonogram; puzzle	Lightwood Games	Lightwood Games	Unreleased	Apr 24, 2018	Apr 25, 2018		
Pic-a-Pix Color 2	Nonogram; puzzle	Lightwood Games	Lightwood Games	Unreleased	Jul 9, 2019	Jul 9, 2019		
Pic-a-Pix Pieces	Nonogram; puzzle	Lightwood Games	JP: Rainy Frog; WW: Lightwood Games	Mar 20, 2019	Jan 8, 2019	Jan 8, 2019		
Pic-a-Pix Pieces 2	Nonogram; puzzle	Lightwood Games	Lightwood Games	Unreleased	Jun 30, 2020	Jun 30, 2020		
Pier Solar and the Great Architects	Role-playing	WaterMelon	WaterMelon	Sep 30, 2014	Sep 30, 2014	Sep 30, 2014		
Pig Eat Ball	Arcade; puzzle	Mommy's Best Games	Mommy's Best Games	Unreleased	Oct 18, 2019	Oct 18, 2019		
Pillar	Puzzle	MichaelArts	MichaelArts	Feb 17, 2015	Feb 17, 2015	Feb 17, 2015		
Pillars of Eternity	Role-playing	Obsidian Entertainment	Paradox Interactive	Aug 22, 2017	Aug 22, 2017	Aug 22, 2017		
Pillars of Eternity II: Deadfire	Role-playing	Obsidian Entertainment	THQ Nordic	Jan 28, 2020	Jan 28, 2020	Jan 28, 2020		
The Pillars of the Earth	Adventure	Daedalic Entertainment	Daedalic Entertainment	Unreleased	Aug 15, 2017	Aug 16, 2017		
Pinstripe	Adventure; puzzle	Atmos Games	Armor Games	Sep 24, 2020	Feb 12, 2018	Feb 13, 2018		
PixArk	Survival	Snail Games	Snail Games	Jul 4, 2019	Jun 4, 2019	May 31, 2019		
Pix the Cat	Arcade	Pasta Games	Pasta Games	Oct 7, 2014	Oct 7, 2014	Oct 7, 2014		
Pixel Piracy	Role-playing	Abstraction Games; 505 Games	Re-Logic	Unreleased	Feb 16, 2016	Feb 17, 2016		
PixelJunk Monsters 2	Tower defense	Q-Games	Spike Chunsoft	May 25, 2018	May 25, 2018	May 25, 2018		
PixelJunk Shooter Ultimate	Shooter	Double Eleven; Q-Games	Sony Computer Entertainment	Jun 18, 2014	Jun 3, 2014	Jun 4, 2014	CP	
Pixel Noir	Role-playing	SWDTech Games	SWDTech Games	TBA	TBA	TBA		
Plague Inc: Evolved	Strategy	Ndemic Creations	Ndemic Creations	May 30, 2016	May 30, 2016	May 30, 2016		
Planescape: Torment: Enhanced Edition	Role-playing	Beamdog	Skybound Games	Unreleased	Sep 24, 2019	Sep 27, 2019		
Planet 2000	Action	Bionic Pony	Bionic Pony	Unreleased	Jan 11, 2017	Unreleased		
Planet Coaster: Console Edition	Construction and management simulation	Frontier Developments	Frontier Developments	Nov 11, 2020	Nov 12, 2020	Nov 12, 2020	CB	
Planet of the Apes: Last Frontier	Interactive fiction	The Imaginati Studios	FoxNext	Oct 8, 2019	Nov 21, 2017	Nov 21, 2017	PL	
Plants vs Zombies: Battle for Neighborville	Third-person shooter	PopCap Games	Electronic Arts	Oct 18, 2019	Oct 18, 2019	Oct 18, 2019		
Plants vs. Zombies: Garden Warfare	Third-person shooter	PopCap Games	Electronic Arts	Sep 4, 2014	Aug 19, 2014	Aug 21, 2014		
Plants vs. Zombies: Garden Warfare 2	Third-person shooter	PopCap Games	Electronic Arts	Aug 24, 2016	Feb 23, 2016	Feb 23, 2016		
PlayerUnknown's Battlegrounds	Battle royale	Bluehole	Bluehole	Dec 7, 2018	Dec 7, 2018	Dec 7, 2018	CP P	
Plumbers Don't Wear Ties	Visual novel	United Pixtures	Limited Run Games	Mar 5, 2024	Mar 5, 2024	Mar 5, 2024		
Pneuma: Breath of Life	Puzzle	Deco Digital	Deco Digital	Jul 7, 2015	Jul 7, 2015	Jul 7, 2015		
PO'ed: Definitive Edition	First-person shooter	Nightdive Studios	Nightdive Studios	May 16, 2024	May 16, 2024	May 16, 2024		
Pocket Academy	Simulation	Kairosoft	Kairosoft	Aug 6, 2020	Aug 27, 2020	Unreleased		
Pocket Clothier	Simulation	Kairosoft	Kairosoft	Nov 11, 2020	Nov 12, 2020	Nov 12, 2020		
Pocket God vs Desert Ashes	Turn-based strategy	Bolt Creative	Nine-Tales Digital	Unreleased	Oct 20, 2015	Unreleased		
Pocket League Story	Simulation	Kairosoft	Kairosoft	Oct 21, 2020	Oct 22, 2020	Oct 22, 2020		
Pocket Stables	Simulation	Kairosoft	Kairosoft	Nov 11, 2020	Nov 12, 2020	Nov 12, 2020		
Pocky & Rocky Reshrined	Shoot 'em up	Natsume Atari	JP: Natsume Atari; WW: Natsume Inc.	Apr 21, 2022	Jun 24, 2022	Jun 24, 2022		
Pode	Adventure	Henchman & Goon	Altered Ventures	Unreleased	Feb 19, 2019	Feb 19, 2019		
Poi	3D platform	PolyKid	PolyKid	Unreleased	Jun 27, 2017	Jun 27, 2017		
Poison Control	Action role-playing	Nippon Ichi Software	JP: Nippon Ichi Software; WW: NIS America	Jun 25, 2020	Apr 13, 2021	Apr 16, 2021		
Poker Club	Card & board	Ripstone	Ripstone	Unreleased	Nov 19, 2020	Nov 19, 2020	CB CP	
Poker Night at the Inventory	Card & board	Skunkape Games	Skunkape Games	Unreleased	Mar 5, 2026	Mar 5, 2026		
Polarity: Ultimate Edition	Puzzle	Bluebutton	Bluebutton	Unreleased	May 30, 2017	Unreleased		
Police Stories	Top-down shooter	Mighty Morgan	HypeTrain Digital	Unreleased	Sep 19, 2019	Sep 19, 2019		
Polybius	Shoot 'em up	Llamasoft	Llamasoft	Unreleased	May 7, 2017	May 7, 2017	3D P VR	
Ponpu	Action	Purple Tree Studio	Zordix Publishing	Unreleased	Dec 2, 2020	Dec 2, 2020		
Pool Nation	Sports	Cherry Pop Games	Cherry Pop Games	Feb 22, 2014	Jul 9, 2019	Jul 9, 2019		
Pool Slide Story	Business simulation	Kairosoft	Kairosoft	Jul 6, 2020	Jul 16, 2020	Unreleased		
Poop Slinger	Casual	Diggity.net	Diggitynet	Aug 5, 2018	Aug 5, 2018	Aug 5, 2018		
Portal Knights	Role-playing	Keen Games	505 Games	Jun 29, 2017	May 2, 2017	Apr 28, 2017	P	
Port Royale 4	Business simulation; strategy	Gaming Minds	Kalypso Media	Unreleased	Sep 25, 2020	Sep 25, 2020		
Postal Redux	Shoot 'em up	Running with Scissors	MD Games	Unreleased	Mar 5, 2021	Mar 5, 2021		
Potata	Action-adventure	Potata Company	Sometimes You	Unreleased	May 13, 2020	May 13, 2020		
Potion Permit	Role-playing	MassHive Media	PQube	Unreleased	TBA	TBA		
Power Rangers: Battle for the Grid	Beat 'em up; fighting	nWay Games	Lionsgate Games	Apr 2, 2019	Apr 2, 2019	Apr 2, 2019	CP	
Powerful Professional Baseball 2024-2025	Sports	Konami	Konami	Jul 17, 2024	Unreleased	Unreleased		
Praetorians - HD Remaster	Real-time strategy	Torus Games	Kalypso Media	Unreleased	Sep 18, 2020	Sep 18, 2020		
Praey for the Gods	Action-adventure	No Matter Studios	No Matter Studios	Dec 14, 2021	Dec 14, 2021	Dec 14, 2021	CB	
Predator: Hunting Grounds	First-person shooter	IllFonic; 20th Century Fox	Sony Interactive Entertainment	Apr 24, 2020	Apr 24, 2020	Apr 24, 2020	CP P	
Predecessor	Multiplayer online battle arena	Omeda Studios	Omeda Studios	Aug 20, 2024	Aug 20, 2024	Aug 20, 2024		
Pressure Overdrive	Vehicular combat	Chasing Carrots	Chasing Carrots	Unreleased	Jul 25, 2017	Jul 25, 2017		
Prey	First-person shooter	Arkane Studios	Bethesda Softworks	May 18, 2017	May 5, 2017	May 5, 2017	P	
Primal Carnage: Extinction	First-person shooter	Panic Button	Circle 5 Studios	Unreleased	Oct 20, 2015	Nov 24, 2015		
Prince of Persia: The Lost Crown	Action-adventure; platform; metroidvania	Ubisoft Montpellier	Ubisoft	Jan 18, 2024	Jan 18, 2024	Jan 18, 2024		
Princess Crown	Action role-playing	Atlus	Atlus	Jan 31, 2020	Unreleased	Unreleased		
Prismatic Solid	Shoot 'em up	Yo1 Komori Games	Playism	Feb 19, 2015	Sep 29, 2015	Sep 29, 2015		
Prison Architect	Simulation	Double Eleven	Introversion Software	Aug 23, 2016	Jun 28, 2016	Jun 28, 2016		
Pro Evolution Soccer 2015	Sports	PES Productions	Konami	Nov 13, 2014	Nov 13, 2014	Nov 13, 2014		
Pro Evolution Soccer 2016	Sports	PES Productions	Konami	Sep 18, 2015	Sep 15, 2015	Sep 17, 2015		
Pro Evolution Soccer 2017	Sports	PES Productions	Konami	Sep 15, 2016	Sep 13, 2016	Sep 15, 2016	P	
Pro Evolution Soccer 2018	Sports	PES Productions	Konami	Sep 14, 2017	Sep 14, 2017	Sep 14, 2017	P	
Pro Evolution Soccer 2019	Sports	PES Productions	Konami	Aug 29, 2018	Aug 29, 2018	Aug 29, 2018	P	
Pro Fishing Simulator	Sports	Sanuk Games	Bigben Interactive	Unreleased	Feb 5, 2019	Nov 29, 2018		
Pro Yakyū Spirits 2019	Sports	Konami	Konami	Jul 18, 2019	Unreleased	Unreleased		
The Procession to Calvary	Point-and-click adventure	Joe Richardson	Digerati	TBA	TBA	TBA		
Professional Farmer 2017	Simulation	Visual Imagination	United Independent Entertainment	Sep 13, 2017	Jun 10, 2016	Jun 10, 2016		
Professor Rubik's Brain Fitness	Puzzle	Magic Pockets	Microids	Unreleased	Nov 24, 2020	Nov 12, 2020		
Project Awakening	Action	Cygames Osaka	Cygames	TBA	TBA	TBA		
Project Cars	Racing; simulation	Slightly Mad Studios	Bandai Namco Entertainment	May 7, 2015	May 12, 2015	May 7, 2015		
Project Cars 2	Racing; simulation	Slightly Mad Studios	Bandai Namco Entertainment	Sep 22, 2017	Sep 22, 2017	Sep 22, 2017	P	
Project Cars 3	Racing; simulation	Slightly Mad Studios	Bandai Namco Entertainment	Aug 28, 2020	Aug 28, 2020	Aug 28, 2020	P	
Project Dunk	Sports	Giant Games	Giant Games	TBA	TBA	TBA		
Project Highrise: Architect's Edition	Simulation	Somasim	Kalypso Media	Apr 25, 2019	Oct 26, 2018	Nov 13, 2018		
Project Nimbus: Code Mirai	Action; mech	GameTomo	Kiss	Nov 21, 2017	Aug 29, 2019	Apr 11, 2018		
Project Phoenix	Real-time strategy	Creative Intelligence Arts	Creative Intelligence Arts	TBA	TBA	TBA		
Project Sakura Wars	Role-playing	Sega CS2 R&D	Sega	Dec 12, 2019	Apr 28, 2020	Apr 28, 2020		
Project Warlock	First-person shooter	Buckshot Software	Crunching Koalas	Unreleased	Jun 9, 2020	Jun 9, 2020		
Project Witchstone	Role-playing; sandbox	Spearhead Games	Spearhead Games	TBA	TBA	TBA		
Projection: First Light	Puzzle-platform	Shadowplay Studios	Blowfish Studios	Unreleased	Sep 29, 2020	Sep 29, 2020		
Prototype	Action-adventure	Radical Entertainment	Activision	Unreleased	Aug 11, 2015	Aug 19, 2015		
Prototype 2	Action-adventure	Radical Entertainment	Activision	Unreleased	Aug 11, 2015	Aug 20, 2015		
Psikyo Shooting Collection	Arcade; shoot 'em up	Zerodiv	City Connection	TBA	TBA	TBA		
Psycho-Pass: Mandatory Happiness	Visual novel	Nitroplus	5pb.	Mar 24, 2016	Sep 13, 2016	Sep 16, 2016		
Psychonauts 2	Platform	Double Fine Productions	Xbox Game Studios	Aug 25, 2021	Aug 25, 2021	Aug 25, 2021		
Psyvariar Delta	Shoot 'em up	City Connection	JP: City Connection; NA: Dispatch Games	Aug 30, 2018	Jul 2, 2019	Unreleased		
Puchitto Cluster	Action; puzzle	Ullucus Heaven	Ullucus Heaven	Apr 2, 2020	Unreleased	Unreleased		
Puddle	Puzzle	Neko Entertainment	Konami	Unreleased	Jul 1, 2014	May 28, 2014		
Pumped BMX +	Sports	Yeah Us / Curve Digital	Curve Digital	Unreleased	Sep 22, 2015	Sep 22, 2015		
Pumpkin Jack	Platform	Nicolas Meyssonnier	Headup Games	Unreleased	Feb 24, 2021	Feb 24, 2021		
Punch Club	Beat 'em up	Lazy Bear Games	TinyBuild	Unreleased	Mar 31, 2017	Mar 31, 2017		
Punch Line	Adventure	5pb.	JP: 5pb.; WW: PQube	Apr 28, 2016	Sep 25, 2018	Aug 31, 2018		
Pure Chess	Chess	VooFoo Studios	VooFoo Studios	Unreleased	Apr 15, 2014	Apr 16, 2014		
Pure Farming 2018	Simulation	Ice Flames	Techland	Unreleased	Mar 13, 2018	Mar 13, 2018		
Pure Hold'em	Card game	VooFoo Studios	VooFoo Studios	Unreleased	Aug 19, 2015	Aug 18, 2015		
Pure Pool	Sports	VooFoo Studios	Ripstone	Unreleased	Jul 29, 2014	Jul 30, 2014		
Push Me Pull You	Party	House House	House House	May 3, 2016	May 3, 2016	May 3, 2016		
Putty Squad	Platform	System 3	System 3	Dec 29, 2015	Mar 11, 2014	Nov 29, 2013		
Puyo Puyo Champions	Puzzle	Sonic Team	Sega	Oct 25, 2018	May 7, 2019	May 7, 2019		
Puyo Puyo Tetris	Puzzle	Sonic Team	Sega	Dec 4, 2014	Apr 28, 2017	Apr 25, 2017		
Puyo Puyo Tetris 2	Puzzle	Sonic Team	Sega	Dec 9, 2020	Dec 8, 2020	Dec 8, 2020	CB	
Puzzle by Nikoli 4: Akari	Puzzle	Hamster	Hamster	Oct 30, 2014	Unreleased	Unreleased		
Puzzle by Nikoli 4: Hashiwokakero	Puzzle	Hamster	Hamster	Mar 26, 2015	Unreleased	Unreleased		
Puzzle by Nikoli 4: Heyawake	Puzzle	Hamster	Hamster	Sep 11, 2014	Unreleased	Unreleased		
Puzzle by Nikoli 4: Kakuro	Puzzle	Hamster	Hamster	Jul 17, 2014	Unreleased	Unreleased		
Puzzle by Nikoli 4: Masyu	Puzzle	Hamster	Hamster	Nov 6, 2014	Unreleased	Unreleased		
Puzzle by Nikoli 4: Nurikabe	Puzzle	Hamster	Hamster	Aug 21, 2014	Unreleased	Unreleased		
Puzzle by Nikoli 4: Slitherlink	Puzzle	Hamster	Hamster	Jul 31, 2014	Unreleased	Unreleased		
The Pyraplex	Simulation	Kairosoft	Kairosoft	Nov 11, 2020	Nov 12, 2020	Nov 12, 2020		
Pyre	Role-playing	Supergiant Games	Supergiant Games	Unreleased	Jul 25, 2017	Jul 25, 2017	P	
Q*bert Rebooted	Platform; puzzle	Loot Interactive	Loot Interactive	Unreleased	Feb 17, 2015	Feb 18, 2015		
Quantum Error	First-person shooter	TeamKill Media	TeamKill Media	TBA	TBA	TBA		
Quantum Replica	Stealth; action	ON3D Studios	PQube	Unreleased	May 13, 2021	May 13, 2021		
Q.U.B.E. Director's Cut	Puzzle	Grip Games	Grip Games	Unreleased	Jul 21, 2015	Jul 22, 2015		
Q.U.B.E. 2	Puzzle	Toxic Games	Toxic Games	Mar 13, 2018	Mar 13, 2018	Mar 13, 2018		
Queen's Quest 2: Stories of Forgotten Past	Puzzle; hidden object	Brave Giant	Artifex Mundi	Unreleased	Feb 22, 2019	Feb 22, 2019		
Queen's Quest 3: The End of Dawn	Puzzle; hidden object	Brave Giant	Artifex Mundi	Unreleased	Jun 11, 2019	Jun 11, 2019		
Queen's Quest 4: Sacred Truce	Puzzle; hidden object	Brave Giant	Artifex Mundi	Unreleased	Oct 8, 2019	Oct 8, 2019		
Quest of Dungeons	Turn-based, roguelike	Upfall Studios	Upfall Studios	Jan 17, 2017	Jan 17, 2017	Jan 17, 2017		
Quiplash	Party; trivia	Jackbox Games	Jackbox Games	Unreleased	Jun 30, 2015	Sep 15, 2015		
Quiplash 2: InterLASHional	Party; trivia	Jackbox Games	Jackbox Games	Unreleased	Dec 3, 2020	Dec 3, 2020		
Quiz Thiz Austria	Trivia	ThiGames	ThiGames	Mar 6, 2023	Mar 6, 2023	Mar 6, 2023		
Quiz Thiz Croatia	Trivia	ThiGames	ThiGames	Mar 27, 2023	Mar 27, 2023	Mar 27, 2023		
Quiz Thiz France	Trivia	ThiGames	ThiGames	Jan 6, 2023	Jan 6, 2023	Jan 6, 2023		
Quiz Thiz Germany	Trivia	ThiGames	ThiGames	Mar 20, 2023	Mar 20, 2023	Mar 20, 2023		
Quiz Thiz Italy	Trivia	ThiGames	ThiGames	Mar 12, 2023	Mar 12, 2023	Mar 12, 2023		
Quiz Thiz Spain	Trivia	ThiGames	ThiGames	Feb 4, 2023	Feb 4, 2023	Feb 4, 2023		
Quiz Thiz United Kingdom	Trivia	ThiGames	ThiGames	Dec 10, 2022	Dec 10, 2022	Dec 10, 2022		
Quiz Thiz USA	Trivia	ThiGames	ThiGames	Nov 18, 2022	Nov 18, 2022	Nov 18, 2022		
R-Type Dimensions EX	Shoot 'em up	Irem	Tozai Games	Dec 19, 2018	Dec 20, 2018	Dec 19, 2018		
R-Type Final 2	Shoot 'em up	Granzella	JP: Granzella; WW: NIS America	Apr 29, 2021	Apr 30, 2021	Apr 30, 2021		
Rabbids Invasion	Action	Ubisoft Barcelona	Ubisoft	Nov 18, 2014	Nov 18, 2014	Nov 18, 2014	C M	
Rabbids: Party of Legends	Party	Ubisoft Chengdu	Ubisoft	Jun 30, 2022	Jun 30, 2022	Jun 30, 2022		
Rabi-Ribi	2D platform	CreSpirit	Sekai Project	Jun 21, 2018	Oct 31, 2017	Sep 1, 2017		
Race Arcade	Racing	Iceflake Studio	Iceflake Studio	Jul 10, 2018	Jul 10, 2018	Jul 10, 2018		
Race the Sun	Racing	Flippfly	Flippfly	Oct 21, 2015	Oct 21, 2014	Oct 21, 2014	VR	
Rad	Action, roguelike	Double Fine	Bandai Namco Entertainment	Unreleased	Aug 20, 2019	Aug 20, 2019		
Rad Rodgers	Action; platform	Slipgate Studios	THQ Nordic	Mar 19, 2020	Feb 21, 2018	Feb 21, 2018		
Radial-G: Racing Revolved	Racing	Tammeka	Tammeka	Unreleased	Oct 10, 2017	Sep 12, 2017	VR	
Rage 2	First-person shooter	Avalanche Studios	Bethesda Softworks	Jun 6, 2019	May 14, 2019	May 14, 2019		
Rage of the Dragons	Fighting	QUByte Entertainment	QUByte Entertainment	TBA	TBA	TBA		
Raging Loop	Visual novel	Kemco	JP: Kemco; WW: PQube	Mar 1, 2019	Oct 22, 2019	Oct 18, 2019		
Raiden V: Director's Cut	Shoot 'em up	Moss	UFO Interactive Games	Sep 14, 2017	Oct 5, 2017	Oct 5, 2017		
Raiders of the Broken Planet	Action-adventure	MercurySteam	MercurySteam	Unreleased	Sep 22, 2017	Sep 22, 2017	P	
Raidou Remastered: The Mystery of the Soulless Army	Action role-playing	Atlus	Atlus	Jun 19, 2025	Jun 19, 2025	Jun 19, 2025		
Raid: World War II	Tactical shooter	Lion Game Lion	Starbreeze	Unreleased	Oct 13, 2017	Oct 13, 2017		
Railway Empire	Simulation	Gaming Minds Studios	Kalypso Media	May 31, 2018	Jan 26, 2018	Jan 26, 2018		
Rainbow Billy: The Curse of the Leviathan	Platform	ManaVoid Entertainment	Skybound Games	Unreleased	Oct 5, 2021	Oct 5, 2021		
Rainbow Mix Advanced	Action	Webnetic s. r. o.	Webnetic s. r. o.	Aug 31, 2022	Aug 31, 2022	Aug 31, 2022		
Rainbow Moon	Tactical role-playing	SideQuest Studios	EastAsiaSoft	Jun 30, 2016	Feb 16, 2016	Feb 17, 2016		
Rainbow Skies	Tactical role-playing	SideQuest Studios	EastAsiaSoft	Dec 20, 2018	Jun 26, 2018	Jun 26, 2018		
Rain City	Adventure	Prism Plus	Prism Plus	TBA	TBA	TBA		
Rain World	Platform	James Primate	Adult Swim Games	Mar 28, 2017	Mar 28, 2017	Mar 28, 2017		
Raji: An Ancient Epic	Action-adventure	Nodding Heads Games	Super Dot Com	Unreleased	Oct 15, 2020	Oct 15, 2020		
Rally Copters	Racing	Depth First Games	Depth First Games	Unreleased	Sep 22, 2015	Jul 19, 2016		
Randall	Action; platform	We The Force	We The Force	Unreleased	Jun 6, 2017	Jun 6, 2017	P	
Rangok Skies	Arcade; shoot 'em up	Samurai Games	Digerati	Unreleased	TBA	TBA		
Raspberry Cube	Adventure	Madosoft	iMeL	Aug 29, 2019	Unreleased	Unreleased		
Ratchet & Clank	Platform	Insomniac Games	Sony Computer Entertainment	Aug 9, 2016	Apr 12, 2016	Apr 22, 2016	P	
The Raven Remastered	Graphic adventure	King Art Games	THQ Nordic	Unreleased	Mar 13, 2018	Mar 13, 2018		
Rayman Legends	Platform	Ubisoft Montpellier	Ubisoft	Unreleased	Feb 18, 2014	Feb 21, 2014		
Ray's the Dead	Action; puzzle; strategy	Ragtag Studio	Ragtag Studio	Unreleased	Oct 22, 2020	Oct 22, 2020		
R.B.I. Baseball 14	Sports	Behaviour Interactive	MLB Advanced Media	Unreleased	Jun 24, 2014	Unreleased		
R.B.I. Baseball 15	Sports	HB Studios	MLB Advanced Media	Unreleased	Mar 31, 2015	Unreleased		
R.B.I. Baseball 16	Sports	HB Studios	MLB Advanced Media	Unreleased	Apr 5, 2016	Apr 6, 2016		
R.B.I. Baseball 17	Sports	MLB Advanced Media	MLB Advanced Media	Unreleased	Mar 28, 2017	Mar 28, 2017		
R.B.I. Baseball 18	Sports	MLB Advanced Media	MLB Advanced Media	Unreleased	Mar 20, 2018	Mar 26, 2018		
R.B.I. Baseball 19	Sports	MLB Advanced Media	MLB Advanced Media	Unreleased	Mar 15, 2019	Mar 5, 2019		
R.B.I. Baseball 20	Sports	MLB Advanced Media	MLB Advanced Media	Unreleased	Mar 16, 2020	Mar 24, 2020		
R.B.I. Baseball 21	Sports	MLB Advanced Media	MLB Advanced Media	Unreleased	Mar 16, 2021	Mar 18, 2021		
Read Only Memories: Neurodiver	Graphic adventure	MidBoss	Midboss	TBA	TBA	TBA		
ReadySet Heroes	Dungeon crawler; arena brawler	Robot Entertainment	Sony Interactive Entertainment	Oct 1, 2019	Oct 1, 2019	Oct 1, 2019	CP	
Real Farm	Simulation	Triangle Studios	Soedesco	Jul 19, 2019	Oct 20, 2017	Oct 20, 2017		
Realms of Arkania: Blade of Destiny	Role-playing	Crafty Studios	Crafty Studios	Unreleased	Oct 16, 2017	Oct 12, 2017		
Realms of Arkania: Star Trail	Role-playing	Crafty Studios	Crafty Studios	Unreleased	Jun 26, 2018	Jun 26, 2018		
Rebel Cops	Turn-based strategy	Weappy	THQ Nordic	Unreleased	Sep 17, 2019	Sep 17, 2019		
Rebel Galaxy	Space adventure	Double Damage Games	Double Damage Games	Dec 7, 2016	Jan 5, 2016	Jan 12, 2016		
Rebel Galaxy Outlaw	Space adventure	Double Damage Games	Double Damage Games	Unreleased	Sep 22, 2020	Sep 22, 2020		
Record of Lodoss War: Deedlit in Wonder Labyrinth	Metroidvania	Team Ladybug; Why So Serious?	Playism	Dec 16, 2021	Dec 16, 2021	Dec 16, 2021		
Red Dead Online	Action-adventure	Rockstar Games	Rockstar Games	May 15, 2019	May 15, 2019	May 15, 2019		
Red Dead Redemption	Action-adventure	Rockstar San Diego	Rockstar Games	Aug 17, 2023	Aug 17, 2023	Aug 17, 2023		
Red Dead Redemption 2	Action-adventure	Rockstar Games	Take-Two Interactive	Oct 26, 2018	Oct 26, 2018	Oct 26, 2018	P	
Red Faction: Guerrilla Re-Mars-tered	Action-adventure	Kaiko	THQ Nordic	Jun 6, 2019	Jul 3, 2018	Jul 3, 2018		
Red Goddess: Inner World	Metroidvania	Yanim Studio	Yanim Studio	Unreleased	Jun 30, 2015	Jul 8, 2015		
Red Wings: Aces of the Sky	Action; simulation	All In! Games	All In! Games	Nov 5, 2020	Oct 13, 2020	Oct 13, 2020		
Redout	Racing	34BigThings	34BigThings	Apr 5, 2018	Aug 29, 2017	Aug 29, 2017	P	
Redout: Space Assault	Space combat	34BigThings	34BigThings	TBA	TBA	TBA		
Redeemer: Enhanced Edition	Beat 'em up; top-down shooter	Sobaka Studio	NA: Ravenscourt; EU: Deep Silver	Feb 27, 2020	Jul 19, 2019	Jul 19, 2019		
Reel Fishing: Road Trip Adventure	Fishing	Natsume Inc.	Natsume Inc.	Sep 11, 2020	Sep 11, 2019	Sep 17, 2019		
Refactor	Platform; puzzle	NextGen Pants	NextGen Pants	TBA	TBA	TBA		
Refight: The Last Warship	Survival	Fantian	Fantian	TBA	TBA	TBA		
Reflection of Mine	Action-adventure	Redblack Spade	Ratalaika Games	Unreleased	Oct 9, 2020	Oct 9, 2020		
Refunct	Platform	Dominique Grieshofer	Dominique Grieshofer	Unreleased	Jun 7, 2019	Jun 7, 2019		
Regalia: Of Men and Monarchs	Tactical role-playing	Pixelated Milk	Crunchng Koalas	Unreleased	Apr 10, 2018	Apr 10, 2018		
Regions of Ruin	Action role-playing; town-building	JanduSoft	JanduSoft	Unreleased	Dec 19, 2019	Dec 19, 2019		
Relayer	Tactical role-playing	Kadokawa Games	JP: Kadokawa Games; WW: Clouded Leopard Entertainment	Mar 24, 2022	Mar 24, 2022	Mar 24, 2022	CB	
Re:Legend	Role-playing	Magnus Games	505 Games	Unreleased	TBA	TBA		
Relicta	Environmental puzzle	Mighty Polygon	Ravenscourt	Unreleased	Aug 3, 2020	Aug 4, 2020		
Remnant: From the Ashes	Action, Shooter	Gunfire Games	Perfect World	Aug 20, 2019	Aug 20, 2019	Aug 20, 2019		
Remothered: Broken Porcelain	Survival horror	Stormind Games	Darril Arts	Unreleased	Oct 13, 2020	Oct 13, 2020		
Remothered: Tormented Fathers	Survival horror	Stormind Games	Darril Arts	Mar 19, 2020	Jul 25, 2018	Jul 25, 2018		
Replay: VHS is not dead	Puzzle	Neko Entertainment	Neko Entertainment	Unreleased	Feb 23, 2016	Feb 23, 2016		
Replica	Adventure	Somi	Playism	TBA	TBA	TBA		
République	Action-adventure; stealth	Camouflaj Logan Games	NA: Atlus; EU: NIS America	Apr 14, 2016	Mar 22, 2016	Mar 25, 2016		
Resident Evil 2	Survival horror	Capcom	Capcom	Jan 25, 2019	Jan 25, 2019	Jan 25, 2019	P	
Resident Evil 3	Survival horror	Capcom	Capcom	Apr 3, 2020	Apr 3, 2020	Apr 3, 2020	P	
Resident Evil 4	Survival horror	Capcom	Capcom	Aug 30, 2016	Aug 30, 2016	Aug 30, 2016		
Resident Evil 4 (remake)	Survival horror	Capcom	Capcom	Mar 30, 2023	Mar 30, 2023	Mar 30, 2023		
Resident Evil 5	Survival horror	Capcom	Capcom	Jun 28, 2016	Jun 28, 2016	Jun 28, 2016		
Resident Evil 6	Survival horror	Capcom	Capcom	Mar 29, 2016	Mar 29, 2016	Mar 29, 2016		
Resident Evil 7: Biohazard	Survival horror	Capcom	Capcom	Jan 26, 2017	Jan 24, 2017	Jan 24, 2017	P VR	
Resident Evil HD Remaster	Survival horror	Capcom	Capcom	Jan 20, 2015	Jan 20, 2015	Jan 20, 2015		
Resident Evil Zero HD Remaster	Survival horror	Capcom	Capcom	Jan 21, 2015	Jan 19, 2016	Jan 19, 2016		
Resident Evil: Revelations	Survival horror	Capcom	Capcom	Aug 31, 2017	Aug 29, 2017	Aug 29, 2017	P	
Resident Evil: Revelations 2	Survival horror	Capcom	Capcom	Feb 25, 2015	Feb 24, 2015	Feb 25, 2015		
Resident Evil Village	Survival horror	Capcom	Capcom	May 7, 2021	May 7, 2021	May 7, 2021		
Resogun	Shoot 'em up	Housemarque	Sony Computer Entertainment	Feb 22, 2014	Nov 15, 2013	Nov 29, 2013	P	
Resonance of Fate	Role-playing	Tri-Ace	Tri-Ace	Oct 18, 2018	Oct 18, 2018	Oct 18, 2018	P	
Retro City Rampage	Action-adventure	Vblank Entertainment	Vblank Entertainment	Unreleased	Nov 11, 2014	Nov 12, 2014		
Retro Machina	Real-time strategy	Orbit Studio	Super.com	Unreleased	May 12, 2021	May 12, 2021		
RetroMania Wrestling	Sports	RetroMania Studios	RetroMania Studios	Unreleased	Feb 26, 2021	Feb 26, 2021		
Retsnom	Puzzle	Somi	Somi	Jun 6, 2016	Jun 6, 2016	Jun 6, 2016	P	
Return of the Obra Dinn	Puzzle	Lucas Pope	3909	Oct 18, 2019	Oct 18, 2019	Oct 18, 2019		
Reus	God game, simulator	Abbey Games	Soedesco	Unreleased	Oct 11, 2016	Oct 14, 2016		
Revenge of the Savage Planet	Action-adventure	Raccoon Logic	Raccoon Logic	May 8, 2025	May 8, 2025	May 8, 2025		
Reverie	Role-playing	Rainbite	JP: EastAsiaSoft; WW: Rainbite	May 18, 2018	May 10, 2018	May 16, 2018		
Reverse Crawl	Turn-based tactics	Nerdook Productions	Digerati	Unreleased	May 7, 2019	May 8, 2019		
Re:Zero -Starting Life in Another World-: Death or Kiss	Visual novel	5pb.	5pb.	Mar 30, 2017	Unreleased	Unreleased		
Re:Zero -Starting Life in Another World-: The Prophecy of the Throne	Visual novel; tactical role-playing	Chime	Spike Chunsoft	Jan 28, 2021	Jan 29, 2021	Feb 5, 2021		
Rewrite	Visual novel	Key	Prototype	Mar 23, 2017	Unreleased	Unreleased		
Reynatis	Action role-playing	Natsume Atari; FuRyu	JP: FuRyu; WW: NIS America	Jul 25, 2024	Sep 27, 2024	Sep 27, 2024		
Rez Infinite	Shooter	Enhance Games	Enhance Games	Oct 13, 2016	Oct 13, 2016	Oct 13, 2016	P VR	
Rico	First-person shooter	Ground Shatter	Ground Shatter	Mar 14, 2019	Mar 12, 2019	Mar 12, 2019		
Rico: London	First-person shooter	Ground Shatter	Aksys Games; Numskull Games	Dec 9, 2021	Dec 9, 2021	Dec 9, 2021		
Riddled Corpses EX	Twin stick shooter	CowCat	CowCat	Unreleased	Jun 5, 2018	Jun 5, 2018		
Ride	Racing	Milestone srl	Milestone srl	Jun 25, 2015	Oct 6, 2015	Mar 20, 2015		
Ride 2	Racing	Milestone srl	Milestone srl	Feb 14, 2017	Feb 14, 2017	Feb 14, 2017	P	
Ride 3	Racing	Milestone srl	Milestone srl	Feb 28, 2019	Nov 30, 2018	Nov 30, 2018	P	
Ride 4	Racing	Milestone srl	Bandai Namco Entertainment	Nov 22, 2020	Oct 8, 2020	Oct 8, 2020	P	
Riders Republic	Extreme sports	Ubisoft Annecy	Ubisoft	Oct 28, 2021	Oct 28, 2021	Oct 28, 2021	CB	
The Riftbreaker	Shooter; strategy; tower defense	Exor Studios	Exor Studios	TBA	TBA	TBA		
RiftStar Raiders	Shoot 'em up	Climax Studios	Climax Studios	Feb 27, 2018	Feb 27, 2018	Feb 27, 2018		
Rigid Force Redux	Shoot 'em up	com8com1	Headup Games	Unreleased	Dec 23, 2020	Dec 23, 2020	P	
Rime	Adventure	Tequila Works	Grey Box / Six Foot	May 26, 2017	May 26, 2017	May 26, 2017	P	
RiMS Racing	Racing	RaceWard Studio	Nacon	Aug 19, 2021	Aug 19, 2021	Aug 19, 2021		
Riptide GP: Renegade	Racing	Vector Unit	Vector Unit	Unreleased	Jul 26, 2016	Jul 26, 2016		
Riptide GP2	Racing	Vector Unit	Vector Unit	Unreleased	Jun 23, 2015	Jun 23, 2015		
Rise & Shine	Action-adventure	Super Awesome	Adult Swim Games	Unreleased	Apr 18, 2017	Apr 18, 2017		
Rise of the Tomb Raider	Action-adventure	Crystal Dynamics	Square Enix	Oct 13, 2016	Oct 11, 2016	Oct 11, 2016	P VR	
Rise of the Triad Remastered	First-person shooter	Apogee Software; Destructive Creations	3D Realms	Unreleased	TBA	TBA		
Risen 3: Titan Lords Enhanced Edition	Action role-playing	Piranha Bytes	Deep Silver	Aug 21, 2015	Aug 21, 2015	Aug 21, 2015		
Risk	Card & board	Zoe Mode	Ubisoft	Unreleased	Feb 3, 2015	Feb 3, 2015		
Risk: Urban Assault	Card & board	Zoe Mode	Ubisoft	Unreleased	Aug 2, 2016	Aug 2, 2016		
Risk of Rain	Platform; roguelike	Hopoo Games	Code Mystics	Apr 12, 2016	Apr 12, 2016	Apr 12, 2016	CP	
Risk of Rain 2	Third-person shooter; roguelike	Hopoo Games	Gearbox Publishing	Sep 2, 2019	Aug 30, 2019	Aug 30, 2019		
Ritual: Crown of Horns	Top-down shooter	WFH Games	WFH Games	Unreleased	Feb 28, 2020	Feb 28, 2020		
Rive	Shoot 'em up	Two Tribes B.V.	Two Tribes B.V.	Jan 20, 2017	Sep 13, 2016	Sep 13, 2016	P	
Riverbond	Action role-playing	Cococucumber	Cococucumber	Dec 10, 2019	Jun 9, 2019	Jun 17, 2019	P	
Roblox	All	Roblox Corporation	Roblox Corporation	Oct 10, 2023	Oct 10, 2023	Oct 10, 2023		
River City Girls	Beat 'em up	WayForward	WayForward	Sep 5, 2019	Sep 5, 2019	Sep 5, 2019		
River City Melee: Battle Royal Special	Fighting	Arc System Works	H2 Interactive	Dec 26, 2016	Apr 28, 2017	May 10, 2017		
River City Melee Mach!!	Fighting	Arc System Works	Arc System Works	Oct 10, 2019	Oct 10, 2019	Oct 18, 2019		
Road 96	Adventure	DigixArt	DigixArt	Apr 14, 2022	Apr 14, 2022	Apr 14, 2022		
Road Not Taken	Puzzle, roguelike	Spry Fox	Spry Fox	Aug 6, 2014	Aug 6, 2014	Aug 6, 2014		
Road Rage	Vehicular combat	Maximum Games	Maximum Games	Nov 14, 2017	Nov 14, 2017	Nov 14, 2017		
Road Redemption	Vehicular combat	EQ-Games	Tripwire Interactive	Nov 6, 2018	Nov 6, 2018	Nov 6, 2018		
Road to Ballhalla	Action-puzzler; rhythm-based	Torched Hill	tinyBuild	Unreleased	Aug 1, 2018	Aug 1, 2018		
Road To Guangdong	Simulation	Just Add Oil Games	Excalibur Publishing Limited	Aug 29, 2020	Aug 29, 2020	Aug 29, 2020		
Robbie Swifthand and the Orb of Mysteries	Platform	Pixel Reign	Pixel Reign	Jul 24, 2019	Jul 23, 2019	Unreleased		
Robonauts	Action	QubicGames	QubicGames	Unreleased	Sep 19, 2017	Sep 19, 2017		
Robotics;Notes Dash	Visual novel	5pb.	JP: 5pb.; WW: Spike Chunsoft	Jan 31, 2019	Oct 13, 2020	Oct 16, 2020		
Robotics;Notes Elite	Visual novel	5pb.	JP: 5pb.; WW: Spike Chunsoft	Jan 31, 2019	Oct 13, 2020	Oct 16, 2020		
Rock Band 4	Rhythm	Harmonix	Harmonix	Oct 6, 2015	Oct 6, 2015	Oct 6, 2015		
Rock Boshers DX	Puzzle, Shooter	Tikipod	Tikipod	Unreleased	Sep 9, 2014	Sep 10, 2014		
Rock'N Racing Off Road DX	Racing	Unfinished Pixel	Unfinished Pixel	Unreleased	Nov 16, 2016	Nov 16, 2016		
Rock of Ages 2: Bigger & Boulder	Tower defense; racing	Ace Team	Atlus	Unreleased	Aug 28, 2017	Aug 29, 2017		
Rock of Ages III: Make & Break	Tower defense; racing	Ace Team; Giant Monkey Robot	Modus Games	Aug 20, 2020	Jul 21, 2020	Jul 21, 2020		
Rocket Arena	Third-person shooter	Final Strike Games	Electronic Arts	Jul 14, 2020	Jul 14, 2020	Jul 14, 2020		
Rocket League	Sports	Psyonix	Psyonix	Jul 7, 2015	Jul 7, 2015	Jul 7, 2015		
Rocketbirds 2: Evolution	Adventure; platform	Ratloop Asia	Ratloop	Apr 26, 2016	Apr 26, 2016	Apr 26, 2016	3D	
Rockets Rockets Rockets	Shooter	Radial Games	Radial Games	Jan 15, 2019	Aug 30, 2016	Sep 6, 2016		
Rocksmith 2014	Music	Red Storm Entertainment	Ubisoft	Unreleased	Nov 4, 2014	Nov 7, 2014		
Rogue Aces	Shoot 'em up	Infinite State Games	Infinite State Games	Apr 12, 2018	Apr 12, 2018	Apr 12, 2018		
Roguebook	Roguelike deck-building	Abrakam Entertainment	Nacon	Feb 24, 2022	Feb 24, 2022	Feb 24, 2022		
Rogue Legacy	Platform; roguelike	Cellar Door Games	Cellar Door Games	Apr 8, 2015	Jul 29, 2014	Jul 30, 2014		
Rogue Legacy 2	Platform; roguelike	Cellar Door Games	Cellar Door Games	Jun 20, 2023	Jun 20, 2023	Jun 20, 2023		
Rogue Stormers	Action; run and gun	Black Forest Games	Black Forest Games	Unreleased	Oct 4, 2016	Oct 5, 2016		
Rollers of the Realm	Pinball	Phantom Compass	Atlus	Jul 29, 2015	Nov 26, 2014	Nov 26, 2014		
Romancelvania: BATchelor's Curse	Metroidvania	Deep End Games	Deep End Games	TBA	TBA	TBA		
Romance of the Three Kingdoms XIII	Turn-based strategy	Koei	Tecmo Koei	Dec 10, 2015	Jul 5, 2016	Aug 5, 2016	P	
Romance of the Three Kingdoms XIV	Turn-based strategy	Koei Tecmo	Koei Tecmo	Jan 16, 2020	Feb 28, 2020	Feb 28, 2020		
Romancing SaGa 2	Role-playing	ArtePiazza	Square Enix	Dec 15, 2017	Dec 15, 2017	Dec 15, 2017		
Romancing SaGa 2: Revenge of the Seven	Role-playing	Square Enix; xeen Inc.	Square Enix	Oct 24, 2024	Oct 24, 2024	Oct 24, 2024		
Romancing SaGa 3	Role-playing	Square Enix	Square Enix	Nov 11, 2019	Nov 11, 2019	Nov 11, 2019		
Ronin	Action; platform	Tomasz Wacławek	Devolver Digital	Nov 1, 2016	Nov 1, 2016	Nov 1, 2016		
Rookie Boxing	Fighting	Pix Arts	Pix Arts	Oct 25, 2024	Oct 25, 2024	Oct 25, 2024		
Root Film	Adventure; visual novel	Kadokawa Games	JP: Kadokawa Games; WW: PQube	Jul 30, 2020	Mar 19, 2021	Mar 19, 2021		
Root Letter	Adventure; visual novel	Kadokawa Games	JP: Kadokawa Games; WW: PQube	Jun 16, 2016	Nov 10, 2016	Oct 28, 2016		
Root Letter: Last Answer	Visual novel	Kadokawa Games	Kadokawa Games	Dec 20, 2018	Sep 3, 2019	Aug 30, 2019		
Roots of Pacha	Role-playing; farming simulation	Soda Den	Crytivo	Nov 29, 2023	Nov 29, 2023	Nov 29, 2023		
Rory McIlroy PGA Tour	Sports	EA Tiburon	EA Sports	Unreleased	Jul 14, 2015	Jun 16, 2015		
Roundabout	Driving	No Goblin	No Goblin	Unreleased	Mar 27, 2015	Mar 27, 2015		
Roundguard	Puzzle	Quantum Astrophysicists Guild	Quantum Astrophysicists Guild	Unreleased	Mar 17, 2020	Mar 25, 2020		
Royal Assault	Strategy	Bionic Pony	Bionic Pony	Unreleased	Jan 31, 2019	Unreleased		
RPGolf Legends	Role-playing; sports	ArcticNet	Kemco	Jan 20, 2022	Unreleased	Unreleased		
RPG Maker MV	Role-playing	Kadokawa Games	Kadokawa Games	Nov 15, 2018	Sep 8, 2020	Sep 11, 2020		
Rugby 15	Sports	HB Studios	Bigben Interactive	Unreleased	Feb 24, 2015	Nov 21, 2014		
Rugby 18	Sports	EKO Software	Bigben Interactive	Unreleased	Oct 31, 2017	Oct 31, 2017		
Rugby 20	Sports	Bigben Interactive	Bigben Interactive	Feb 26, 2020	Jan 23, 2020	Jan 23, 2020		
Rugby Challenge 3	Sports	Wicked Witch Software	Tru Blu Entertainment	Jun 24, 2016	Jun 24, 2016	Jun 24, 2016		
Rugby Challenge 4	Sports	Wicked Witch Software	Home Entertainment Suppliers	Aug 8, 2020	Jul 16, 2020	Jul 16, 2020		
Rugby League Live 3	Sports	Big Ant Studios	Tru Blu	Unreleased	May 17, 2016	Sep 17, 2015		
Rugby League Live 4	Sports	Big Ant Studios	Home Entertainment	Aug 28, 2017	Aug 28, 2017	Aug 28, 2017		
Ruined King: A League of Legends Story	Role-playing	Airship Syndicate	Riot Forge	Nov 16, 2021	Nov 16, 2021	Nov 16, 2021		
Ruiner	Shooter	Reikon Games	Devolver Digital	Sep 26, 2017	Sep 26, 2017	Sep 26, 2017		
Ruinverse	Role-playing	Kemco	Kemco	Dec 4, 2020	Unreleased	Unreleased		
Runbow	Platform	13AM Games	13AM Games	Dec 13, 2018	Jul 3, 2018	Jul 3, 2018		
Runner2: Future Legend of Rhythm Alien	Platform	Choice Provisions	Choice Provisions	Feb 24, 2016	Feb 24, 2016	Feb 24, 2016		
Runner3	Platform	Choice Provisions	Choice Provisions	Nov 13, 2018	Nov 13, 2018	Nov 13, 2018		
Rush Rover	Shoot 'em up; roguelike	Radio	Ratalaika Games	Unreleased	Apr 7, 2020	Apr 8, 2020		
Rust	Action-adventure; survival	Facepunch Studios	Double Eleven	Jun 24, 2021	May 21, 2021	May 21, 2021		
RWBY: Grimm Eclipse	Hack and slash	Rooster Teeth	Rooster Teeth	Jan 17, 2017	Jan 17, 2017	Jan 17, 2017		
The Ryuo's Work Is Never Done!	Visual novel	Entergram	Entergram	Dec 17, 2020	Unreleased	Unreleased		
Sackboy: A Big Adventure	Platform; puzzle	Sumo Digital	Sony Interactive Entertainment	Nov 12, 2020	Nov 12, 2020	Nov 19, 2020	CB CP	
SaGa: Scarlet Grace - Ambitions	Role-playing	Square Enix	Square Enix	Aug 2, 2018	Dec 3, 2019	Dec 3, 2019		
SaGa Frontier Remastered	Role-playing	Square Enix	Square Enix	Apr 15, 2021	Apr 15, 2021	Apr 15, 2021		
Sagebrush	Adventure	Redact Games	Ratalaika Games	Unreleased	Aug 6, 2019	Aug 7, 2019		
Saint Seiya: Soldiers' Soul	Fighting	Bandai Namco	Bandai Namco	Sep 25, 2015	Oct 6, 2015	Sep 25, 2015		
Saints Row: Gat out of Hell	Action-adventure	Volition	Deep Silver	Apr 14, 2015	Jan 20, 2015	Jan 23, 2015		
Saints Row IV: Re-Elected	Action-adventure	Volition	Deep Silver	Apr 16, 2015	Jan 27, 2015	Jan 27, 2015		
Saints Row: The Third Remastered	Action-adventure	Volition	Deep Silver	Oct 28, 2020	May 22, 2020	May 22, 2020		
Sakuna: Of Rice and Ruin	Simulation; action	Edelweiss	Xseed Games	Nov 12, 2020	Nov 10, 2020	Nov 20, 2020	P	
Salt and Sanctuary	Action role-playing	Ska Studios	Ska Studios	Mar 15, 2016	Mar 15, 2016	Mar 15, 2016		
Sam & Max Beyond Time and Space Remastered	Adventure	Skunkape Games	Skunkape Games	Unreleased	Sep 29, 2022	Sep 29, 2022		
Sam & Max Save the World Remastered	Adventure	Skunkape Games	Skunkape Games	Unreleased	Sep 29, 2022	Sep 29, 2022		
Sam & Max: The Devil's Playhouse Remastered	Adventure	Skunkape Games	Skunkape Games	Unreleased	Aug 14, 2024	Aug 14, 2024		
Samurai Aces	Shoot 'em up	Zerodiv	City Connection	Jul 27, 2022	Jul 27, 2022	Jul 27, 2022		
Samurai Aces II: Sengoku Blade	Shoot 'em up	Zerodiv	City Connection	Aug 3, 2022	Aug 3, 2022	Aug 3, 2022		
Samurai Aces III: Sengoku Cannon	Shoot 'em up	Zerodiv	City Connection	Jul 27, 2022	Jul 27, 2022	Jul 27, 2022		
Samurai Jack: Battle Through Time	Action; fighting	Soleil	JP: DMM Games; WW: Adult Swim Games	Jan 21, 2021	Aug 21, 2020	Aug 21, 2020		
Samurai Shodown	Fighting	SNK	Athlon Games	Jun 27, 2019	Jun 25, 2019	Jun 25, 2019		
Samurai Shodown NeoGeo Collection	Fighting	Digital Eclipse	SNK	Jul 30, 2020	Jul 28, 2020	Jul 28, 2020		
Samurai Warriors 4	Hack and slash	Omega Force	Koei Tecmo	Sep 21, 2014	Oct 21, 2014	Oct 24, 2014		
Samurai Warriors 4 II	Hack and slash	Omega Force	Koei Tecmo	Feb 11, 2015	Feb 11, 2015	Feb 11, 2015		
Samurai Warriors 4: Empires	Hack and slash	Omega Force	Koei Tecmo	Sep 17, 2015	Sep 17, 2015	Sep 17, 2015		
Samurai Warriors: Spirit of Sanada	Hack and slash	Omega Force	Koei Tecmo	Nov 23, 2016	May 23, 2017	May 26, 2017		
Samurai Warriors 5	Hack and slash	Omega Force	Koei Tecmo	Jun 24, 2021	Jul 27, 2021	Jul 27, 2021		
Save Me Mr Tako	Platform; action role-playing	Deneos Games	Limited Run Games	May 3, 2021	May 3, 2021	May 3, 2021		
Sayonara Wild Hearts	Music	Simogo	Annapurna Interactive	Sep 20, 2019	Sep 19, 2019	Sep 19, 2019		
Scar-Lead Salvation	Third-person shooter	Compile Heart; Neilo	Compile Heart; Idea Factory International	May 29, 2025	May 29, 2025	May 29, 2025		
Scarlet Nexus	Action role-playing	Bandai Namco Entertainment	Bandai Namco Entertainment	Jun 25, 2021	Jun 25, 2021	Jun 25, 2021		
Scarlett Mysteries: Cursed Child	Puzzle; hidden object	Artifex Mundi	Artifex Mundi	Unreleased	Nov 12, 2019	Nov 12, 2019		
The School: Swan Song	Survival horror	Roi Games	Roi Games	TBA	TBA	TBA	VR	
Score Rush Extended	Shooter	Xona Games	Xona Games	Unreleased	May 31, 2016	Jun 2, 2016		
Scott Pilgrim vs. the World: The Game - Complete Edition	Beat 'em up	Engine Software	Ubisoft	Jan 14, 2021	Jan 14, 2021	Jan 14, 2021		
ScourgeBringer	Roguelike; platformer	Flying Oak Games	Dear Villagers	Unreleased	Apr 22, 2021	Apr 22, 2021		
Scrabble	Board game	Ubisoft	Ubisoft	Unreleased	Jun 30, 2015	Jun 30, 2015		
Scram Kitty DX	Platform; shooter	Dakko Dakko	Dakko Dakko	Unreleased	Mar 10, 2015	Feb 25, 2015		
Screencheat	First-person shooter	Samurai Punk	Samurai Punk	Sep 29, 2016	Mar 1, 2016	Mar 1, 2016		
SD Gundam Battle Alliance	Strategy; role-playing	Bandai Namco Entertainment	Bandai Namco Entertainment	Aug 25, 2022	Aug 25, 2022	Aug 25, 2022		
SD Gundam G Generation Cross Rays	Strategy; role-playing	Bandai Namco Entertainment	Bandai Namco Entertainment	Nov 28, 2019	Unreleased	Unreleased		
SD Gundam G Generation Genesis	Strategy; role-playing	Bandai Namco Entertainment	Bandai Namco Entertainment	Nov 22, 2016	Unreleased	Unreleased		
Sea of Solitude	Adventure	Jo-Mei Games	Electronic Arts	Jul 5, 2019	Jul 5, 2019	Jul 5, 2019		
Seasons After Fall	Platform; puzzle	Swing Swing Submarine	Focus Home Interactive	Jan 24, 2019	May 16, 2017	May 16, 2017		
Sébastien Loeb Rally Evo	Racing	Milestone srl	Milestone srl	Mar 17, 2016	Jan 29, 2016	Jan 29, 2016		
Secret of Mana	Action role-playing	Square Enix	Square Enix	Feb 15, 2018	Feb 15, 2018	Feb 15, 2018	P	
The Secret Order: Return to the Buried Kingdom	Puzzle; hidden object	Artifex Mundi	Artifex Mundi	Unreleased	Sep 18, 2020	Sep 18, 2020		
The Secret Order: Shadow Breach	Puzzle; hidden object	Artifex Mundi	Artifex Mundi	Unreleased	Mar 17, 2020	Mar 17, 2020		
Secret Ponchos	Fighting, shooter	Switchblade Monkeys	Switchblade Monkeys	Dec 11, 2014	Dec 2, 2014	Dec 3, 2014		
Sega Genesis Classics	Action; platform	Sega	Sega	Unreleased	May 29, 2018	May 29, 2018		
Sekiro: Shadows Die Twice	Action-adventure	FromSoftware	Activision	Mar 22, 2019	Mar 22, 2019	Mar 22, 2019		
Semispheres	Puzzle	Vivid Helix	Vivid Helix	Feb 24, 2017	Feb 14, 2017	Feb 14, 2017		
Sengoku Basara 4	Hack and slash	Capcom	Capcom	Jul 23, 2015	Unreleased	Unreleased		
Senko no Ronde 2	Fighting, shooter	Kadokawa; G.rev	Degica	Sep 7, 2017	Sep 7, 2017	Sep 7, 2017		
Senran Kagura: Estival Versus	Action	Tamsoft	Xseed Games	Mar 26, 2015	Mar 15, 2016	Mar 18, 2016		
Senran Kagura: Peach Beach Splash	Action	Tamsoft	Xseed Games	Mar 16, 2017	Sep 26, 2017	Sep 26, 2017	VR	
Senran Kagura Burst Re:Newal	Action	Tamsoft	Xseed Games	Feb 22, 2018	Jan 18, 2019	Jan 22, 2019		
Senri no Kifu: Gendai Shougi Mystery	Adventure	Kemco	Kemco	Feb 27, 2020	Unreleased	Unreleased		
Sephirothic Stories	Role-playing, puzzle	Exe Create	Kemco	Unreleased	Apr 2, 2019	Apr 17, 2019		
Sephonie	Puzzle-platform	Analgesic Productions	Ratalaika Games	Jul 21, 2023	Jul 21, 2023	Jul 21, 2023		
Seraph	Run and gun	Dreadbit Games	Dreadbit Games	Unreleased	Nov 1, 2016	Nov 1, 2016		
Seraphim	Shooter	Studio Ravenheart	Studio Ravenheart	TBA	TBA	TBA		
Serial Cleaner	Action; stealth	iFun4all	Curve Digital	Unreleased	Jul 11, 2017	Jul 11, 2017		
Serious Sam 4	First-person shooter	Croteam	Devolver Digital	Dec 7, 2021	Dec 7, 2021	Dec 7, 2021		
Serious Sam Collection	First-person shooter	Croteam	Devolver Digital	Unreleased	Nov 17, 2020	Nov 17, 2020		
Seum: Speedrunners from Hell	Platform; parkour	Pine Studio	Headup Games	Unreleased	Mar 8, 2018	Feb 22, 2018		
The Seven Deadly Sins: Knights of Britannia	Fantasy	Bandai Namco Entertainment	Bandai Namco Entertainment	Jan 25, 2018	Feb 9, 2018	Feb 9, 2018		
The Sexy Brutale	Adventure; puzzle	Cavalier Games	Tequila Works	Apr 12, 2017	Apr 12, 2017	Apr 12, 2017		
Shadow Complex Remastered	Platform-adventure	Chair Entertainment; Epic Games	Epic Games	May 3, 2016	Aug 19, 2016	May 3, 2016		
Shadow Corridor	Horror	Regista	Regista	Dec 25, 2019	Unreleased	Unreleased		
Shadowgate	Point-and-click adventure	Zojoi	Abstraction Games	Unreleased	Apr 11, 2019	Apr 11, 2019		
Shadow Man Remastered	Action-adventure	Nightdive Studios	Nightdive Studios	Unreleased	Jan 12, 2022	Jan 12, 2022		
Shadow of the Beast	Action	Heavy Spectrum	Sony Computer Entertainment	May 19, 2016	May 17, 2016	May 17, 2016	VR	
Shadow of the Colossus	Action-adventure	Japan Studio	Sony Interactive Entertainment	Feb 6, 2018	Feb 6, 2018	Feb 6, 2018	P	
Shadow of the Tomb Raider	Action-adventure	Crystal Dynamics	Square Enix	Sep 14, 2018	Sep 14, 2018	Sep 14, 2018	P	
Shadow Tactics: Blades of the Shogun	Real-time tactics	Mimimi Productions	Daedalic Entertainment	Nov 18, 2020	Aug 1, 2017	Aug 1, 2017	P	
Shadow Warrior	First-person shooter	Flying Wild Hog	Devolver Digital	Unreleased	Oct 21, 2014	Oct 24, 2014		
Shadow Warrior 2	First-person shooter	Flying Wild Hog	Devolver Digital	Unreleased	May 19, 2017	May 19, 2017		
Shadow Warrior 3	First-person shooter	Flying Wild Hog	Devolver Digital	Mar 1, 2022	Mar 1, 2022	Mar 1, 2022		
Shadows: Awakening	Action; hack and slash	Games Farm	Kalypso Media	Jan 18, 2019	Sep 4, 2018	Aug 31, 2018		
Shady Part of Me	Puzzle-platform	Douze Dixiemes	Focus Home Interactive	Dec 10, 2020	Dec 10, 2020	Dec 10, 2020		
Shakedown: Hawaii	Action-adventure	Vblank Entertainment	Vblank Entertainment	Unreleased	May 7, 2019	May 7, 2019	CB	
Shantae	Action; platform	WayForward Technologies	WayForward Technologies	Unreleased	Jun 2, 2023	Jun 2, 2023		
Shantae: Half-Genie Hero	Action; platform	WayForward Technologies	WayForward Technologies	Dec 20, 2016	Dec 20, 2016	Dec 20, 2016		
Shantae: Risky's Revenge	Action; platform	WayForward Technologies	WayForward Technologies	Aug 31, 2015	Jun 23, 2015	Dec 8, 2015		
Shantae Advance: Risky Revolution	Action; platform	WayForward Technologies	WayForward Technologies	Unreleased	Aug 19, 2025	Aug 19, 2025		
Shantae and the Pirate's Curse	Action; platform	WayForward Technologies	WayForward Technologies	Sep 7, 2016	Apr 19, 2016	Apr 20, 2016		
Shantae and the Seven Sirens	Action; platform	WayForward Technologies	WayForward Technologies	May 28, 2020	May 28, 2020	May 28, 2020		
Shape of the World	Adventure; art	Hollow Tree Games	Plug In Digital	Unreleased	Jun 5, 2018	Jun 5, 2018		
Shaq Fu: A Legend Reborn	Beat 'em up	Saber Interactive	Wire Productions	Jun 5, 2018	Jun 5, 2018	Jun 5, 2018		
Shattered – Tale of the Forgotten King	Action role-playing	Redlock Studio	Forthright Entertainment	Unknown	Apr 22, 2022	Apr 22, 2022		
Sheltered	Strategy	Unicube	Team17	Unreleased	Mar 15, 2016	Mar 15, 2016	3D	
ShellShock Live	Artillery; strategy; turn-based	kChamp Games	kChamp Games	Unreleased	Sep 13, 2019	Feb 28, 2020		
Shenmue I & II	Action-adventure	D3T	Sega	Nov 22, 2018	Aug 21, 2018	Aug 21, 2018		
Shenmue III	Action-adventure	Ys Net	Deep Silver	Nov 19, 2019	Nov 19, 2019	Nov 19, 2019		
Sherlock Holmes: The Awakened	Adventure	Frogwares	Frogwares	Apr 11, 2023	Apr 11, 2023	Apr 11, 2023		
Sherlock Holmes: Chapter One	Adventure	Frogwares	Focus Home Interactive	Apr 28, 2022	Apr 28, 2022	Apr 28, 2022		
Sherlock Holmes: Crimes & Punishments	Adventure	Frogwares	Focus Home Interactive	Mar 3, 2020	Sep 30, 2014	Oct 3, 2014		
Sherlock Holmes: The Devil's Daughter	Adventure	Frogwares	Focus Home Interactive	Oct 25, 2016	Oct 25, 2016	Oct 25, 2016		
Shift Happens	Platform; puzzle	Klonk Games	Klonk Games	Mar 7, 2017	Mar 7, 2017	Mar 7, 2017		
Shiftlings	Platform	Rock Pocket Games	Rock Pocket Games	Unreleased	Mar 3, 2015	Mar 11, 2015		
Shikabanegurai no Boukenmeshi	Tactical role-playing	Nippon Ichi Software	Nippon Ichi Software	Jan 27, 2022	Unreleased	Unreleased		
Shikhondo: Soul Eater	Shoot 'em up	DeerFarm	Digerati Distribution	Jun 22, 2018	Aug 28, 2018	Aug 29, 2018		
Shin Megami Tensei III: Nocturne HD Remaster	Role-playing	Atlus	Atlus	Oct 29, 2020	May 25, 2021	May 25, 2021		
Shiness: The Lightning Kingdom	Action role-playing	Enigami	Focus Home Interactive	Unreleased	Apr 18, 2017	Apr 18, 2017		
Shing!	Action; roguelike	Mass Creation	Mass Creation	Jan 21, 2021	Aug 27, 2020	Aug 28, 2020		
Shining Resonance Refrain	Role-playing	O-Two	Sega	Mar 29, 2018	Jul 10, 2018	Jul 10, 2018		
Shiny Ski Resort	Simulation	Kairosoft	Kairosoft	Dec 23, 2020	Dec 24, 2020	Dec 24, 2020		
Shoppe Keep	Action role-playing, Simulation	Arvydas Zemaitis	Excalibur	Unreleased	Sep 19, 2017	Sep 19, 2017		
Shovel Knight	Action; platform	Yacht Club Games	Yacht Club Games	Apr 21, 2015	Apr 21, 2015	Apr 21, 2015		
Shovel Knight: Pocket Dungeon	Adventure; puzzle	Yacht Club Games; Vine	Yacht Club Games	Dec 13, 2021	Dec 13, 2021	Dec 13, 2021		
Showa American Story	Action role-playing	Nekcom	2P Games	TBA	TBA	TBA		
Shu	Platform	Coatsink Software	Coatsink Software	Jun 15, 2017	Oct 4, 2016	Oct 4, 2016		
Siegecraft Commander	Strategy; tower defense	Blowfish Studios	Blowfish Studios	Unreleased	Jan 17, 2017	Jan 17, 2017	CP	
Sifu	Beat 'em up	Sloclap	Sloclap	Feb 22, 2022	Feb 22, 2022	Feb 22, 2022		
Silence: The Whispered World 2	Point-and-click adventure	Daedalic Entertainment	Daedalic Entertainment	Jun 21, 2018	Nov 15, 2016	Nov 15, 2016		
The Silver Case	Visual novel	Grasshopper Manufacture; Active Gaming Media	NIS America	Mar 15, 2018	Apr 18, 2017	Apr 21, 2017	P	
The Sims 4	Simulation	Maxis	Electronic Arts	Nov 17, 2017	Nov 17, 2017	Nov 17, 2017		
Simulacra	Full motion video	Kaigan Games	Wales Interactive	Unreleased	Dec 3, 2019	Dec 3, 2019		
Sine Mora EX	Shoot 'em up	Digital Reality	JP: Handy Games; WW: THQ Nordic	Mar 26, 2020	Aug 8, 2017	Aug 8, 2017	P	
SingStar Celebration	Music & rhythm, party	London Studio	Sony Interactive Entertainment	Unreleased	Oct 24, 2017	Nov 22, 2017	C PL	
SingStar: Ultimate Party	Music & rhythm, party	London Studio	Sony Interactive Entertainment	Unreleased	Unreleased	Oct 24, 2014		
The Sinking City	Action-adventure; survival horror	Frogwares	Bigben Interactive	Jun 27, 2019	Jun 27, 2019	Jun 27, 2019		
Sinner: Sacrifice for Redemption	Role-playing	Dark Star	Another Indie	Apr 25, 2018	Apr 25, 2018	Apr 25, 2018	P	
Siralim	Turn-based, role-playing	Thylacine Studios	Thylacine Studios	Unreleased	Feb 9, 2016	Mar 2, 2016		
Siralim 2	Turn-based, role-playing	Thylacine Studios	Thylacine Studios	Unreleased	Mar 14, 2017	Mar 14, 2017		
Siralim 3	Turn-based, role-playing	Thylacine Studios	Thylacine Studios	Unreleased	Mar 29, 2019	Unreleased		
Sisters Royale	Shoot 'em up	Alfa System	Chorus Worldwide	Jan 30, 2020	Jan 30, 2020	Jan 30, 2020		
Skate City	Sports	Agens	Snowman	Unreleased	May 6, 2021	May 6, 2021		
Skater XL	Sports; simulation	Easy Day Studios	Easy Day Studios	Unreleased	Jul 28, 2020	Jul 28, 2020		
Skul: The Hero Slayer	Platform	SouthPaw Games	Neowiz	Oct 20, 2021	Oct 21, 2021	Oct 21, 2021		
Skullgirls: 2nd Encore	Fighting	Lab Zero Games	Autumn Games	Apr 14, 2016	Jul 7, 2015	Jul 23, 2015	CP	
Skulls of the Shogun: Bone-A-Fide Edition	Turn-based strategy	17-Bit	17-Bit	Apr 6, 2016	Jun 2, 2015	Jun 3, 2015		
Sky: Children of the Light	Adventure; art game	Thatgamecompany	Thatgamecompany	Dec 6, 2022	Dec 6, 2022	Dec 6, 2022	CP	
Sky Force Anniversary	Shoot 'em up	Infinite Dreams	Infinite Dreams	Unreleased	Sep 6, 2016	Sep 7, 2016		
Sky Force Reloaded	Shoot 'em up	Infinite Dreams	Infinite Dreams	Mar 3, 2020	Dec 1, 2017	Dec 1, 2017		
Skylanders: Imaginators	Platform	Toys For Bob	Activision	Unreleased	Jun 17, 2016	Oct 14, 2016		
Skylanders: SuperChargers	Platform	Vicarious Visions	Activision	Unreleased	Sep 20, 2015	Sep 25, 2015		
Skylanders: Swap Force	Platform	Vicarious Visions	Activision	Unreleased	Nov 15, 2013	Nov 29, 2013		
Skylanders: Trap Team	Platform	Beenox	Activision	Unreleased	Oct 5, 2014	Oct 10, 2014		
SkyScrappers	2D fighter, platform	Ground Shatter	Ground Shatter	Unreleased	Nov 10, 2015	Oct 21, 2015		
SlabWell	Puzzle	Undercoders	JanduSoft	Unreleased	Oct 7, 2019	Oct 4, 2019		
Slain: Back from Hell	Hack and slash; platform	Wolfbrew Games	Digerati	May 26, 2017	Sep 20, 2016	Dec 5, 2016		
Slayaway Camp: Butcher's Cut	Horror; puzzle	Blue Wizard Digital	Digerati	Unreleased	Oct 24, 2017	Nov 1, 2017		
Slay the Spire	Roguelike deck-building	MegaCrit	Humble Bundle	Jun 18, 2019	May 21, 2019	May 21, 2019		
Sleeping Dogs: Definitive Edition	Action-adventure	United Front Games	Square Enix	Unreleased	Oct 14, 2014	Oct 10, 2014		
Slender: The Arrival	First-person survival horror	Blue Isle Studios; Parsec Productions	Midnight City	Unreleased	Mar 24, 2015	Mar 25, 2015		
Slitterhead	Survive horror; sealth	Bokeh Game Studio	Bokeh Game Studio	Nov 8, 2024	Nov 8, 2024	Nov 8, 2024		
Slime Rancher	Action-adventure	Monomi Park	Monomi Park	Unreleased	Aug 21, 2018	Aug 21, 2018	P	
Slime-san: Super Slime Edition	Platform	Fabraz	Headup Games	Jun 22, 2018	Jun 22, 2018	Jun 22, 2018		
Small Radios Big Televisions	Puzzle	Fire Face	Adult Swim Games	Unreleased	Nov 8, 2016	Nov 8, 2016		
Smelter	Action; platform; real-time strategy	X Plus	Dangen Entertainment	Apr 22, 2021	Apr 22, 2021	Apr 22, 2021		
SmuggleCraft	Adventure; racing	Happy Badger Studio	Happy Badger Studio	May 23, 2017	May 23, 2017	May 23, 2017		
The Smurfs: Mission Vileaf	Action-adventure	OSome Studio	Microids	Mar 13, 2022	Nov 16, 2021	Nov 5, 2021		
Snake Pass	Platform	Sumo Digital	Sumo Digital	Mar 29, 2017	Mar 29, 2017	Mar 29, 2017	P	
Snakeybus	Snake	Stovetop Studios	Digerati	Unreleased	Mar 31, 2020	Apr 1, 2020		
Sniper Ghost Warrior 3	Tactical Shooter; stealth	CI Games	CI Games	Apr 4, 2017	Apr 4, 2017	Apr 4, 2017		
Sniper Ghost Warrior Contracts	Tactical Shooter; stealth	CI Games	CI Games	Nov 22, 2019	Nov 22, 2019	Nov 22, 2019		
Sniper Ghost Warrior Contracts 2	Tactical Shooter; stealth	CI Games	CI Games	Aug 24, 2021	Aug 24, 2021	Aug 24, 2021		
Sniper Elite: Resistance	Tactical Shooter; Stealth	Rebellion Developments	Rebellion Developments	Jan 30, 2025	Jan 30, 2025	Jan 30, 2025		
Sniper Elite V2 Remastered	Tactical Shooter; Stealth	Rebellion Developments	Rebellion Developments	Dec 19, 2019	May 14, 2019	May 14, 2019	P	
Sniper Elite III	Tactical Shooter; Stealth	Rebellion Developments	505 Games	Jun 27, 2014	Jul 1, 2014	Jun 27, 2014	3D	
Sniper Elite 4	Tactical Shooter; Stealth	Rebellion Developments	Rebellion Developments	Nov 18, 2020	Feb 14, 2017	Feb 14, 2017	3D P	
Sniper Elite 5	Tactical Shooter; Stealth	Rebellion Developments	Rebellion Developments	May 26, 2022	May 26, 2022	May 26, 2022		
SNK 40th Anniversary Collection	Arcade	SNK / Digital Eclipse	NIS America	Unreleased	Mar 22, 2019	Mar 19, 2019		
Snooker 19	Sports	Lab42	Ripstone	Unreleased	Apr 16, 2019	Apr 17, 2019	P	
Snooker Nation Championship	Sports	Cherry Pop Games	Cherry Pop Games	Unreleased	Apr 16, 2019	Apr 17, 2019		
Snow Moto Racing Freedom	Racing	Zordix	Zordix	Unreleased	Apr 11, 2017	Apr 11, 2017		
SnowRunner	Simulation	Saber Interactive	Focus Home Interactive	Sep 10, 2020	Apr 28, 2020	Apr 28, 2020		
Sociable Soccer	Sports	Jon Hare	Combo-Breaker	TBA	TBA	TBA		
The Sojourn	Adventure; puzzle	Shifting Tides	Iceberg Interactive	Unreleased	Sep 20, 2019	Sep 20, 2019		
Solar Ash	Action-adventure	Heart Machine	Annapurna Interactive	Dec 2, 2021	Dec 2, 2021	Dec 2, 2021		
Soldam: Drop, Connect, Erase	Puzzle	City Connection	City Connection	Jul 25, 2019	Unreleased	Unreleased		
Sol Cresta	Shoot 'em up	PlatinumGames	PlatinumGames	Feb 22, 2022	Feb 22, 2022	Feb 22, 2022		
Sol Divide	Shoot 'em up	Zerodiv	City Connection	Jun 29, 2022	Jun 29, 2022	Jun 29, 2022		
Söldner-X 2: Final Prototype	Shoot 'em up	SideQuest Studios	Eastasiasoft	Nov 3, 2020	Nov 4, 2020	Nov 4, 2020		
Solitaire	Card & board	Sanuk Games	Bigben Interactive	Unreleased	Oct 11, 2016	Oct 11, 2016		
The Solus Project	Adventure, survival	Teotl Studios	Grip Games	Unreleased	Sep 18, 2017	Sep 18, 2017	VR	
So Many Me	Platform; puzzle	Extend Int	Origo Games	Jul 20, 2017	Feb 6, 2017	Feb 14, 2017		
Soma	Survival horror	Frictional Games	Frictional Games	Unreleased	Sep 22, 2015	Sep 22, 2015		
Someday You'll Return	Psychological horror	CBE Software	CBE Software	Unreleased	May 5, 2020	May 5, 2020		
Songbird Symphony	Platform	Joysteak Studios	PQube	Unreleased	Jul 25, 2019	Jul 25, 2019		
Songbringer	Action role-playing	Wizard Fu Games	Double Eleven	Sep 5, 2017	Sep 5, 2017	Sep 5, 2017		
Song of the Deep	Metroidvania	Insomniac Games	Insomniac Games	Unreleased	Jul 12, 2016	Jul 12, 2016		
Song of Horror	Survival horror	Raiser Games	Raiser Games	Unreleased	May 28, 2021	May 28, 2021		
Sonic Colors: Ultimate	Platform	Blind Squirrel Games	Sega	Sep 9, 2021	Sep 7, 2021	Sep 7, 2021		
Sonic Forces	Platform	Sonic Team	Sega	Nov 9, 2017	Nov 7, 2017	Nov 7, 2017	P	
Sonic Frontiers	Platform	Sonic Team	Sega	Nov 8, 2022	Nov 8, 2022	Nov 8, 2022	CB	
Sonic Mania	Platform	PagodaWest Games; Headcannon	Sega	Aug 16, 2017	Aug 15, 2017	Aug 15, 2017	P	
Sonic Mania Plus	Platform	PagodaWest Games; Headcannon	Sega	Jul 19, 2018	Jul 17, 2018	Jul 17, 2018		
Sonic Origins	Platform	Sega; Headcannon	Sega	Jun 23, 2022	Jun 23, 2022	Jun 23, 2022	CB	
Sonic Origins Plus	Platform	Sonic Team	Sega	Jun 23, 2023	Jun 23, 2023	Jun 23, 2023		
Sonic Racing: CrossWorlds	Kart racing	Sonic Team	Sega	Sep 25, 2025	Sep 25, 2025	Sep 25, 2025		
Sonic Superstars	Platform	Arzest; Sonic Team	Sega	Oct 17, 2023	Oct 17, 2023	Oct 17, 2023		
Sonic X Shadows Generations	Platform	Sonic Team	Sega	Oct 25, 2024	Oct 25, 2024	Oct 25, 2024		
Sorcer Striker	Shoot 'em up	Eighting	M2	Nov 2, 2017	Unreleased	Unreleased		
Soul Axiom	Adventure, puzzle	Wales Interactive	Wales Interactive	Unreleased	Jun 7, 2016	Jun 7, 2016		
Soulcalibur VI	Fighting	Project Soul	Bandai Namco Entertainment	Oct 19, 2018	Oct 19, 2018	Oct 19, 2018		
Soul Hackers 2	Role-playing	Atlus	Atlus	Aug 25, 2022	Aug 26, 2022	Aug 26, 2022		
Soul Saga: Episode 1	Role-playing	Disastercake	Disastercake	TBA	TBA	TBA		
Sound Shapes	Music, platform	Queasy Games	Sony Computer Entertainment	Feb 22, 2014	Nov 15, 2013	Nov 29, 2013		
South Park: The Fractured but Whole	Role-playing	Ubisoft San Francisco	Ubisoft	Unreleased	Oct 17, 2017	Oct 17, 2017		
South Park: The Stick of Truth	Role-playing	Obsidian Entertainment	Ubisoft	Unreleased	Oct 17, 2017	Oct 17, 2017		
Spacebase Startopia	Business simulation	Realmforge Studios	Kalypso Media	Unreleased	Mar 25, 2021	Mar 25, 2021		
Space Crew	Real-time strategy	Runner Duck	Curve Digital	Unreleased	Oct 15, 2020	Oct 15, 2020		
Space Hulk: Ascension	Turn-based strategy	Full Control; HR Games	Funbox Media	Unreleased	Aug 31, 2016	Aug 26, 2016		
Space Hulk: Deathwing	First-person shooter	Streum On Studio	Focus Home Interactive	Unreleased	May 22, 2018	May 22, 2018		
Space Hulk: Tactics	Turn-based strategy	Cyanide	Focus Home Interactive	Unreleased	Oct 9, 2018	Oct 9, 2018	P	
Space Invaders Forever	Arcade; shoot 'em up	Taito	United Games Entertainment	Unreleased	Dec 11, 2020	Dec 11, 2020		
Spacejacked	Action; tower defense	Rotten Mage	Rotten Mage	Unreleased	Apr 26, 2018	Apr 26, 2018		
Spaceland	Turn-based; strategy	Tortuga Team	Ellada Games	Unreleased	Feb 14, 2020	Feb 14, 2020		
Sparkle Unleashed	Action; puzzle	10tons	10tons	Unreleased	Dec 16, 2020	Dec 16, 2020	CB	
Sparkle 2	Action; puzzle	10tons	10tons	Unreleased	Dec 21, 2020	Dec 21, 2020	CB	
Sparklite	Role-playing	Red Blue Games	Merge Games	Nov 15, 2019	Nov 14, 2019	Nov 14, 2019		
Speed Limit	Arcade	Gamechuck	Chorus Worldwide	Unreleased	Feb 16, 2021	Feb 16, 2021		
SpeedRunners	Platform, racing	tinyBuild	DoubleDutch Games	Unreleased	Jul 5, 2017	Jul 5, 2017		
SpellForce 3 Reforced	Real-time strategy; role-playing	Grimlore Games	THQ Nordic	Mar 8, 2022	Mar 8, 2022	Mar 8, 2022		
Spelunky	Platform; roguelike	Mossmouth	Mossmouth	Oct 23, 2014	Oct 7, 2014	Oct 8, 2014	CP	
Spelunky 2	Platform; roguelike	Mossmouth; BlitWorks	Mossmouth	Sep 15, 2020	Sep 15, 2020	Sep 15, 2020		
Marvel's Spider-Man	Action-adventure	Insomniac Games	Sony Interactive Entertainment	Sep 7, 2018	Sep 7, 2018	Sep 7, 2018	P	
Spider-Man: Miles Morales	Action-adventure	Insomniac Games	Sony Interactive Entertainment	Nov 12, 2020	Nov 19, 2020	Nov 12, 2020	CB P	
Spider: Rite of the Shrouded Moon	Puzzle	Tiger Style	Tiger Style	Unreleased	Aug 6, 2015	Aug 6, 2015		
Spider Solitaire F	Card game	Fly High Works	Fly High Works	Sep 5, 2019	Apr 16, 2020	Mar 30, 2020		
Spirit: Lucky's Big Adventure	Adventure	Outright Games	Outright Games	Jun 1, 2021	Jun 1, 2021	Jun 1, 2021		
Spiritfarer	Adventure	Thunder Lotus Games	Thunder Lotus Games	Unreleased	Aug 18, 2020	Aug 18, 2020		
Spintires: MudRunner	Simulation	Saber Interactive	Focus Home Interactive	Jul 26, 2018	Oct 31, 2017	Oct 31, 2017	P	
Spirit Hunter: Death Mark	Visual novel; horror	Experience	Aksys Games	Jan 18, 2018	Oct 31, 2018	Oct 31, 2018		
Spirit Hunter: NG	Visual novel; horror	Experience	Aksys Games	Feb 21, 2019	Oct 10, 2019	Oct 10, 2019		
Spirit Hunter: Death Mark II	Adventure	Experience	Experience	Dec 1, 2022	Unreleased	Unreleased		
Spirit of the North	Adventure	Infuse Studio	Infuse Studio	Aug 20, 2020	Nov 1, 2019	Nov 1, 2019		
Splasher	Action; platform	Splashteam	Splashteam	Nov 9, 2017	Sep 26, 2017	Sep 27, 2017		
Splitgate	First-person shooter	1047 Games	1047 Games	Jul 27, 2021	Jul 27, 2021	Jul 27, 2021		
Splitgate 2	First-person shooter	1047 Games	1047 Games	Jun 6, 2025	Jun 6, 2025	Jun 6, 2025		
SpongeBob SquarePants: Battle for Bikini Bottom – Rehydrated	Action-adventure; platform	Purple Lamp Studios	THQ Nordic	Aug 20, 2020	Jun 23, 2020	Jun 23, 2020		
SpongeBob SquarePants: The Cosmic Shake	Action-adventure; platform	Purple Lamp Studios	THQ Nordic	Feb 28, 2023	Jan 31, 2023	Jan 31, 2023		
Spooky's Jump Scare Mansion: HD Renovation	Horror	Albino Moose Games	Albino Moose Games	Unreleased	Oct 29, 2019	Oct 29, 2019	VR	
Sportsfriends	Action, sports	Die Gute Fabrik	Die Gute Fabrik	Oct 23, 2014	May 6, 2014	May 7, 2014	C M	
Spy Chameleon	Puzzle	Unfinished Pixel	Unfinished Pixel	Unreleased	Jul 21, 2016	Jul 21, 2016		
Spyro Reignited Trilogy	Platform	Toys For Bob	Activision	Dec 18, 2018	Nov 13, 2018	Nov 13, 2018	P	
Squadron 51	Shoot 'em up	Loomiarts	Assemble Entertainment	TBA	TBA	TBA		
Square Heroes	Shooter	Gnomic Studios	Gnomic Studios	Unreleased	Mar 1, 2016	Mar 1, 2016	CP	
The Stanley Parable: Ultra Deluxe	Interactive story	Galactic Cafe; Crows Crows Crows	Galactic Cafe	Unreleased	Apr 27, 2022	Apr 27, 2022		
Stardew Valley	Role-playing	ConcernedApe	Chucklefish	Jan 31, 2019	Dec 13, 2016	Dec 14, 2016		
Stardust Galaxy Warriors: Stellar Climax	Shoot 'em up	Dreamloop Games	Dreamloop Games	Feb 7, 2020	Sep 12, 2016	Sep 9, 2016		
Star Hammer: The Vanguard Prophecy	Turn-based strategy	Black Lab Games	Slitherine	Unreleased	Sep 1, 2016	Sep 1, 2016		
Starlink: Battle for Atlas	Space combat	Ubisoft Toronto	Ubisoft	Apr 25, 2019	Oct 16, 2018	Oct 16, 2018		
Star Melody: Yumemi Dreamer	Rhythm	Kogado Studio	Kogado Studio	TBA	TBA	TBA		
Star Ocean: First Departure R	Action role-playing	Tri-Ace	Square Enix	Dec 5, 2019	Dec 5, 2019	Dec 5, 2019		
Star Ocean: Integrity and Faithlessness	Action role-playing	Tri-Ace	Square Enix	Feb 25, 2016	Jun 28, 2016	Jul 1, 2016		
Star Ocean: The Last Hope	Action role-playing	Tri-Ace	Square Enix	Nov 28, 2017	Nov 28, 2017	Nov 28, 2017	P	
Star Ocean: Second Evolution	Action role-playing	Tri-Ace	Square Enix	Oct 28, 2015	Unreleased	Unreleased		
Star Renegades	Role-playing	Massive Damage, Inc.	JP: DMM Games; WW: Raw Fury	Feb 25, 2021	Nov 25, 2020	Nov 25, 2020		
Star Trek: Bridge Crew	Adventure	Red Storm Entertainment	Ubisoft	May 31, 2017	May 30, 2017	May 30, 2017	CP VR	
Star Wars Battlefront	First- and third-person shooter	EA Dice	Electronic Arts; LucasArts	Nov 18, 2015	Nov 17, 2015	Nov 20, 2015	VR	
Star Wars Battlefront II	First- and third-person shooter	DICE / Motive Studios	Electronic Arts; LucasArts	Nov 17, 2017	Nov 17, 2017	Nov 17, 2017	P	
Star Wars Episode I: Racer	Racing	Raven Software	Aspyr Media	Dec 23, 2021	Jun 23, 2020	Jun 23, 2020		
Star Wars Episode I: Jedi Power Battles	Action	Aspyr	Aspyr	Jan 25, 2025	Jan 25, 2025	Jan 25, 2025		
Star Wars Jedi: Fallen Order	Action-adventure	Respawn Entertainment	Electronic Arts	Nov 15, 2019	Nov 15, 2019	Nov 15, 2019		
Star Wars Jedi: Survivor	Action-adventure	Respawn Entertainment	Electronic Arts	Sep 17, 2024	Sep 17, 2024	Sep 17, 2024		
Star Wars Jedi Knight: Jedi Academy	First- and third-person shooter	Raven Software	Apsyr Media	Dec 22, 2021	Mar 26, 2020	Mar 26, 2020		
Star Wars Jedi Knight II: Jedi Outcast	First- and third-person shooter	Raven Software	Apsyr Media	Dec 22, 2021	Sep 24, 2019	Sep 24, 2019		
Star Wars: Battlefront Classic Collection (Note: Remastered collection of Star Wars: Battlefront and Star Wars: Battlefront II.)	First-person shooter; Third-person shooter	Pandemic Studios; Aspyr	Aspyr	Mar 14, 2024	Mar 14, 2024	Mar 14, 2024		
Star Wars: Republic Commando	First-person shooter	LucasArts	Aspyr	Apr 6, 2021	Apr 6, 2021	Apr 6, 2021		
Star Wars: Squadrons	Space combat	Motive Studios	Electronic Arts	Oct 2, 2020	Oct 2, 2020	Oct 2, 2020	CP VR	
Starwhal: Just the Tip	Fighting	Breakfall	Breakfall	Unreleased	Feb 24, 2015	Mar 4, 2015		
State of Mind	Adventure	Daedalic Entertainment	Daedalic Entertainment	Nov 8, 2018	Aug 15, 2018	Aug 15, 2018		
Stay	Adventure; strategy	Appnormals Team	PQube	Dec 12, 2019	Sep 12, 2018	Dec 12, 2018		
Stay Cool, Kobayashi-san!: A River City Ransom Story	Adventure	Arc System Works	Arc System Works	Nov 7, 2019	Nov 7, 2019	Nov 7, 2019		
Stealth Inc: A Clone in the Dark	Platform; stealth	Curve Studios	Curve Digital	Aug 26, 2014	Mar 18, 2014	Mar 19, 2014		
Stealth Inc 2: A Game of Clones	Platform; stealth	Curve Studios	Curve Digital	Unreleased	Apr 7, 2014	Apr 8, 2015		
Steampunk Tower 2	Tower defense	DreamGate	Drageus Games	Unreleased	Dec 4, 2020	Dec 4, 2020		
Steam Tactics	Strategy; role-playing	Sometimes You	Sometimes You	Unreleased	Aug 5, 2020	Aug 5, 2020		
SteamWorld Dig	Platform	Image & Form	Image & Form	Dec 3, 2014	Mar 18, 2014	Mar 19, 2014		
SteamWorld Dig 2	Platform	Image & Form	Image & Form	Unreleased	Sep 27, 2017	Sep 26, 2017		
SteamWorld Heist	Adventure, platform	Image & Form	Image & Form	Unreleased	Jun 7, 2016	Jun 8, 2016		
Steep	Sports	Ubisoft Annecy	Ubisoft	Dec 2, 2016	Dec 2, 2016	Dec 2, 2016	P	
Steins;Gate 0	Visual novel	5pb.	5pb.	Dec 10, 2015	Nov 29, 2016	Nov 25, 2016		
Steins;Gate Elite	Visual novel	5pb.	5pb.	Sep 20, 2018	Feb 19, 2019	Feb 19, 2019		
Steins;Gate: My Darling's Embrace	Visual novel	5pb.	Spike Chunsoft	Unreleased	Dec 10, 2019	Dec 10, 2019		
Stellaris	4X; real-time strategy	Tantalus Media	Paradox Interactive	Aug 27, 2020	Feb 26, 2019	Feb 26, 2019		
Stellatum	Shoot 'em up	Satur Entertainment	Sometimes You	Unreleased	Oct 9, 2019	Oct 9, 2019		
Steredenn	Shooter	Pixelnest Studio	Plug In Digital	Oct 28, 2016	Jun 28, 2016	Jun 28, 2016		
Steven Universe: Save the Light	Role-playing	Grumpyface Studios	Cartoon Network	Unreleased	Oct 31, 2017	Oct 31, 2017		
Stick It to the Man!	Platform	Zoink Games	Ripstone Games	Jul 16, 2014	May 6, 2014	Apr 30, 2014		
Stickman: Far East Battle	Action	Gametry LLC	Gametry LLC	Oct 25, 2024	Oct 25, 2024	Oct 25, 2024		
Stifled	Adventure, horror	Gattai Games	Gattai Games	Jul 5, 2018	Oct 31, 2017	Oct 31, 2017	VR	
Stikbold! A Dodgeball Adventure	Fighting; sports	Game Swing	Reign Bros	Unreleased	Apr 5, 2016	Apr 5, 2016		
Storm Boy	Adventure; role-playing	Blowfish Studios	Level 77	Unreleased	Nov 21, 2018	Nov 20, 2018		
Stories: The Path of Destinies	Action role-playing	Spearhead Games	Spearhead Games	Unreleased	Apr 12, 2016	Apr 12, 2016		
Stories Untold	Adventure; horror	No Code	Devolver Digital	Oct 26, 2020	Oct 27, 2020	Oct 27, 2020		
Strafe	First-person shooter	Pixel Titans	Devolver Digital	Unreleased	May 9, 2017	May 9, 2017		
Straimium Immortaly	Shoot 'em up; roguelike	Anthony Case; Caiysware	Digerati	Unreleased	Dec 17, 2019	Dec 18, 2019		
Stranded Deep	Survival	Beam Team Games	Beam Team Games	Unreleased	Apr 21, 2020	Apr 21, 2020		
Stranded Sails: Explorers of the Cursed Islands	Role-playing	Lemonbomb Games	Merge Games; Rokapublish	Nov 7, 2019	Oct 17, 2019	Oct 17, 2019		
Strange Brigade	Action-adventure	Rebellion	505 Games	Unreleased	Aug 28, 2018	Aug 28, 2018	P	
Stranger of Paradise: Final Fantasy Origin	Action role-playing	Team Ninja	Square Enix	Mar 18, 2022	Mar 18, 2022	Mar 18, 2022		
Stranger Things 3: The Game	Action-adventure	Bonus XP	Bonus XP	Aug 21, 2019	Jul 4, 2019	Jul 4, 2019		
Stray	Adventure	BlueTwelve	Annapurna Interactive	Jul 19, 2022	Jul 19, 2022	Jul 19, 2022		
Street Fighter 30th Anniversary Collection	Fighting	Capcom	Capcom	Oct 25, 2018	May 29, 2018	May 29, 2018		
Street Fighter V	Fighting	Capcom; Dimps	Capcom	Feb 16, 2016	Feb 16, 2016	Feb 16, 2016	CP	
Street Fighter V: Arcade Edition	Fighting	Capcom; Dimps	Capcom	Jan 16, 2018	Jan 16, 2018	Jan 19, 2018	CP	
Street Fighter V: Champion Edition	Fighting	Capcom; Dimps	Capcom	Feb 14, 2020	Feb 14, 2020	Feb 14, 2020	CP	
Street Fighter 6	Fighting	Capcom	Capcom	Jun 2, 2023	Jun 2, 2023	Jun 2, 2023	CP	
Streets of Rage 4	Beat 'em up	DotEmu; Lizardcube; Guard Crush Games	DotEmu	Apr 30, 2020	Apr 30, 2020	Apr 30, 2020		
Streets of Rogue	Role-playing	Matt Dabrowski	tinyBuild	Unreleased	Jul 12, 2019	Jul 12, 2019		
Strider	Action-adventure; Platform	Double Helix Games	Capcom	Feb 22, 2014	Feb 18, 2014	Feb 19, 2014		
Strike Suit Zero	Space combat	Born Ready Games	Born Ready Games	Unreleased	Apr 4, 2014	Apr 4, 2014		
Strike Vector EX	Mech-combat; shooter	Ragequit Corporation	Ragequit Corporation	Unreleased	Aug 30, 2016	Aug 30, 2016		
Strikers 1945	Shoot 'em up	Zerodiv	City Connection	Jun 29, 2022	Jun 29, 2022	Jun 29, 2022		
Strikers 1945 II	Shoot 'em up	Zerodiv	City Connection	Jul 13, 2022	Jul 13, 2022	Jul 13, 2022		
Strikers 1945 III	Shoot 'em up	Zerodiv	City Connection	Jul 13, 2022	Jul 13, 2022	Jul 13, 2022		
Stubbs the Zombie in Rebel Without a Pulse	Action	Wideload Games	Aspyr	Oct 28, 2021	Mar 16, 2021	Mar 16, 2021		
Styx: Master of Shadows	Stealth	Cyanide	Focus Home Interactive	Unreleased	Oct 7, 2014	Oct 7, 2014		
Styx: Shards of Darkness	Stealth	Cyanide	Focus Home Interactive	Dec 14, 2017	Mar 14, 2017	Mar 14, 2017		
Sublevel Zero Redux	Shooter	Sigtrap Games	Merge Games	Unreleased	Mar 7, 2017	Mar 8, 2017		
Submerged	Adventure	Uppercut Games	Uppercut Games	Jul 12, 2016	Aug 4, 2015	Aug 5, 2015		
Subnautica	Action-adventure; survival	Unknown Worlds Entertainment	Unknown Worlds Entertainment	Mar 19, 2020	Dec 4, 2018	Dec 4, 2018	P	
Subnautica: Below Zero	Action-adventure; survival	Unknown Worlds Entertainment	Unknown Worlds Entertainment	May 14, 2021	May 14, 2021	May 14, 2021		
Subterrain	Action; survival	Pixellore	Pixellore	Jan 27, 2017	Jan 27, 2017	Jan 27, 2017		
Sudden Strike 4	Real-time strategy	Kite Games	Kalypso Media	Nov 9, 2017	Aug 15, 2017	Aug 11, 2017	P	
The Suicide of Rachel Foster	Adventure	One-O-One Games	Daedalic Entertainment	Unreleased	Sep 9, 2020	Sep 9, 2020		
Suikoden I&II HD Remaster Gate Rune and Dunan Unification Wars	Role Playing game	Konami Digital Entertainment	Konami Digital Entertainment	Mar 6, 2025	Mar 6, 2025	Mar 6, 2025		
Summer in Mara	Adventure	Chibig Studio	Chibig Studio	Unreleased	Dec 9, 2020	Dec 9, 2020		
Summer Time Rendering: Another Horizon	Visual novel	Mages	Mages	Jan 26, 2023	Unreleased	Unreleased		
Summon Night 6	Simulation role-playing	Media.Vision; Felistella	Bandai Namco Entertainment	Mar 10, 2016	Oct 31, 2017	Nov 15, 2017		
The Sun and Moon	Puzzle	Daniel Linssen	Digerati	Unreleased	Apr 26, 2016	Apr 27, 2016		
Sundered	Metroidvania	Thunder Lotus Games	Thunder Lotus Games	Aug 28, 2017	Jul 28, 2017	Jul 28, 2017		
Sunless Sea: Zubmariner Edition	Roguelike	Failbetter Games	Failbetter Games	Unreleased	Aug 28, 2018	Aug 28, 2018		
Sunless Skies: Sovereign Edition	Role-playing	Failbetter Games	Digerati	Unreleased	TBA	TBA		
Sunshine Manor	Horror; role-playing	Fossil Games	Fossil Games	Unreleased	TBA	TBA		
Superbeat: Xonic	Music, rhythm	PM Studios	Rising Star Games	Unreleased	Jun 6, 2017	Jun 7, 2017		
Super Blood Hockey	Sports	Loren Lemke	Digerati	Unreleased	Jun 4, 2019	Jun 5, 2019		
Super Bomberman R	Action; puzzle	Konami	Konami	Jun 12, 2018	Jun 12, 2018	Jun 12, 2018		
Super Buckyball Tournament	Sports	Pathea Games	Pathea Games	Unreleased	TBA	TBA		
Super Cane Magic Zero	Role-playing	Studio Evil	Studio Evil	Aug 29, 2019	May 30, 2019	May 30, 2019		
Super Cloudbuilt	Platform	Coilworks	Double Eleven	Jul 25, 2017	Jul 25, 2017	Jul 25, 2017		
Super Dodgeball Beats	Music; rhythm; sports	FinalBoss Games	PlayStack	Nov 7, 2019	Sep 12, 2019	Sep 12, 2019		
Super Dungeon Bros	Action	React! Games	Wired Productions	Jun 30, 2017	Nov 1, 2016	Nov 1, 2016	CP	
SuperEpic: The Entertainment War	Action-adventure; metroidvania	Undercoders	Numskull Games	Jun 3, 2020	Dec 12, 2019	Dec 12, 2019		
Super Exploding Zoo	Puzzle	Honeyslug	Honeyslug	Aug 5, 2015	Jun 2, 2015	Jun 2, 2015	CP	
Superhot	First-person shooter	Superhot Team	Superhot Team	Jul 19, 2017	Jul 19, 2017	Jul 19, 2017	VR	
Superhot: Mind Control Delete	First-person shooter	Superhot Team	Superhot Team	Unreleased	Jul 16, 2020	Jul 16, 2020		
Super Hydorah	Shoot 'em up	Abylight Studios	Abylight Studios	Unreleased	Dec 13, 2017	Dec 13, 2017		
Superliminal	Puzzle	Pillow Castle	Pillow Castle	Jul 7, 2020	Jul 7, 2020	Jul 7, 2020		
Supermarket Shriek	Kart racing	Billy Goat Entertainment	PQube	Unreleased	Oct 23, 2020	Oct 23, 2020		
Super Meat Boy	Platform	Team Meat	Team Meat	Unreleased	Oct 6, 2015	Oct 6, 2015		
Super Meat Boy Forever	Platform	Team Meat	Team Meat	Unreleased	Apr 16, 2021	Apr 16, 2021		
Super Mega Baseball	Sports	Metalhead Software	Metalhead Software	Unreleased	Dec 16, 2014	Apr 1, 2015		
Super Mega Baseball 2	Sports	Metalhead Software	Metalhead Software	Unreleased	May 1, 2018	May 1, 2018	CP	
Super Mega Baseball 3	Sports	Metalhead Software	Metalhead Software	Unreleased	May 13, 2020	May 13, 2020	CP	
Super Monkey Ball: Banana Blitz	Platform	Ryu Ga Gotoku Studio	Sega	Oct 30, 2019	Oct 29, 2019	Oct 29, 2019		
Super Monkey Ball: Banana Mania	Platform	Ryu Ga Gotoku Studio	Sega	Oct 7, 2021	Oct 5, 2021	Oct 5, 2021		
Super Motherload	Puzzle, role-playing	XGen Studios	XGen Studios	Unreleased	Nov 15, 2013	Nov 29, 2013		
Super Mutant Alien Assault	Platform	Cybernate	Surprise Attack Games	Unreleased	Jul 12, 2016	Jul 12, 2016		
Super Neptunia RPG	Role-playing	Artisan Studios	Idea Factory	Dec 20, 2018	Jun 28, 2019	Jun 25, 2019		
Super Pixel Racers	Racing	21c Ducks	H2 Interactive, PQube	Nov 1, 2018	Oct 31, 2018	Oct 31, 2018	P	
Super Robot Wars 30	Tactical role-playing	B.B. Studio	Bandai Namco	Oct 28, 2021	Unreleased	Unreleased		
Super Robot Wars OG: The Moon Dwellers	Tactical role-playing	Bandai Namco Entertainment	Bandai Namco Entertainment	Jun 30, 2016	Unreleased	Unreleased		
Super Robot Wars T	Tactical role-playing	B.B. Studio	Bandai Namco	Mar 20, 2019	Unreleased	Unreleased		
Super Robot Wars V	Tactical role-playing	B.B. Studio	Bandai Namco	Feb 23, 2017	Unreleased	Unreleased		
Super Robot Wars X	Tactical role-playing	B.B. Studio	Bandai Namco	Mar 29, 2018	Unreleased	Unreleased	CP	
Super Rude Bear Resurrection	Platform	Alex Rose	Alex Rose Games	Unreleased	May 2, 2017	May 2, 2017		
Super Stardust Ultra	Shoot 'em up	Housemarque	Sony Computer Entertainment	Mar 12, 2015	Feb 11, 2015	Feb 11, 2015	3D VR	
Super Star Wars	Action	Code Mystics	Disney Interactive	Unreleased	Nov 17, 2015	Nov 24, 2015		
Super Time Force Ultra	Shooter, side-scroller	Capybara Games	Capybara Games	May 11, 2016	Sep 1, 2015	Sep 1, 2015		
Super Toy Cars	Racing	Eclipse Games	Eclipse Games	Unreleased	Jan 5, 2016	Jan 5, 2016		
Super Woden GP	Racing	ViJuDa	Eastasiasoft	Nov 9, 2022	Nov 9, 2022	Nov 9, 2022		
Supraland	Action; puzzle	Supra Games	Humble Games	Oct 22, 2020	Oct 22, 2020	Oct 22, 2020		
The Surge	Action role-playing	Deck13	Focus Home Interactive	Nov 30, 2017	May 16, 2017	May 16, 2017	P	
The Surge 2	Action role-playing	Deck 13	Focus Home Interactive	Dec 19, 2019	Sep 24, 2019	Sep 24, 2019		
Surgeon Simulator	Simulation	Bossa Studios	Bossa Studios	Unreleased	Aug 12, 2014	Aug 13, 2014	C	
The Survivalists	Strategy; survival	Team17	Team17	Oct 9, 2020	Oct 9, 2020	Oct 9, 2020		
Surviving Mars	Simulation; city-building	Haemimont Games	Paradox Interactive	Unreleased	Mar 15, 2018	Mar 15, 2018	P	
Surviving the Aftermath	Simulation; city-building	Iceflake Studios	Paradox Interactive	Unreleased	Nov 16, 2021	Nov 16, 2021		
The Sushi Spinnery	Simulation	Kairosoft	Kairosoft	Oct 21, 2020	Oct 22, 2020	Oct 22, 2020		
The Swapper	Platform; puzzle	Curve Studios	Facepalm Games	Nov 4, 2015	Aug 5, 2014	Aug 6, 2014		
Swimsanity!	Shooter	Decoy Games	Decoy Games	Unreleased	TBA	TBA		
The Swindle	Platform, stealth	Size Five Games	Curve Digital	Unreleased	Jul 28, 2015	Jul 28, 2015		
Switch Galaxy Ultra	Racing	Atomicom	Atomicom	Unreleased	Dec 23, 2014	Dec 17, 2014	CP	
Sword & Fairy 6	Role-playing	Softstar	EastAsiaSoft	Unreleased	Apr 2, 2019	Apr 3, 2019		
Sword Art Online: Alicization Lycoris	Role-playing	Aquria	Bandai Namco	Jul 9, 2020	Jul 10, 2020	Jul 10, 2020		
Sword Art Online: Fatal Bullet	Role-playing; shooter	Dimps	Bandai Namco	Feb 8, 2018	Feb 23, 2018	Feb 23, 2018		
Sword Art Online Re: Hollow Fragment Director's Cut	Role-playing	Aquria	Bandai Namco	Nov 19, 2015	Jul 28, 2015	Aug 4, 2015		
Sword Art Online: Hollow Realization	Role-playing	Bandai Namco	Bandai Namco	Oct 27, 2016	Nov 8, 2016	Nov 8, 2016	P	
Sword Art Online: Last Recollection	Action role-playing	Aquria	Bandai Namco	Oct 5, 2023	Oct 6, 2023	Oct 6, 2023		
Sword Art Online: Lost Song	Role-playing	Artdink	Bandai Namco	Nov 19, 2015	Nov 17, 2015	Nov 13, 2015		
Sword Coast Legends	Role-playing	n-Space / Digital Extremes	Digital Extremes	Unreleased	Jul 19, 2016	Jul 19, 2016		
Swords & Soldiers II: Shawarmageddon	Real-time strategy	Ronimo Games	Ronimo Games	Unreleased	Nov 13, 2018	Nov 13, 2018		
The Swords of Ditto	Action role-playing	One Bit Beyond	Devolver Digital	May 10, 2018	Apr 24, 2018	Apr 24, 2018		
Sword of the Necromancer	Roguelike; role-playing	Grimorio of Games	JanduSoft	Jan 28, 2021	Jan 28, 2021	Jan 28, 2021		
Syberia 3	Adventure	Anuman	Microïds	Unreleased	Apr 25, 2017	Apr 20, 2017		
Synthetik: Ultimate	Tactical shooter	Flow Fire	Flow Fire	Unreleased	TBA	TBA		
Syrup and The Ultimate Sweet	Visual novel	Nom Nom Nami	Ratalaika Games	Unreleased	Mar 4, 2020	Mar 4, 2020		
System Shock	Action role-playing	Night Dive Studios	Night Dive Studios	TBA	TBA	TBA		
Table Top Racing: World Tour	Racing	Playrise Digital	Playrise Digital	May 3, 2016	Jul 6, 2016	May 3, 2016		
Tachyon Project	Shooter	Eclipse Games	Eclipse Games	Aug 22, 2017	Jan 19, 2016	Jan 19, 2016		
Taiko no Tatsujin: Drum Session!	Rhythm	Bandai Namco	Bandai Namco	Oct 26, 2017	Nov 2, 2018	Nov 2, 2018		
The TakeOver	Beat 'em up	Pelikan13	Dangen Entertainment, Limited Run Games	May 20, 2021	May 20, 2021	May 20, 2021		
Tales from the Borderlands	Graphic adventure	Telltale Games	Telltale Games	Unreleased	Nov 26, 2014	Nov 26, 2014		
Tales of Arise	Action role-playing	Bandai Namco Studios	Bandai Namco Entertainment	Sep 9, 2021	Sep 10, 2021	Sep 10, 2021		
Tales of Berseria	Role-playing	Bandai Namco Entertainment	Bandai Namco Entertainment	Aug 18, 2016	Jan 24, 2017	Jan 27, 2017		
Tales of Graces f Remastered	Role-playing	Tose	Bandai Namco Entertainment	Jan 17, 2025	Jan 17, 2025	Jan 17, 2025		
Tales of the Neon Sea	Adventure	Zodiac Interactive	Zodiac Interactive	TBA	TBA	TBA		
Tales of Vesperia: Definitive Edition	Role-playing	Bandai Namco Entertainment	Bandai Namco Entertainment	Jan 11, 2019	Jan 11, 2019	Jan 11, 2019		
Tales of Zestiria	Role-playing	Bandai Namco Entertainment	Bandai Namco Entertainment	Jul 7, 2016	Oct 20, 2015	Oct 16, 2015		
The Talos Principle	Puzzle	Croteam	Devolver Digital	Unreleased	Oct 13, 2015	Oct 13, 2015		
Tamarin	Action-adventure	Chameleon Games	Chameleon Games	Sep 10, 2020	Sep 10, 2020	Sep 10, 2020	P	
Tandem: A Tale of Shadows	Puzzle; platform	Monochrome	Hatinh Interactive	Unreleased	Oct 21, 2021	Oct 21, 2021		
Tannenberg	First-person shooter	M2H; Blackmill Games	M2H; Blackmill Games	Aug 18, 2020	Jul 24, 2020	Jul 24, 2020	CP P	
Tantei Bokumetsu	Adventure	Nippon Ichi Software	Nippon Ichi Software	May 27, 2021	Unreleased	Unreleased		
Tasomachi: Behind the Twilight	Action-adventure	Orbital Express	Playism	Apr 28, 2022	Apr 28, 2022	Apr 28, 2022		
Taxi Chaos	Racing	Team6 Game Studios	Lion Castle Entertainment	Unreleased	Feb 23, 2021	Feb 25, 2021		
Tchia	Adventure	Awaceb	Awaceb	Mar 21, 2023	Mar 21, 2023	Mar 21, 2023		
Team Sonic Racing	Racing	Sumo Digital	Sega	May 21, 2019	May 21, 2019	May 21, 2019		
Tearaway Unfolded	Platform	Media Molecule	Sony Computer Entertainment	Sep 8, 2015	Sep 8, 2015	Sep 8, 2015	C	
The Technomancer	Role-playing	Spiders	Focus Home Interactive	Unreleased	Jun 28, 2016	Jun 28, 2016		
Teenage Mutant Ninja Turtles Arcade: Wrath of the Mutants	Fighting	Raw Thrills; Cradle Games	GameMill Entertainment	Jun 28, 2024	Apr 23, 2024	Apr 23, 2024		
Teenage Mutant Ninja Turtles: The Cowabunga Collection	Various	Digital Eclipse	Konami	Unreleased	Aug 30, 2022	Aug 30, 2022		
Teenage Mutant Ninja Turtles: Mutants in Manhattan	Fighting	PlatinumGames	Activision	Unreleased	May 27, 2016	May 24, 2016		
Teenage Mutant Ninja Turtles: Mutants Unleashed	Beat 'em up; Platformer	Aheartfulofgames	Outright Games	Unreleased	Oct 18, 2024	Oct 18, 2024		
Teenage Mutant Ninja Turtles: Shredder's Revenge	Beat 'em up	Tribute Games	Dotemu	Jun 16, 2022	Jun 16, 2022	Jun 16, 2022		
Tekken 7	Fighting	Bandai Namco	Bandai Namco	Jun 2, 2017	Jun 2, 2017	Jun 2, 2017	P VR	
Telling Lies	Adventure	Sam Barlow; Furious Bee	Annapurna Interactive	Unreleased	Apr 28, 2020	Apr 29, 2020		
Tembo the Badass Elephant	Platform	Game Freak	Sega	Unreleased	Jul 21, 2015	Jul 21, 2015		
Tempest 4000	Shoot 'em up	Llamasoft	Atari	Unreleased	Jul 17, 2017	Jul 17, 2017		
Tennis in the Face	Puzzle	10tons	10tons	Unreleased	Dec 9, 2014	Dec 9, 2014		
Tennis World Tour	Sports	Breakpoint Studio	Bigben Interactive	May 22, 2018	May 22, 2018	May 22, 2018		
Tennis World Tour 2	Sports	Big Ant Studios	Nacon	Sep 24, 2020	Sep 24, 2020	Sep 24, 2020		
The Tenth Line	Role-playing	Sungazer Software	Sungazer Software	Unreleased	Jun 27, 2017	Oct 19, 2017		
Terminator: Resistance	First-person shooter	Teyon	Reef Entertainment	Aug 26, 2020	Jan 7, 2020	Nov 15, 2019	CB P	
Terraria	Action-adventure	505 Games	505 Games	Nov 14, 2014	Nov 14, 2014	Nov 14, 2014	CP	
TerraTech	Vehicular sandbox	Payload Studios	Payload Studios	Aug 24, 2022	Aug 14, 2018	Aug 14, 2018		
Teslagrad	Platform; puzzle	Rain Games	Rain Games	Feb 18, 2015	Dec 3, 2014	Dec 3, 2014		
Tesla Force	Shooter	10tons	10tons	Unreleased	Nov 24, 2020	Nov 24, 2020	CB	
Tesla vs Lovecraft	Twin-stick shooter	10tons	10tons	Unreleased	Mar 13, 2018	Mar 13, 2018		
Tethered	Simulation	Secret Sorcery	Secret Sorcery	Dec 22, 2016	Oct 8, 2016	Oct 8, 2016	P VR	
Tetraminos	Puzzle	Sanuk Games	Bigben Interactive	Unreleased	Mar 8, 2016	Mar 8, 2016		
Tetris Effect	Puzzle	Enhance Games	Enhance Games	Nov 9, 2018	Nov 9, 2018	Nov 9, 2018	VR	
Tetris Ultimate	Puzzle	SoMa Play	Ubisoft	Jun 10, 2015	Dec 16, 2014	Dec 17, 2014		
The Texas Chain Saw Massacre	Survival horror	Sumo Nottingham	Gun Interactive	Unreleased	Aug 18, 2023	Aug 18, 2023		
Thank Goodness You're Here!	Adventure	Coal Supper	Panic	Aug 1, 2024	Aug 1, 2024	Aug 1, 2024		
Tharsis	Turn-based strategy	Choice Provisions	Choice Provisions	Unreleased	Jan 12, 2016	Jan 12, 2016		
That's You!	Party	Wish Studios	Sony Interactive Entertainment	Unreleased	Jul 4, 2017	Jul 4, 2017	PL	
Thea: The Awakening	Turn-based strategy	MuHa Games	MuHa Games	Unreleased	May 31, 2017	May 31, 2017	P	
TheHunter: Call of the Wild	Simulation	Expansive Worlds	Expansive Worlds	Unreleased	Oct 2, 2017	Oct 2, 2017		
TheHunter: Call of the Wild - 2021 Edition	Simulation	Expansive Worlds	Expansive Worlds	Unreleased	Sep 28, 2020	Sep 28, 2020		
There Came an Echo	Real-time strategy	Iridium Studios	Iridium Studios	Unreleased	Feb 24, 2015	Feb 24, 2015		
They Are Billions	Real-time strategy; city-building	Numantian Games	BlitWorks	Aug 20, 2020	Jul 9, 2019	Jul 9, 2019		
Thief	Stealth	Eidos Montréal	Square Enix	Jun 12, 2014	Feb 25, 2014	Feb 28, 2014		
Thief Town	Party	Glass Knuckle Games	Glass Knuckle Games	Unreleased	Sep 29, 2015	Unreleased		
Thimbleweed Park	Point-and-click adventure	Terrible Toybox	Terrible Toybox	Unreleased	Aug 22, 2017	Aug 22, 2017	P	
This Is Pool	Sports	VooFoo Studios	VooFoo Studios	Unreleased	TBA	TBA	P	
This Is Snooker	Sports	VooFoo Studios	VooFoo Studios	Unreleased	TBA	TBA	P	
This Is the Police	Adventure, strategy	Weappy Studio	THQ Nordic	Unreleased	Mar 22, 2017	Mar 22, 2017	P	
This War of Mine: The Little Ones	Survival	11 Bit Studios	Deep Silver	Unreleased	Jan 29, 2016	Jan 29, 2016		
Thomas & Friends: Wonders of Sodor	Adventure; simulation	Dovetail Games	Dovetail Games	Mar 17, 2026	Mar 17, 2026	Mar 17, 2026		
Thomas Was Alone	Platform; puzzle	Curve Digital	Curve Digital	Unreleased	Nov 25, 2014	Nov 25, 2014		
Those Who Remain	Survival Horror	Camel 101, Warp Digital Limited	Wired Productions	Unreleased	May 28, 2020	May 28, 2020		
Through the Darkest of Times	Adventure; strategy	Paintbucket Games	HandyGames	Oct 21, 2020	Aug 13, 2020	Aug 13, 2020		
Thumper	Music; rhythm	Drool	Drool	Oct 13, 2016	Oct 13, 2016	Oct 13, 2016	P VR	
Ticket to Ride	Card & board; strategy	Asmodee Digital	Asmodee Digital	Unreleased	Nov 13, 2018	Nov 14, 2018	PL	
Time Recoil	Twin-stick shooter	10tons	10tons	Unreleased	Sep 12, 2017	Jan 31, 2018		
Timespinner	Metroidvania; platform	Lunar Ray Games	Chucklefish	Jun 3, 2020	Sep 25, 2018	Sep 25, 2018		
Timothy vs. the Aliens	Action; platform	Wild Sphere	Square Enix	Unreleased	Jan 31, 2017	Jan 31, 2017		
Tina's Toy Factory	Puzzle	Strange Games Studios	Strange Games Studios	Unreleased	Aug 25, 2015	Aug 25, 2015		
Tinertia	Platform	Candescent Games	Candescent Games	Unreleased	Jun 20, 2017	Unreleased	P VR	
Tiny Brains	Puzzle	Spearhead Games	Spearhead Games	Feb 22, 2014	Dec 3, 2013	Nov 29, 2013		
Tiny Metal	Turn-based tactics	Area 34	Unties	Dec 21, 2017	Dec 21, 2017	Dec 21, 2017		
Tiny Tina's Wonderlands	Action role-playing; first-person shooter	Gearbox Software	2K	Mar 25, 2022	Mar 25, 2022	Mar 25, 2022		
Tiny Troopers: Joint Ops	Shooter	Kukouri Mobile Entertainment	Wired Productions	Jul 10, 2015	Nov 19, 2014	Nov 19, 2014		
Titan Attacks!	Shooter	Puppy Games	Curve Digital	Jan 14, 2015	May 6, 2014	May 7, 2014		
Titan Souls	Action-adventure	Acid Nerve	Devolver Digital	Unreleased	Apr 14, 2015	Apr 15, 2015		
Titanfall 2	First-person shooter	Respawn Entertainment	Electronic Arts	Oct 28, 2016	Oct 28, 2016	Oct 28, 2016	P	
To All of Mankind	Adventure	Acquire	Nippon Ichi Software	Jun 27, 2019	Unreleased	Unreleased		
Toby: The Secret Mine	Action-adventure	Lukáš Navrátil	Headup Games	Jul 9, 2020	Jul 6, 2017	Jul 6, 2017		
ToeJam & Earl: Back in the Groove	Adventure	HumaNature Studios	Adult Swim Games	Jan 10, 2020	Mar 1, 2019	Mar 1, 2019		
TOHU	Adventure	Fireart Games	The Irregular Corporation	Unreleased	Jan 28, 2021	Jan 28, 2021		
Toki	Platform	Microids	Microids	Unreleased	Jun 6, 2019	Jun 6, 2019		
Toki Tori 2+	Platform; puzzle	Two Tribes	Two Tribes	Feb 23, 2016	Feb 23, 2016	Feb 23, 2016		
Tokyo 42	Action	Smac Games	Mode 7	May 31, 2017	May 31, 2017	May 31, 2017		
Tokyo Chronos	Visual novel	MyDearest	JP: MyDearest	Aug 22, 2022	Aug 22, 2022		VR	
Tokyo Dark: Remembrance	Point-and-click adventure	Cherrymochi	JP: Unties; WW: Square Enix	Jan 10, 2020	Jan 10, 2020	Jan 10, 2020		
Tokyo Ghoul: re Call to Exist	Action	Three Rings Design	Bandai Namco Entertainment	Nov 14, 2019	Nov 15, 2019	Nov 15, 2019		
Tokyo Xanadu eX+	Action role-playing	Nihon Falcom	Aksys Games	Sep 8, 2016	Dec 8, 2017	Dec 8, 2017		
Tomb Raider	Action-adventure, Action role-playing	Crystal Dynamics	Square Enix	Feb 22, 2014	Jan 28, 2014	Jan 31, 2014		
Tomb Raider I-III Remastered	Action-adventure	Aspyr	Aspyr	Feb 14, 2024	Feb 14, 2024	Feb 14, 2024		
Tomb Raider IV-VI Remastered	Action-adventure	Aspyr	Aspyr	Feb 14, 2025	Feb 14, 2025	Feb 14, 2025		
Tom Clancy's Ghost Recon Breakpoint	First-person shooter	Ubisoft Paris	Ubisoft	Oct 4, 2019	Oct 4, 2019	Oct 4, 2019		
Tom Clancy's Ghost Recon Wildlands	Third-person shooter	Ubisoft Paris	Ubisoft	Mar 7, 2017	Mar 7, 2017	Mar 7, 2017	P	
Tom Clancy's Rainbow Six Extraction	First-person shooter	Ubisoft Montreal	Ubisoft	Jan 20, 2022	Jan 20, 2022	Jan 20, 2022	P	
Tom Clancy's Rainbow Six: Siege	First-person shooter	Ubisoft Montreal	Ubisoft	Dec 10, 2015	Oct 13, 2015	Oct 13, 2015	CB P	
Tom Clancy's The Division	Action role-playing	Massive Entertainment	Ubisoft	Mar 10, 2016	Mar 8, 2016	Mar 8, 2016	P	
Tom Clancy's The Division 2	Action role-playing	Massive Entertainment	Ubisoft	Mar 15, 2019	Mar 15, 2019	Mar 15, 2019	P	
Tony Hawk's Pro Skater 1+2	Sports	Vicarious Visions	Activision	Sep 4, 2020	Sep 4, 2020	Sep 4, 2020	P	
Tony Hawk's Pro Skater 3 + 4	Sports	Iron Galaxy	Activision	Jul 11, 2025	Jul 11, 2025	Jul 11, 2025		
Tony Hawk's Pro Skater 5	Extreme sports	Robomodo	Activision	Unreleased	Sep 29, 2015	Oct 2, 2015		
Tony Stewart's All-American Racing	Racing	Monster Games	Monster Games	Unreleased	Sep 4, 2020	Sep 4, 2020		
Tony Stewart's Sprint Car Racing	Racing	Monster Games	Monster Games	Unreleased	Feb 14, 2020	Mar 6, 2020		
TopSpin 2K25	Sports	Hungar 13	2K	Apr 23, 2024	Apr 23, 2024	Apr 23, 2024		
Tools Up!	Action	Knights of Unity	All In! Games	Mar 19, 2020	Dec 3, 2019	Dec 3, 2019		
Tooth and Tail	Real-time strategy	Pocketwatch Games	Pocketwatch Games	Unreleased	Sep 12, 2017	Sep 12, 2017	CP	
Torchlight II	Action role-playing; hack and slash	Runic Games	Panic Button	Unreleased	Sep 3, 2019	Sep 3, 2019		
Torchlight III	Action role-playing; hack and slash	Echtra Games	Perfect World Entertainment	Unreleased	Oct 13, 2020	Oct 13, 2020		
Toren	Adventure; puzzle	Swordtales	Versus Evil	Unreleased	May 12, 2015	May 14, 2015		
Torment: Tides of Numenera	Role-playing	inXile Entertainment	Techland	Feb 28, 2017	Feb 28, 2017	Feb 28, 2017		
Tormented Souls	Survival horror	Dual Effect	PQube	Feb 25, 2022	Feb 25, 2022	Feb 25, 2022		
TorqueL	Platform; puzzle	Full Power Side Attack	Playism	Dec 24, 2014	Aug 11, 2015	Aug 11, 2015		
Totally Accurate Battle Simulator	Strategy	Landfall Games	Landfall Games	Sep 5, 2023	Sep 5, 2023	Sep 5, 2023		
Totally Reliable Delivery Service	Action	We're Five Games	tinyBuild	Unreleased	Apr 1, 2020	Apr 1, 2020		
Tottemo E Mahjong Plus	Board game	Arc System Works	Arc System Works	Feb 22, 2014	Unreleased	Unreleased		
Touhou Kobuto V: Burst Battle	Fighting	Cube Type	NIS America	Nov 2, 2016	Oct 10, 2017	Oct 13, 2017		
Touhou Labyrinth: Gensokyo to Tenkan no Taiju	Role-playing	Cubetype; Nise-Eikoku Shinshidan	Phoenixx	Jul 16, 2020	Unreleased	Unreleased		
Touhou Sōjin Engi: The Genius of Sappheiros	Dōjin	Strawberry Bose	Mediascape	TBA	TBA	TBA		
Touhou Sky Arena Matsuri	Dōjin	Area-Zero	Mediascape	May 6, 2016	Jul 30, 2018	Aug 7, 2018		
Toukiden 2	Action role-playing	Koei Tecmo	Koei Tecmo	Jun 30, 2016	Mar 21, 2017	Apr 21, 2017	CP	
Toukiden: Kiwami	Action role-playing	Koei Tecmo	Koei Tecmo	Unreleased	Mar 31, 2015	Mar 27, 2015	CP	
Tour de France 2014	Sports	Cyanide Studio	Focus Home Interactive	Jun 22, 2014	Jun 22, 2014	Jun 22, 2014		
Tour de France 2015	Sports	Cyanide Studio	Focus Home Interactive	Jun 23, 2015	Jun 23, 2015	Jun 23, 2015		
Tour de France 2016	Sports	Koch Media	Focus Home Interactive	Jun 16, 2016	Jun 16, 2016	Jun 16, 2016		
Tour de France 2017	Sports	Cyanide Studio	Focus Home Interactive	Jun 28, 2017	Jun 28, 2017	Jun 28, 2017		
Tour de France 2018	Sports	Cyanide Studio	Focus Home Interactive	Jun 28, 2018	Jun 28, 2018	Jun 28, 2018		
Tour de France 2019	Sports	Nacon	Bigben Interactive	Jul 28, 2019	Jul 28, 2019	Jul 28, 2019		
Tour de France 2020	Sports	Cyanide Studio	Nacon	Jun 4, 2020	Jun 4, 2020	Jun 4, 2020		
Tour de France 2021	Sports	Cyanide Studio	Nacon	Mar 6, 2021	Mar 6, 2021	Mar 6, 2021		
Tour de France 2022	Sports	Cyanide Studio	Nacon	Jun 28, 2022	Jun 28, 2022	Jun 28, 2022		
Tour de France 2023	Sports	Cyanide Studio	Nacon	Jun 8, 2023	Jun 8, 2023	Jun 8, 2023		
Tour de France 2024	Sports	Cyanide Studio	Nacon	Jun 6, 2024	Jun 6, 2024	Jun 6, 2024		
Touring Karts	Racing; vehicular combat	Ivanovich Games	Ivanovich Games	Unreleased	Dec 12, 2019	Dec 12, 2019	CP VR	
The Touryst	Action-adventure	Shin'en Multimedia	Shin'en Multimedia	Sep 9, 2021	Sep 9, 2021	Sep 9, 2021		
Tower 57	Shooter	Pixwerk	11 Bit Studios	TBA	TBA	TBA		
TowerFall Ascension	Arena combat, platform	Matt Thorson	Matt Makes Games	Jul 16, 2014	Mar 11, 2014	Mar 19, 2014		
Tower of Guns	First-person shooter	Terrible Posture Games	Terrible Posture Games	May 7, 2015	Apr 8, 2015	Apr 8, 2015		
Tower of Time	Action; strategy	Event Horizon	Digerati	Unreleased	Jun 23, 2020	Jun 24, 2020		
Tower Princess	Action	AweKteaM	HypeTrain Digital	Sep 8, 2022	Sep 8, 2022	Sep 8, 2022		
The Town of Light	Adventure, horror	LKA	Wired Productions	Jun 6, 2017	Jun 6, 2017	Jun 6, 2017		
Toy Soldiers 2: Finest Hour	Action; strategy; tower defense	Signal Studios	Signal Studios	TBA	TBA	TBA		
Toy Soldiers: Cold War HD	Action; strategy; tower defense	Signal Studios	Signal Studios	TBA	TBA	TBA		
Toy Soldiers HD	Action; strategy; tower defense	Signal Studios	Accelerate Games	Oct 20, 2021	Sep 9, 2021	Sep 9, 2021		
Toy Soldiers: War Chest	Action; strategy; tower defense	Signal Studios	Ubisoft	Aug 18, 2015	Aug 18, 2015	Aug 18, 2015		
TrackMania Turbo	Racing	Nadeo	Ubisoft	Mar 24, 2016	Mar 22, 2016	Mar 24, 2016	P VR	
Trailmakers	Physics based; vehicular sandbox	Flashbulb Games	JP: Exnoa; WW: Flashbulb Games	Dec 10, 2020	May 21, 2020	May 21, 2020		
Train Sim World	Simulation	Dovetail Games	Dovetail Games	Unreleased	Jul 24, 2018	Jul 24, 2018		
Train Sim World 2	Simulation	Dovetail Games	Dovetail Games	Unreleased	Aug 20, 2020	Aug 20, 2020		
Train Sim World 2020	Simulation	Dovetail Games	Dovetail Games	Unreleased	Aug 15, 2019	Aug 15, 2019		
Train Sim World: Long Island Rail Road	Simulation	Dovetail Games	Dovetail Games	Unreleased	Nov 27, 2018	Nov 27, 2018		
Transcripted	Shooter	Alkemi; Seaven Studio	Plug In Digital	Feb 7, 2018	Sep 13, 2017	Sep 12, 2017		
Transference	Adventure	Ubisoft; SpectreVision	Ubisoft	Sep 18, 2018	Sep 18, 2018	Sep 18, 2018		
Transformers: Battlegrounds	Tactical role-playing	Coatsink	Outright Games	Unreleased	Oct 23, 2020	Oct 23, 2020		
Transformers: Devastation	Action	PlatinumGames	Activision	Unreleased	Oct 6, 2015	Oct 9, 2015		
Transformers: Fall of Cybertron	Third-person shooter	High Moon Studios	Activision	Unreleased	Aug 9, 2016	Aug 9, 2016		
Transformers: Rise of the Dark Spark	Third-person shooter	Edge of Reality	Activision	Aug 28, 2014	Jun 24, 2014	Jun 24, 2014		
Transistor	Action role-playing	Supergiant Games	Supergiant Games	Apr 20, 2015	May 20, 2014	May 21, 2014		
Transport Giant	Simulation	Reactor Games	UIG Entertainment	Unreleased	Jul 11, 2017	Jul 11, 2017		
Travis Strikes Again: No More Heroes	Action-adventure; hack and slash	Grasshopper Manufacture	NA: Xseed Games; WW: Marvelous	Oct 17, 2019	Oct 17, 2019	Oct 17, 2019		
Treadnauts	Fighting	Topstitch Games	Topstitch Games	Aug 23, 2018	Aug 17, 2018	Aug 17, 2018		
Trials of Mana Remake	Action role-playing	Square Enix	Square Enix	Apr 24, 2020	Apr 24, 2020	Apr 24, 2020		
Trials Fusion	Racing; platform	RedLynx	Ubisoft	Apr 29, 2014	Apr 16, 2014	Apr 16, 2014		
Trials of the Blood Dragon	Platform	RedLynx	Ubisoft	Jun 16, 2016	Jun 16, 2016	Jun 16, 2016		
Trials Rising	Racing; platform	RedLynx	Ubisoft	Feb 28, 2019	Feb 26, 2019	Feb 26, 2019		
Tricky Towers	Party, puzzle	WeirdBeard	WeirdBeard	Oct 5, 2016	Aug 2, 2016	Aug 2, 2016		
Trine: Enchanted Edition	Platform; puzzle	Frozenbyte	Frozenbyte	Unreleased	Dec 23, 2014	Dec 17, 2014	3D	
Trine 2: Complete Story	Platform; puzzle	Frozenbyte	Frozenbyte	Jul 8, 2015	Nov 15, 2013	Nov 29, 2013	3D	
Trine 3: The Artifacts of Power	Platform; puzzle	Frozenbyte	Frozenbyte	Unreleased	Dec 22, 2015	Dec 16, 2015	3D	
Trine 4: The Nightmare Prince	Platform; puzzle	Frozenbyte	Modus Games	Oct 10, 2019	Oct 8, 2019	Oct 8, 2019		
Trivial Pursuit Live!	Board game	Longtail Studios	Ubisoft	Unreleased	Feb 17, 2015	Feb 18, 2015		
Tron RUN/r	Platform	Sanzaru Games	Disney Interactive	Unreleased	Feb 16, 2016	Feb 16, 2016		
Tropico 5	Simulation	Haemimont Games	JP: Square Enix; WW: Kalypso Media	Jun 25, 2015	Apr 24, 2015	Apr 25, 2015		
Tropico 6	Simulation	Limbic Entertainment	JP: Square Enix; WW: Kalypso Media	Sep 27, 2019	Sep 27, 2019	Sep 27, 2019		
Trover Saves the Universe	Adventure	Squanch Games	Squanch Games	Unreleased	May 31, 2019	May 31, 2019	VR	
Trüberbrook	Adventure	btf	Headup Games	Oct 24, 2019	Apr 17, 2019	Apr 17, 2019		
Truck Driver	Vehicle simulation game	Triangle Studios	Soedesco	Sep 19, 2019	Sep 19, 2019	Sep 19, 2019	P	
Tsukihime: A Piece of Blue Glass Moon	Visual novel	Type-Moon	Type-Moon	Aug 26, 2021	Unreleased	Unreleased		
TT Isle of Man: Ride on the Edge	Racing	Kylotonn	Bigben Interactive	Apr 19, 2018	Mar 13, 2018	Mar 13, 2018		
TT Isle of Man: Ride on the Edge 2	Racing	Kylotonn	Bigben Interactive	Unreleased	Mar 19, 2020	Mar 19, 2020		
TumbleSeed	Action; puzzle	Benedict Fritz	aeiowu	Unreleased	May 2, 2017	May 2, 2017		
Tumblestone	Puzzle	TQAG	TQAG	Unreleased	Jul 26, 2016	Jul 27, 2016		
Tunche	Beat 'em up	LEAP Game Studios	HypeTrain Digital	Unreleased	TBA	TBA		
The Turing Test	Adventure; puzzle	Bulkhead Interactive	Square Enix Collective	Unreleased	Jan 23, 2017	Jan 23, 2017		
Turrican Anthology Vol. I	Run and gun	Factor 5	Strictly Limited Games	TBA	TBA	TBA		
Turrican Anthology Vol. II	Run and gun	Factor 5	Strictly Limited Games	TBA	TBA	TBA		
Turrican Flashback	Run and gun	Factor 5	ININ Games	Unreleased	Dec 8, 2020	Dec 8, 2020		
Twin Mirror	Adventure	Dontnod Entertainment	Dontnod Entertainment	Unreleased	Dec 1, 2020	Dec 1, 2020		
Twin Robots	Platform	Thinice Games	Ratalaika Games	Jul 24, 2017	Oct 11, 2017	Oct 11, 2017		
Two Parsecs From Earth	Action, metroidvania	ABX Games Studios	Ratalaika Games	Unreleased	Oct 14, 2020	Oct 14, 2020		
Two Point Campus	Business simulation	Two Point Studios	Sega	Aug 9, 2022	Aug 9, 2022	Aug 9, 2022		
Two Point Hospital	Business simulation	Two Point Studios	Sega	Unreleased	Feb 25, 2020	Feb 25, 2020		
Ty the Tasmanian Tiger HD	Platform	Krome Studios	Krome Studios	Unreleased	Jul 25, 2020	Jul 25, 2020		
Ty the Tasmanian Tiger 2: Bush Rescue HD	Platform	Krome Studios	Krome Studios	Unreleased	Jun 30, 2021	Jun 30, 2021		
Type: Rider	Platform	Ex-Nihilo	Arte	Unreleased	Jul 12, 2016	Jul 12, 2016		
Typoman	Platform; puzzle	Brainseed Factory	Brainseed Factory	Jul 24, 2017	Feb 21, 2017	Feb 21, 2017		
Ultimate Chicken Horse	Platform	Clever Endeavour	Clever Endeavour	Dec 12, 2017	Dec 14, 2017	Dec 12, 2017	CP	
Ultimate Fishing Simulator	Fishing; simulation	Bit Golem; Console Labs	PlayWay	Unreleased	Dec 18, 2020	Dec 18, 2020		
Ultimate Fishing Simulator 2	Fishing; simulation	MasterCode	Ultimate Games	Unreleased	TBA	TBA		
Ultimate Marvel vs. Capcom 3	Fighting	Capcom / Eighting	Capcom	Dec 3, 2016	Dec 3, 2016	Dec 3, 2016		
Ultimate Racing 2D	Racing	Applimazing	Applimazing	Unreleased	Jul 20, 2020	Jul 20, 2020		
Ultra Hat Dimension	Puzzle	Kitsune Games	JP: Ratalaika Games; WW: Kitsune Games	Aug 20, 2020	Jul 14, 2020	Jul 15, 2020		
Ultra Street Fighter IV	Fighting	Other Ocean Interactive	Capcom	Sep 4, 2015	May 26, 2015	May 27, 2015		
Ultratron	Shoot 'em up	Puppy Games	Curve Digital	May 12, 2015	May 12, 2015	May 12, 2015		
Ultrawings Flat	Simulation	Bit Planet Games	Bit Planet Games	Unreleased	Apr 9, 2019	Apr 9, 2019		
Ultros	Metroidvania	Hadoque	Kepler Interactive	Feb 13, 2024	Feb 13, 2024	Feb 13, 2024		
Umbrella Corps	Action	Capcom	Capcom	Jun 21, 2016	Jun 21, 2016	Jun 21, 2016		
Umihara Kawase BaZooKa	Fighting	Studio Saizensen	JP: Success; WW: Inin Games	May 28, 2020	Sep 29, 2020	Sep 29, 2020		
Umihara Kawase Fresh!	Platform	Studio Saizensen	JP: Success; EU: Nicalis	Apr 23, 2020	Oct 30, 2020	May 15, 2020		
Umineko When They Cry	Visual novel	07th Expansion	Entergram	Jan 28, 2021	Unreleased	Unreleased		
Unbox: Newbie's Adventure	Adventure, platform	Prospect Games	Sold Out	Dec 22, 2017	Jul 25, 2017	Jul 26, 2017		
The Uncertain: Last Quiet Day	Adventure	New Game Order	New Game Order	Mar 3, 2022	Mar 3, 2022	Mar 3, 2022		
The Uncertain: Light at the End	Adventure	New Game Order	META Publishing	Unreleased	TBA	TBA		
Uncharted 4: A Thief's End	Action-adventure	Naughty Dog	Sony Interactive Entertainment	May 10, 2016	May 10, 2016	May 10, 2016	P	
Uncharted: The Lost Legacy	Action-adventure	Naughty Dog	Sony Interactive Entertainment	Sep 14, 2017	Aug 22, 2017	Aug 23, 2017	P	
Uncharted: The Nathan Drake Collection	Action-adventure	Naughty Dog	Sony Computer Entertainment	Oct 8, 2015	Oct 9, 2015	Oct 7, 2015		
Uncharted Tides: Port Royal	Puzzle; hidden object	Artifex Mundi	Artifex Mundi	Unreleased	Feb 18, 2020	Feb 18, 2020		
Uncharted Waters Online: Gran Atlas	MMORPG	Koei Tecmo	Koei Tecmo	Sep 15, 2015	Unreleased	Unreleased		
Undead Darlings: No Cure for Love	Role-playing	Mr. Tired Media	Sekai Games	Unreleased	Sep 28, 2020	Sep 28, 2020		
Undead Horde	Role-playing; real-time strategy	10tons	10tons	Unreleased	May 15, 2020	May 15, 2020	CB	
Underhero	Role-playing; Platform	Paper Castle; Stage Clear Studios	Digerati	Unreleased	Feb 11, 2020	Feb 12, 2020		
Undernauts: Labyrinth of Yomi	Role-playing	Experience	JP: Experience; WW: Aksys Games	Oct 15, 2020	Oct 28, 2021	Oct 28, 2021		
Under Night In-Birth Exe:Late cl-r	Fighting	French Bread	Aksys Games	Feb 20, 2020	Feb 21, 2020	Feb 20, 2020		
Under Night In-Birth Exe:Latest	Fighting	French Bread	Aksys Games	Jul 20, 2017	Jul 20, 2017	Jul 20, 2017		
Undertale	Role-playing	Toby Fox	8-4	Aug 16, 2017	Aug 15, 2017	Aug 15, 2017		
Undying	Survival	Vanimals	Vanimals	TBA	TBA	TBA		
Unepic	Platform; role-playing	EnjoyUp Games	EnjoyUp Games	Mar 29, 2016	Mar 29, 2016	Mar 29, 2016		
Unexplored	Roguelike	Ludomotion	Ludomotion	Unreleased	Feb 19, 2019	Feb 19, 2019		
Unexplored 2: The Wayfarer's Legacy	Roguelike	Ludomotion	Ludomotion	Unreleased	Sep 14, 2022	Sep 14, 2022		
The Unfinished Swan	Puzzle	Giant Sparrow	Sony Computer Entertainment	Oct 23, 2014	Oct 28, 2014	Oct 29, 2014		
Unholy Heights	Tower defense	Mebius	Teyon	Sep 13, 2016	Sep 13, 2016	Unreleased		
Uniform girlfriend 2	Adventure	Entergram	Entergram	Jan 23, 2025	Unreleased	Unreleased		
Unknown 9: Awakening	Action-adventure	Reflector Entertainment	Bandai Namco Entertainment	Oct 18, 2024	Oct 18, 2024	Oct 18, 2024		
Unmechanical: Extended	Platform; puzzle	Grip Games	Grip Games	Oct 21, 2015	Feb 10, 2015	Feb 11, 2015		
Uno	Card & board	Ubisoft Chengdu	Ubisoft	Aug 25, 2016	Aug 16, 2016	Aug 16, 2016	PL	
Uno Flip!	Card & board	Ubisoft Chengdu	Ubisoft	Mar 17, 2020	Mar 17, 2020	Mar 17, 2020		
Unrailed!	Action; party	Indoor Astronaut	Daedalic Entertainment	Sep 23, 2020	Sep 23, 2020	Sep 23, 2020		
Unravel	Puzzle-platform	ColdWood Interactive	Electronic Arts	Feb 9, 2016	Feb 9, 2016	Feb 9, 2016		
Unravel Two	Puzzle-platform	Coldwood Interactive	Electronic Arts	Jun 9, 2018	Jun 9, 2018	Jun 9, 2018		
Unruly Heroes	Platform	Magic Design Studios	Magic Design Studios	Jul 19, 2019	May 28, 2019	May 28, 2019		
Until Dawn	Interactive drama	Supermassive Games	Sony Computer Entertainment	Aug 27, 2015	Aug 25, 2015	Aug 26, 2015	C	
Until You Fall	Hack and slash, roguelite	Schell Games	Schell Games	Unreleased	Sep 29, 2020	Sep 29, 2020	VR	
Untitled Goose Game	Puzzle; stealth	House House	Panic	Dec 17, 2019	Dec 17, 2019	Dec 17, 2019		
Unto The End	Action-adventure	2 Ton Studios	Big Sugar	Unreleased	Dec 9, 2020	Dec 9, 2020		
Unturned	Survival	Smartly Dressed Games	505 Games	Unreleased	Nov 12, 2020	Nov 11, 2020		
unWorded	Puzzle	Bento Studio	Bento Studio	TBA	TBA	TBA		
Urban Legend in Limbo	Fighting	Twilight Frontier	Twilight Frontier	Dec 8, 2016	Unreleased	Unreleased		
Uppers	Beat 'em up	Honey∞Parade Games	Marvelous	TBA	Unreleased	Unreleased		
Use Your Words	Party	Smiling Buddha Games	Screenwave Media	Unreleased	Apr 4, 2017	Apr 4, 2017		
Utawarerumono: Mask of Deception	Tactical role-playing, visual novel	Aquaplus	NA: Atlus USA; EU: Deep Silver	Sep 24, 2015	May 23, 2017	May 23, 2017	CP	
Utawarerumono: Mask of Truth	Tactical role-playing, visual novel	Aquaplus	NA: Atlus USA; EU: Deep Silver	Sep 21, 2016	Sep 5, 2017	Sep 5, 2017	CP P	
Utawarerumono: Prelude to the Fallen	Tactical role-playing, visual novel	Aquaplus	NIS America	Apr 26, 2018	May 26, 2020	May 29, 2020		
Utawarerumono: Zan	Action, brawler	Aquaplus; Tamsoft	NIS America	Sep 27, 2018	Sep 10, 2019	Sep 13, 2019		
Utawarerumono: Zan 2	Action, brawler	Aquaplus	Aquaplus	Jul 22, 2021	TBA	TBA		
VA-11 Hall-A: Cyberpunk Bartender Action	Simulation, visual novel	Sukeban Games	Ysbryd Games	May 2, 2019	May 30, 2019	May 2, 2019		
Vagrus - The Riven Realms	Role-playing, strategy	Lost Pilgrims Studio	Lost Pilgrims Studio	Mar 31, 2025	Mar 31, 2025	Mar 31, 2025		
Valentino Rossi: The Game	Racing	Milestone srl	Milestone srl	Sep 21, 2016	Aug 16, 2016	Jun 16, 2016		
Valfaris	Action; platform	Steel Mantis	JP: EastAsiaSoft; WW: Digital Uppercut	Jan 23, 2020	Nov 5, 2019	Nov 6, 2019		
Valhalla Hills: Definitive Edition	Adventure; puzzle	Daedalic Entertainment	Kalypso	Apr 28, 2017	Apr 28, 2017	Apr 28, 2017		
Valiant Hearts: The Great War	Adventure, puzzle	Ubisoft Montpellier	Ubisoft	Jul 31, 2014	Jun 25, 2014	Jun 25, 2014		
Valkyria Chronicles 4	Tactical role-playing	Sega	Sega	Mar 21, 2018	Sep 25, 2018	Sep 25, 2018	P	
Valkyria Chronicles Remastered	Tactical role-playing	Media.Vision	Sega	Feb 10, 2016	May 17, 2016	May 17, 2016		
Valkyria Revolution	Tactical role-playing	Media.Vision	Sega	Jan 19, 2017	Jun 27, 2017	Jun 30, 2017		
Valley	Action-adventure	Blue Isle Studios	Blue Isle Studios	Unreleased	Aug 23, 2016	Aug 23, 2016		
Vanquish	Action; third-person shooter	PlatinumGames	Sega	May 28, 2020	Feb 18, 2020	Feb 18, 2020	P	
Vambrace: Cold Soul	Adventure	Devespresso Games	Headup Games	Aug 29, 2019	Aug 29, 2019	Aug 29, 2019		
Vampire: The Masquerade – Bloodlines 2	Action role-playing	Hardsuit Labs	Paradox Interactive	TBA	TBA	TBA		
Vampire: The Masquerade – Coteries of New York	Adventure	Draw Distance	Draw Distance	Nov 12, 2020	Mar 25, 2020	Mar 25, 2020		
Vampire: The Masquerade – Shadows of New York	Visual novel	Draw Distance	Draw Distance	Unreleased	Sep 10, 2020	Sep 10, 2020		
Vampire: The Masquerade – Swansong	Action role-playing	Big Bad Wolf	Nacon	Aug 17, 2022	May 19, 2022	May 19, 2022		
Vampyr	Action role-playing	Dontnod Entertainment	Focus Home Interactive	Jun 5, 2018	Jun 5, 2018	Jun 5, 2018		
Vane	Adventure	Friend & Foe Games	Friend & Foe Games	Jan 15, 2019	Jan 15, 2019	Jan 15, 2019	P	
The Vanishing of Ethan Carter	Puzzle	The Astronauts	The Astronauts	Jul 15, 2015	Jul 15, 2015	Jul 15, 2015		
Vaporum	Role-playing	Fatbot Games	Merge Games	Oct 10, 2019	Apr 9, 2019	Apr 15, 2019		
Vaporum: Lockdown	Role-playing	Fatbot Games	Fatbot Games	Dec 9, 2021	Dec 9, 2021	Dec 9, 2021		
Vasara Collection	Arcade; shoot 'em up	QUByte Interactive	QUByte Interactive	Nov 24, 2019	Aug 13, 2019	Aug 13, 2019		
Vaster Claws III: Dragon Slayer of the God World ~Offline Ver.	Role-playing	StudioGIW	Mediascape	Sep 25, 2020	Unreleased	Unreleased		
Vegas Tales	Unique; Casual; Simulation	FMV Interactive	FMV Interactive	Unreleased	Feb 10, 2022	Feb 10, 2022		
Velocity 2X	Shoot 'em up	FuturLab	FuturLab	Sep 3, 2014	Sep 2, 2014	Sep 3, 2014		
Venture Towns	City-building; simulation	Kairosoft	Kairosoft	May 14, 2020	Unreleased	Unreleased		
Venus Vacation Prism: Dead or Alive Xtreme	Dating sim	Team Ninja	Koei Tecmo	Mar 6, 2025	Unreleased	Unreleased		
Vera Blanc: Full Moon	Visual novel	Winter Wolves	Ratalaika Games	Unreleased	Nov 10, 2020	Nov 11, 2020		
Verdun	First-person shooter	M2H; Blackmill Games	M2H; Blackmill Games	Aug 30, 2016	Aug 30, 2016	Aug 30, 2016	CP P	
VEV: Viva Ex Vivo	Adventure; survival	Truant Pixel	Truant Pixel	Unreleased	May 17, 2016	May 17, 2016	VR	
Victor Vran	Action role-playing	Haemimont Games	Haemimont Games	Feb 14, 2019	Jun 6, 2017	Jun 6, 2017	P	
Videoball	Sports	Action Button Entertainment	Iron Galaxy	Jul 12, 2016	Jul 12, 2016	Jul 12, 2016		
Vigil: The Longest Night	Action; platform	Glass Heart Games	Another Indie	TBA	TBA	TBA		
Viking Squad	Beat 'em up; role-playing	Slick Entertainment	Slick Entertainment	Unreleased	Oct 4, 2016	Oct 10, 2016	P	
Vikings: Wolves of Midgard	Action role-playing	Games Farm	Kalypso Media	Mar 24, 2017	Mar 24, 2017	Mar 24, 2017	P	
Virginia	Adventure	Variable State	505 Games	Sep 22, 2016	Sep 22, 2016	Sep 22, 2016		
Virtua Fighter 5: Ultimate Showdown	Fighting	Ryu Ga Gotoku Studio; Sega AM2	Sega	Jun 1, 2021	Jun 1, 2021	Jun 1, 2021		
Virtuous Western	Puzzle Platformer	Ratalaika Games	Ratalaika Games	Sep 2, 2021	Sep 2, 2021	Sep 2, 2021		
Virtual Ties Isekaijoucho Träumerei	Adventure	Entergram	Kamitsubaki Studio	Mar 18, 2026	Mar 18, 2026	Mar 18, 2026		
Visage	Survival horror	SadSquare Studio	SadSquare Studio	Dec 17, 2020	Oct 30, 2020	Oct 30, 2020		
Visions of Mana	Action role-playing	Ouka Studios	Square Enix	Jul 30, 2024	Aug 29, 2024	Aug 29, 2024		
VizionEck Cube Royale	First-person shooter	VizionEck	VizionEck	TBA	TBA	TBA		
Voice of Cards: The Forsaken Maiden	Role-playing	Alim	Square Enix	Feb 17, 2022	Feb 17, 2022	Feb 17, 2022		
Voice of Cards: The Isle Dragon Roars	Role-playing	Alim	Square Enix	Oct 28, 2021	Oct 28, 2021	Oct 28, 2021		
Void Bastards	First person shooter; roguelike	Blue Munchu	Humble Bundle	Unreleased	May 7, 2020	May 7, 2020		
Void Terrarium	Role-playing; roguelike	Nippon Ichi Software	Nippon Ichi Software	Jan 23, 2020	Jul 14, 2020	Jul 10, 2020		
Volgarr the Viking	Platform	Crazy Viking Studios	Crazy Viking Studios	Nov 16, 2016	Nov 16, 2016	Nov 16, 2016		
Volgarr the Viking II	Platform	Crazy Viking Studios	Digital Eclipse	Aug 6, 2024	Aug 6, 2024	Aug 6, 2024		
Volume	Stealth	Mike Bithell Games	Mike Bithell Games	Aug 10, 2016	Aug 18, 2015	Aug 19, 2015	VR	
V-Rally 4	Racing	Kylotonn	Bigben Interactive	Apr 11, 2019	Sep 11, 2018	Sep 6, 2018	P	
VVVtunia	Role-playing	Compile Heart	Idea Factory	Aug 6, 2020	Mar 2, 2021	Mar 5, 2021		
VVVVVV	2D platform	Terry Cavanagh	Nicalis	Unreleased	Aug 25, 2015	Aug 26, 2015		
The Walking Dead: Michonne	Graphic adventure	Telltale Games	Telltale Games	Feb 23, 2016	Feb 23, 2016	Feb 23, 2016		
The Walking Dead: Season One	Graphic adventure	Telltale Games	Telltale Games	Sep 12, 2014	Oct 14, 2014	Oct 31, 2014		
The Walking Dead: Season Two	Graphic adventure	Telltale Games	Telltale Games	Oct 31, 2014	Oct 21, 2014	Oct 31, 2014		
The Walking Dead: Season Three	Graphic adventure	Telltale Games	Telltale Games	Dec 20, 2016	Dec 20, 2016	Dec 20, 2016		
The Walking Dead: The Final Season	Graphic adventure	Telltale Games	Telltale Games	Aug 14, 2018	Aug 14, 2018	Aug 14, 2018		
Wand Wars	Fighting; party	Moonradish	Moonradish	Unreleased	Sep 28, 2016	Unreleased		
Wandersong	Adventure; puzzle	Greg Lobanov	Humble Bundle	Jan 22, 2019	Jan 22, 2019	Jan 22, 2019		
War Mongrels	Real-time tactics	Destructive Creations	All in! Games	TBA	TBA	TBA		
Warborn	Turn-based tactics	Raredrop Games	PQube	Unreleased	Jun 12, 2020	Jun 12, 2020		
Warface: Breakout	Tactical shooter	Crytek Kiev	My.com	Unreleased	May 26, 2020	May 26, 2020		
Warframe	Third-person shooter	Digital Extremes	Digital Extremes	Feb 22, 2014	Nov 15, 2013	Nov 29, 2013		
Wargroove	Turn-based tactics	Chucklefish	Chucklefish	Jul 23, 2019	Jul 23, 2019	Jul 23, 2019		
Warhammer 40,000: Battlesector	Turn-based tactics	Black Lab Games	Slitherine Software	Unreleased	Dec 2, 2021	Dec 2, 2021		
Warhammer 40,000: Deathwatch Tyranids Invasion	Turn-based strategy	Rodeo Games	Funbox Media	Unreleased	Feb 24, 2017	Feb 24, 2017		
Warhammer 40,000: Inquisitor – Martyr	Action role-playing	NeocoreGames	Bigben Interactive	Dec 20, 2018	Aug 23, 2018	Aug 23, 2018		
Warhammer 40,000: Mechanicus	Turn-based strategy	Bulwark Studios	Kasedo Games	Unreleased	Jul 17, 2020	Jul 17, 2020		
Warhammer 40,000: Space Wolf	Turn-based strategy	HeroCraft	HeroCraft	Unreleased	Mar 26, 2019	Mar 29, 2019		
Warhammer Age of Sigmar: Storm Ground	Turn-based strategy	Gastket Games	Focus Home Interactive	Unreleased	May 27, 2021	May 27, 2021		
Warhammer: Chaosbane	Action role-playing	Eko Software	Bigben Interactive	Jan 30, 2020	Jun 4, 2019	Jun 4, 2019		
Warhammer: End Times – Vermintide	Action	Fatshark	Fatshark	Oct 4, 2016	Oct 4, 2016	Oct 4, 2016		
Warhammer Quest	Role-playing	Rodeo Games	Chilled Mouse	Unreleased	Feb 21, 2017	Feb 21, 2017		
Warhammer Quest 2: The End Times	Role-playing	Rodeo Games	Chilled Mouse	Unreleased	Dec 20, 2019	Jan 6, 2020		
Warhammer: Vermintide 2	First-person shooter	Fatshark	Fatshark	Unreleased	Dec 18, 2018	Dec 18, 2018		
Warlock's Tower	Puzzle	Midipixel	Ratalaika Games	Aug 7, 2020	May 28, 2019	May 29, 2019		
Warparty	Real-time strategy	Crazy Monkey Studios	Crazy Monkey Studios	Jul 9, 2020	Mar 28, 2019	Mar 28, 2019		
Warriors All-Stars	Action; hack and slash	Omega Force	Koei Tecmo	Mar 30, 2017	Aug 29, 2017	Sep 1, 2017		
Warriors Orochi 3 Ultimate	Hack and slash	Omega Force	Koei Tecmo	Jun 26, 2014	Sep 2, 2014	Sep 4, 2014	CP	
Warriors Orochi 4	Hack and slash	Omega Force	Koei Tecmo	Sep 27, 2018	Oct 16, 2018	Oct 19, 2018		
Warriors Orochi 4 Ultimate	Hack and slash	Omega Force	Koei Tecmo	Dec 19, 2019	Feb 14, 2020	Feb 14, 2020		
Warsaw	Tactical role-playing	Crunching Koalas; Pixelated Milk	Gaming Company	Unreleased	Sep 29, 2020	Sep 29, 2020		
Wartile	Strategy	Playwood Project	Deck13	Unreleased	Mar 24, 2020	Mar 24, 2020		
Wasteland 2: Director's Cut	Role-playing	Obsidian Entertainment	inXile Entertainment	Oct 16, 2015	Oct 13, 2015	Oct 16, 2015		
Wasteland 3	Role-playing	inXile Entertainment	inXile Entertainment	Unreleased	Aug 28, 2020	Aug 28, 2020		
Watch Dogs	Action-adventure	Ubisoft Montreal	Ubisoft	Jun 26, 2014	May 27, 2014	May 27, 2014		
Watch Dogs 2	Action-adventure	Ubisoft Montreal	Ubisoft	Nov 15, 2016	Nov 15, 2016	Nov 15, 2016	P	
Watch Dogs: Legion	Action-adventure	Ubisoft Toronto	Ubisoft	Oct 29, 2020	Oct 29, 2020	Oct 29, 2020	CB P	
Wattam	Action	Funomena	Annapurna Interactive	Dec 17, 2019	Dec 17, 2019	Dec 17, 2019		
Way of Redemption	Action; sports	Pixel Cream	Pixel Cream	Unreleased	Nov 7, 2017	Unreleased	CP	
We Happy Few	Adventure	Compulsion Games	Gearbox Publishing	Apr 13, 2018	Apr 13, 2018	Apr 13, 2018		
We Love Katamari Reroll+ Royal Reverie	Puzzle, Action	Monkey Craft	Bandai Namco	Jun 2, 2022	Jun 2, 2022	Jun 2, 2022		
We. The Revolution	Adventure	Klabater	Poluslash	Unreleased	Jun 25, 2019	Jun 25, 2019		
WeakWood Throne	Action role-playing	Drageus Games	Drageus Games	Unreleased	Sep 2, 2021	Sep 2, 2021		
The Welkin World: Rebels	Action	Impermanence Studio	Impermanence Studio	TBA	TBA	TBA		
Went: Refactor	Visual novel	Soul Smelt Studio	Indienova	TBA	TBA	TBA		
Werewolf: The Apocalypse – Earthblood	Action role-playing	Cyanide Studio	Nacon	Feb 4, 2021	Feb 4, 2021	Feb 4, 2021		
West of Dead	Twin-stick shooter	Upstream Arcade	Raw Fury	Aug 28, 2020	Jun 8, 2020	Jun 8, 2020		
What Lies in the Multiverse	Adventure	Studio Voyager; IguanaBee	Untold Tales	Unreleased	Mar 3, 2022	Mar 3, 2022		
What Remains of Edith Finch	Open world, puzzle	Giant Sparrow	Annapurna Interactive	Apr 25, 2017	Apr 25, 2017	Apr 25, 2017		
Wheels of Aurelia	Action	Santa Ragione	MixedBag	Unreleased	Oct 4, 2016	Oct 5, 2016	P	
Wheel of Fortune	Card & Board	Frima Studios	Ubisoft	Unreleased	Nov 7, 2017	Nov 7, 2017		
Where The Heart Leads	Adventure	Armature Studio	Armature Studio	Jul 13, 2021	Jul 13, 2021	Jul 13, 2021		
When the Past Was Around	Point and click adventure	Mojiken	Chorus Worldwide	Dec 16, 2020	Dec 17, 2020	Dec 17, 2020		
Where the Water Tastes Like Wine	Adventure	Dim Bulb Games	Serenity Forge	Unreleased	Dec 2, 2019	Nov 29, 2019		
Whispering Willows	Platform	Night Light Interactive	Loot Interactive	Unreleased	Jun 30, 2015	Jun 30, 2015		
White Day: A Labyrinth Named School	Survival horror	Arc System Works	ROI Games	Aug 24, 2017	Aug 22, 2017	Aug 29, 2017		
White Night	Puzzle, survival horror	OSome Studio	Activision	Unreleased	Mar 4, 2015	Mar 4, 2015		
White Noise 2	Horror	Milkstone Studios	Milkstone Studios	Unreleased	Oct 13, 2017	Oct 13, 2017		
Who Wants to Be a Millionaire?	Card & Board; trivia	Appeal Studios	Microids	Unreleased	Nov 17, 2020	Oct 29, 2020		
Wild	Action-adventure	Wild Sheep Studio	Sony Interactive Entertainment	TBA	TBA	TBA		
The Wild Eight	Survival	HypeTrain Digital	HypeTrain Digital	Unreleased	Oct 27, 2020	Oct 27, 2020		
Wildfire	Stealth	Sneaky Bastards	Humble Games	Dec 3, 2020	Dec 3, 2020	Dec 3, 2020		
Wild Guns Reloaded	Shooter	Natsume Atari	JP: Natsume Atari; WW: Natsume Inc.	Dec 13, 2016	Dec 20, 2016	Dec 20, 2016		
Will: A Wonderful World	Visual novel	WMY Studio	JP: Playism; WW: PM Studios	Nov 15, 2018	Jul 23, 2019	Nov 8, 2019		
Willy Jetman: Astromonkey's Revenge	Shooter	Badland Games	Badland Games	Unreleased	Jan 31, 2020	Jan 31, 2020		
Windbound	Adventure; survival	5 Lives Studios	Deep Silver	Sep 11, 2020	Sep 11, 2020	Sep 11, 2020		
Windlands	Adventure	Psytec Games Limited	Psytec Games Limited	Jun 30, 2017	Oct 25, 2016	Jan 24, 2017		
Windjammers	Fighting, sports	DotEmu	DotEmu	Aug 29, 2017	Aug 29, 2017	Aug 29, 2017		
Windjammers 2	Fighting, sports	DotEmu	DotEmu	Jan 20, 2022	Jan 20, 2022	Jan 20, 2022		
Wing of Darkness	Shoot 'em up	Production Exabilities	Clouded Leopard Entertainment	Jun 3, 2021	Jun 3, 2021	Jun 3, 2021		
Wingspan	Strategy	Monster Couch	Monster Couch	Oct 11, 2024	Oct 11, 2024	Oct 11, 2024		
Winning Post 8 2016	Sports	Tecmo Koei	Tecmo Koei	Mar 31, 2016	Unreleased	Unreleased		
Winning Post 8 2017	Sports	Koei Tecmo	Koei Tecmo	Mar 2, 2017	Unreleased	Unreleased		
Winning Post 8 2018	Sports	Koei Tecmo	Koei Tecmo	Mar 15, 2018	Unreleased	Unreleased		
Winning Post 9	Sports	Koei Tecmo	Koei Tecmo	Mar 28, 2019	Unreleased	Unreleased		
Winning Post 9 2020	Sports	Koei Tecmo	Koei Tecmo	Mar 12, 2020	Unreleased	Unreleased		
Winning Post 9 2021	Sports	Koei Tecmo	Koei Tecmo	Apr 15, 2021	Unreleased	Unreleased		
Winning Post 9 2022	Sports	Koei Tecmo	Koei Tecmo	Apr 14, 2022	Unreleased	Unreleased		
Wintermoor Tactics Club	Tactical role-playing	EVC	Versus Evil	Unreleased	Sep 10, 2020	Sep 10, 2020		
The Witch and the Hundred Knight	Action role-playing	Nippon Ichi Software	Nippon Ichi Software	Sep 25, 2015	Mar 1, 2016	Mar 4, 2016		
The Witch and the Hundred Knight 2	Action role-playing	Nippon Ichi Software	Nippon Ichi Software	Feb 23, 2017	Mar 27, 2018	Mar 30, 2018	P	
The Witcher 3: Wild Hunt	Action role-playing	CD Projekt Red	CD Projekt Red	May 19, 2015	May 19, 2015	May 19, 2015	CB P	
Wipeout Omega Collection	Racing	Sony XDev Europe	Sony Interactive Entertainment	Jun 6, 2017	Jun 6, 2017	Jun 6, 2017	P VR	
Witch on the Holy Night	Visual novel	Type-Moon	Aniplex	Dec 8, 2022	Dec 8, 2022	Dec 8, 2022		
The Witness	Adventure, puzzle	Thekla	Thekla	Jan 26, 2016	Jan 26, 2016	Jan 26, 2016	P	
Wizard of Legend	Dungeon crawler; roguelike	Contingent99	Humble Bundle	May 15, 2018	May 15, 2018	May 15, 2018		
The Wolf Among Us	Graphic adventure	Telltale Games	Telltale Games	Unreleased	Nov 4, 2014	Nov 7, 2014		
The Wolf Among Us 2	Graphic adventure	Telltale Games; AdHoc Studio	Telltale Games	TBA	TBA	TBA		
Wolfenstein: The New Order	First-person shooter	MachineGames	Bethesda Softworks	Jun 5, 2014	May 20, 2014	May 23, 2014		
Wolfenstein: The Old Blood	First-person shooter	MachineGames	Bethesda Softworks	May 28, 2015	May 5, 2015	May 5, 2015		
Wolfenstein: Youngblood	First-person shooter	MachineGames	Bethesda Softworks	Jul 26, 2019	Jul 26, 2019	Jul 26, 2019		
Wolfenstein II: The New Colossus	First-person shooter	MachineGames	Bethesda Softworks	Oct 27, 2017	Oct 27, 2017	Oct 27, 2017	P	
Wonder Blade	Beat 'em up	East2WestGames	East2WestGames	TBA	TBA	TBA		
Wonder Boy: Asha in Monster World	Action-adventure; platform	Artdink	JP: G Choice; WW: Inin Games	Apr 22, 2021	May 28, 2021	May 28, 2021		
Wonder Boy: The Dragon's Trap	Action-adventure; platform	Lizardcube	DotEmu	Apr 18, 2017	Apr 18, 2017	Apr 18, 2017		
Wonder Boy Returns Remix	Action-adventure; platform	CFK	CFK	Aug 9, 2019	Aug 8, 2019	Aug 8, 2019		
The Wonderful 101: Remastered	Action-adventure; hack and slash	PlatinumGames	PlatinumGames	Jun 11, 2020	May 19, 2020	May 22, 2020	P	
Wordhunters	Trivia	thumbfood	thumbfood	Unreleased	Nov 15, 2018	Nov 14, 2018	PL	
World Cruise Story	Simulation	Kairosoft	Kairosoft	Oct 29, 2020	Oct 30, 2020	Nov 11, 2020		
World End Syndrome	Visual novel	Toybox	WW: Arc System Works; EU: PQube	Aug 30, 2018	May 2, 2019	Jun 14, 2019		
World of Final Fantasy	Role-playing	Square Enix	Square Enix	Oct 27, 2016	Oct 25, 2016	Oct 28, 2016	P	
World of Van Helsing: Deathtrap	Tower defense; role-playing	NeocoreGames	NeocoreGames	Dec 6, 2020	Sep 29, 2020	Sep 28, 2020	P	
World of Warriors	Action	Saber Interactive	Sony Interactive Entertainment	Unreleased	Mar 21, 2018	Mar 21, 2018		
World to the West	Action-adventure	Rain Games	Rain Games	Unreleased	May 5, 2017	May 5, 2017		
World War Z	Third-person shooter	Saber Interactive	JP: H2 Interactive; WW: Focus Home Interactive	Sep 26, 2019	Apr 16, 2019	Apr 16, 2019	CP P	
World War Z: Aftermath	First-person shooter	Saber Interactive	Saber Interactive	Dec 22, 2021	Sep 21, 2021	Sep 21, 2021		
Worms Battlegrounds	Artillery; strategy; turn-based	Team17	Team17	Unreleased	May 3, 2014	May 30, 2014		
Worms Rumble	Battle royale; artillery; strategy	Team17	Team17	Dec 1, 2020	Dec 1, 2020	Dec 1, 2020	CB CP P	
Worms W.M.D	Artillery; strategy; turn-based	Team17	Team17	Aug 23, 2016	Aug 23, 2016	Aug 23, 2016		
Worse Than Death	Adventure; horror	Benjamin Rivers	Benjamin Rivers	Unreleased	Oct 8, 2019	Oct 8, 2019		
Wrath: Aeon of Ruin	First-person shooter	KillPixel Games	3D Realms; 1C Entertainment	Unreleased	Feb 25, 2021	Feb 25, 2021		
WRC 5	Racing; simulation	Kylotonn	Bigben Interactive	Oct 13, 2015	Oct 13, 2015	Oct 13, 2015		
WRC 6	Racing; simulation	Kylotonn	Bigben Interactive	Oct 7, 2016	Oct 7, 2016	Oct 7, 2016		
WRC 7	Racing; simulation	Kylotonn	Bigben Interactive	Oct 3, 2017	Oct 3, 2017	Oct 3, 2017	P	
WRC 8	Racing; simulation	Kylotonn	Bigben Interactive	Feb 6, 2020	Sep 10, 2019	Sep 5, 2019	P	
WRC 9	Racing; simulation	Kylotonn	Bigben Interactive	Unreleased	Sep 1, 2020	Sep 3, 2020	CB P	
WRC 10	Racing; simulation	Kylotonn	Nacon	Unreleased	Sep 2, 2021	Sep 2, 2021		
Wreckfest	Racing; vehicular combat	Bugbear Entertainment	THQ Nordic	Dec 19, 2019	Aug 27, 2019	Aug 27, 2019	P	
Wulverblade	Brawler, sidescroller	Darkwind Media	Darkwind Media	Jan 31, 2018	Jan 31, 2018	Jan 31, 2018		
Wuppo	Platform	Knuist & Perzik	Soedesco	Nov 17, 2017	Nov 17, 2017	Nov 17, 2017		
WWII Tank Battle Arena	Shooter game	Pix Arts	Pix Arts	Dec 9, 2022	Dec 9, 2022	Sep 12, 2022		
WWE 2K15	Sports	Yukes; Visual Concepts	2K Sports	Unreleased	Nov 18, 2014	Nov 21, 2014		
WWE 2K16	Sports	Yukes; Visual Concepts	2K Sports	Unreleased	Oct 27, 2015	Oct 27, 2015		
WWE 2K17	Sports	Yukes; Visual Concepts	2K Sports	Mar 9, 2017	Oct 11, 2016	Oct 11, 2016		
WWE 2K18	Sports	Yukes; Visual Concepts	2K Sports	Oct 17, 2017	Oct 17, 2017	Oct 17, 2017		
WWE 2K19	Sports	Yukes; Visual Concepts	2K Sports	Oct 9, 2018	Oct 9, 2018	Oct 9, 2018	P	
WWE 2K20	Sports	Visual Concepts	2K Sports	Oct 22, 2019	Oct 22, 2019	Oct 22, 2019	P	
WWE 2K22	Sports	Visual Concepts	2K Sports	Mar 11, 2022	Mar 11, 2022	Mar 11, 2022	P	
WWE 2K23	Sports	Visual Concepts	2K Sports	Mar 14, 2023	Mar 14, 2023	Mar 14, 2023	P	
WWE 2K24	Sports	Visual Concepts	2K Sports	Mar 8, 2024	Mar 8, 2024	Mar 8, 2024	P	
WWE 2K25	Sports	Visual Concepts	2K Sports	Mar 14, 2025	Mar 14, 2025	Mar 14, 2025		
WWE 2K Battlegrounds	Sports	Saber Interactive	2K Sports	Sep 18, 2020	Sep 18, 2020	Sep 18, 2020		
XCOM 2	Turn-based tactics	Firaxis Games	Take-Two Interactive	Sep 27, 2016	Sep 30, 2016	Sep 27, 2016	P	
Xeno Crisis	Top-down shooter	Bitmap Bureau	Bitmap Bureau	Sep 17, 2020	Oct 28, 2019	Oct 28, 2019		
Xenon Racer	Racing	3D Clouds	Soedesco	Jul 26, 2019	Mar 26, 2019	Mar 26, 2019		
Xenon Valkyrie+	Roguelite	CowCat	CowCat	Unreleased	Feb 20, 2018	Feb 20, 2018		
Xenoraid	Shoot 'em up	10tons	10tons	Nov 8, 2016	Nov 8, 2016	Nov 8, 2016		
XenoRaptor	Shoot 'em up	Peter Cleary	Digerati	Unreleased	Dec 17, 2019	Dec 18, 2019		
Xeodrifter	Metroidvania	Renegade Kid	Gambitious Digital	Jan 6, 2016	Sep 1, 2015	Sep 1, 2015		
XIII	First-person shooter; stealth	PlayMagic	Microids	Unreleased	Nov 10, 2020	Nov 10, 2020		
Xing: The Land Beyond	Puzzle	White Lotus	White Lotus	Unreleased	Feb 12, 2018	Feb 13, 2018	VR	
X-Morph: Defense	Shooter; strategy; tower defense	Exor Studios	Exor Studios	Aug 30, 2017	Aug 30, 2017	Aug 30, 2017		
Xuan-Yuan Sword 7	Action role-playing	Softstar Entertainment	Softstar Entertainment	Dec 10, 2020	TBA	TBA		
Yaga	Action role-playing	Breadcrumbs Interactive	Versus Evil	Nov 12, 2019	Nov 11, 2019	Nov 12, 2019		
Yakuza 0	Action-adventure	Ryu Ga Gotoku Studio	Sega	Mar 12, 2015	Jan 24, 2017	Jan 24, 2017		
Yakuza 3	Action-adventure	Ryu Ga Gotoku Studio	Sega	Aug 9, 2018	Aug 20, 2019	Aug 20, 2019	P	
Yakuza 4	Action-adventure	Ryu Ga Gotoku Studio	Sega	Jan 17, 2019	Oct 29, 2019	Oct 29, 2019	P	
Yakuza 5	Action-adventure	Ryu Ga Gotoku Studio	Sega	Jun 20, 2019	Feb 11, 2020	Feb 11, 2020	P	
Yakuza 6: The Song of Life	Action-adventure	Ryu Ga Gotoku Studio	Sega	Dec 8, 2016	Mar 20, 2018	Mar 20, 2018	P	
Yakuza Ishin	Action-adventure	Ryu Ga Gotoku Studio	Sega	Feb 22, 2014	Unreleased	Unreleased		
Yakuza Kiwami	Action	Ryu Ga Gotoku Studio	Sega	Jan 21, 2016	Aug 29, 2017	Aug 29, 2017		
Yakuza Kiwami 2	Action-adventure	Ryu Ga Gotoku Studio	Sega	Dec 17, 2017	Aug 28, 2018	Aug 28, 2018	P	
Yakuza: Like a Dragon	Role-playing	Ryu Ga Gotoku Studio	Sega	Jan 16, 2020	Nov 10, 2020	Nov 10, 2020	CB P	
The Yakuza Remastered Collection	Action-adventure	Ryu Ga Gotoku Studio	Sega	Feb 11, 2020	Feb 11, 2020	Feb 11, 2020		
Yars Rising	Platform	WayForward	Atari	Sep 10, 2024	Sep 10, 2024	Sep 10, 2024		
Yeah! You Want "Those Games," Right? So Here You Go! Now, Let's See You Clear Them!	Puzzle; Parody	Monkeycraft Co. Ltd.	D3 Publisher	Unreleased	Jan 11, 2024	Jan 11, 2024		
Yeah! You Want "Those Games," Right? So Here You Go! Now, Let's See You Clear Them! 2	Puzzle; Parody	Monkeycraft Co. Ltd.	D3 Publisher	Unreleased	Jul 17, 2024	Jul 17, 2024		
Yesterday Origins	Adventure	Pendulo Studios	Anuman	Unreleased	Nov 17, 2016	Nov 21, 2016		
YesterMorrow	Puzzle-platform	Bitmap Galaxy	Blowfish Studios	Unreleased	Nov 5, 2020	Nov 5, 2020		
Yo-kai Watch 4++	Role-playing	Level-5	Level-5	Dec 5, 2019	Unreleased	Unreleased		
Yo-kai Watch Jam: Yo-kai Academy Y	Role-playing	Level-5	Level-5	Oct 29, 2020	Unreleased	Unreleased		
Yoku's Island Express	Adventure; platform; pinball	Villa Gorilla	Team17	May 29, 2018	May 29, 2018	May 29, 2018		
Yomawari 3	Survival horror	Nippon Ichi Software	Nippon Ichi Software	Apr 21, 2022	Unreleased	Unreleased		
Yomawari: Midnight Shadows	Survival horror	Nippon Ichi Software	NIS America	Aug 24, 2017	Oct 24, 2017	Oct 27, 2017	P	
Yonder: The Cloud Catcher Chronicles	Role-playing	Prideful Sloth	Prideful Sloth	Feb 22, 2018	Jul 18, 2017	Jul 18, 2017		
Yooka-Laylee	3D platform	Playtonic Games	Team17	Apr 11, 2017	Apr 11, 2017	Apr 11, 2017		
Yooka-Laylee and the Impossible Lair	3D platform	Playtonic Games	Team17	Oct 8, 2019	Oct 8, 2019	Oct 8, 2019		
Ys: Memories of Celceta	Action role-playing	Nihon Falcom	JP: Nihon Falcom; WW: Xseed Games	May 16, 2019	Jun 9, 2020	Jun 19, 2020	P	
Ys Origin	Action role-playing	Nihon Falcom	JP: Nihon Falcom; WW: Xseed Games	Feb 21, 2017	Feb 21, 2017	Feb 21, 2017		
Ys VIII: Lacrimosa of Dana	Action role-playing	Nihon Falcom	JP: Nihon Falcom; WW: NIS America	May 25, 2017	Sep 12, 2017	Sep 15, 2017	P	
Ys IX: Monstrum Nox	Action role-playing	Nihon Falcom	JP: Nihon Falcom; WW: NIS America	Sep 26, 2019	Feb 2, 2021	Feb 5, 2021		
Ys X: Nordics	Action role-playing	Nihon Falcom	JP: Nihon Falcom; WW: NIS America	Sep 28, 2023	Sep 25, 2024	Oct 25, 2024		
Yu-Gi-Oh! Legacy of the Duelist	Card battle	Other Ocean Interactive	Konami	Unreleased	Jul 31, 2015	Jul 31, 2015		
Yu-Gi-Oh! Legacy of the Duelist: Link Evolution	Card battle	Konami	Konami	Mar 24, 2020	Mar 24, 2020	Mar 24, 2020		
Yu-Gi-Oh! Master Duel	Card battle	Konami	Konami	TBA	TBA	TBA		
Yumeutsutsu Re:After	Visual novel	Kogado Studio	Degica Games	Apr 23, 2020	Jul 23, 2020	Apr 24, 2020		
Yumeutsutsu Re:Master	Visual novel	Kogado Studio	Degica Games	Jun 13, 2019	Jul 23, 2020	Apr 24, 2020		
YU-NO: A Girl Who Chants Love at the Bound of this World	Visual novel	5pb.	5pb.	Mar 16, 2017	Oct 1, 2019	Oct 4, 2019		
Yuoni	Survival horror	Tricore	Chorus Worldwide	Aug 19, 2021	Aug 19, 2021	Aug 19, 2021		
Yurukill: The Calumniation Games	Shoot 'em up	G.Rev	JP: Izanagi Games; WW: NIS America	Apr 14, 2022	Jun 7, 2022	Jun 10, 2022		
Zanki Zero: Last Beginning	Role-playing	Spike Chunsoft	Spike Chunsoft	Apr 9, 2019	Jul 5, 2018	Apr 9, 2019		
Zengeon	Action role-playing	IndieLeague Studio	PQube	TBA	TBA	TBA		
Zenith	Role-playing	Infinigon Games	BadLand Indie	Jul 3, 2017	Sep 20, 2016	Sep 20, 2016		
Zen Pinball 2	Pinball	Zen Studios	Zen Studios	Unreleased	Dec 24, 2013	Dec 24, 2013	3D	
Zero Escape: The Nonary Games	Adventure	Spike Chunsoft	Aksys Games	Apr 13, 2017	Mar 24, 2017	Mar 24, 2017		
Zero Gunner 2-	Shoot 'em up	Zerodiv	City Connection	Jul 13, 2022	Jul 13, 2022	Jul 13, 2022		
Zero Strain	Shoot 'em up	Kaio Meris	EastAsiaSoft	Aug 20, 2020	Aug 12, 2020	Aug 12, 2020		
Zero Time Dilemma	Adventure	Chime	Spike Chunsoft	Aug 17, 2017	Aug 18, 2017	Sep 22, 2017		
Zheros	Action	Rimlight Studios	Rimlight Studios	Unreleased	Nov 14, 2016	Nov 14, 2016		
Ziggurat	Dungeon crawler	Milkstone Studios	Milkstone Studios	Unreleased	Apr 21, 2015	Apr 22, 2015		
Zombi	First-person shooter	Ubisoft	Ubisoft	Aug 19, 2015	Aug 18, 2015	Aug 18, 2015		
Zombie Army Trilogy	Tactical shooter	Rebellion Developments	505 Games	Mar 6, 2015	Mar 6, 2015	Mar 6, 2015	3D	
Zombie Army 4: Dead War	Tactical shooter	Rebellion Developments	505 Games	Feb 4, 2020	Feb 4, 2020	Feb 4, 2020		
Zombie Driver: Immortal Edition	Vehicular combat	Exor Studios	Exor Studios	Unreleased	Aug 14, 2020	Aug 14, 2020	P	
Zombie Vikings	Action	Zoink Games	Zoink Games	Sep 2, 2015	Sep 1, 2015	Sep 1, 2015		
Zombies Ate My Neighbors and Ghoul Patrol	Run and gun	Dotemu	Lucasfilm Games	Unreleased	Jun 29, 2021	Jun 29, 2021		
Zone of the Enders: The 2nd Runner – Mars	Hack and slash; third-person shooter	Cygames; Konami	Konami	Sep 6, 2018	Sep 4, 2018	Sep 6, 2018	P VR	
Zotrix	Shoot 'em up	Zerobit Games	UFO Interactive Games	Unreleased	Dec 8, 2015	Jan 8, 2016		

== See also ==
- List of best-selling PlayStation 4 video games
