= 1560 in music =

== Events ==
- Innocentio Alberti takes up a position as cornettist at the Este court in Ferrara, following the dissolution of the Accademia degli Elevati in Padua.

== Publications ==
- Ippolito Chamaterò – First book of madrigals for five voices (Venice: Antonio Gardano).
- Jacob Clemens non Papa – Tenth book of masses: Missa Quam pulchra es for four voices (Leuven: Pierre Phalèse), published posthumously.
- Claude Goudimel – Fourth book of psalms for four and five voices (Paris: Le Roy & Ballard)
- Orlande de Lassus
  - Fourth book of chansons for five and six voices (Louvain: Pierre Phalèse)
  - First book of madrigals for four voices (Rome: Valerio Dorico)
- Giovanni Paolo Paladino — First book of lute tablature, containing arrangements of pieces by various composers (Lyon: Simon Gorlier)
- Francesco Portinaro – Fourth book of madrigals for five voices (Venice: Antonio Gardano)
- Christoph Praetorius – De obitu reverendi viri Domini Philippi Melanthonis for four voices (Wittenberg: Georg Rhau), a funeral motet for Philip Melanchthon

== Births ==
- January 29 – Scipione Dentice, keyboard composer (d. 1633).
- August 10 – Hieronymus Praetorius, north German composer and organist (d. 1629).
- date unknown
  - William Brade, German composer of dance forms of the period (d. 1630).
  - Antonio Coma, Italian composer (d. 1629).
  - Peter Philips (c.1560/1561), eminent English composer, organist, and Catholic priest, the most published English composer in his time (d. 1628).
- probable
  - Giovanni Croce, Venetian composer (d. 1609).
  - Lodovico Grossi da Viadana, Italian composer (d. 1627).

== Deaths ==
- date unknown – Louis Bourgeois, composer of Calvinist hymn-tunes (born c.1510)
- probable
  - Marco Antonio Cavazzoni, organist and composer (born c.1490).
  - Nicolas Gombert, composer (born c.1495)
