= Coma (disambiguation) =

Coma is a profound state of brain inactivity.

Coma may also refer to:

== Arts and entertainment ==
=== Films and television ===
- Coma (1978 film), an American film based on the novel by Robin Cook
- Coma (2009 film), an Austrian film
- Coma (2020 film), a Russian science fiction film
- Coma (2022 film), a French film
- Coma (South Korean miniseries), a 2006 horror–mystery series
- Coma (American miniseries), a 2012 miniseries based on the novel by Robin Cook
- Coma (2024 TV series), a British drama series
- "Coma" (The Brak Show), 2003
- "Coma" (Twin Peaks), 1990

=== Literature ===
- Coma (novel), a 1977 novel by Robin Cook
- The Coma, a 2004 novel by Alex Garland

=== Music ===
- Coma (band), a Polish band
- Coma (EP), a 1994 EP by Max Sharam
- Coma, a 2018 album by Sunflower Dead

==== Songs ====
- "Coma" (Guns N' Roses song), 1991
- "Coma" (Max Sharam song)", on the 1994 EP Coma and album A Million Year Girl
- "Coma" (Pendulum song), 1997
- "Coma", by Buckethead from Enter the Chicken, 2005
- "Coma", by Caroline Polachek from Desire, I Want To Turn Into You: Everasking Edition, 2024
- "Coma", by God Is an Astronaut from The End of the Beginning, 2002
- "Coma", by Muse as the B-side of the single Cave, 1999
- "Coma", by Overkill from Horrorscope, 1991
- "Coma", by Stone Temple Pilots from Shangri-La Dee Da, 2001
- "Coma", by Suicideboys from I Want to Die in New Orleans, 2018
- "Coma", by Yeonjun from No Labels: Part 01, 2025

=== Video games ===
- The Coma: Cutting Class, a 2015 horror video game

== Astronomy ==
- Coma (comet), the diffuse portion of a comet
- Coma (optics), the comatic aberration
- Coma Cluster, located in the constellation Coma Berenices
- Coma Star Cluster, in Coma Berenices
- Coma Supercluster, in Coma Berenices
- An abbreviation for the constellation Coma Berenices

== Other uses ==
- Coma (fungi), a genus of fungi in the Phacidiaceae family
- Coma (optics), an aberration out of lens design
- Coma, Egypt, a village in Egypt in late antiquity
- C.O.M.A., underground music festival in Montreal, Canada
- Cache-only memory architecture for computers
- Coma, also known as the saffron plum

== People with the surname ==
- Coma (surname)

== See also ==
- Comas (disambiguation)
- Comatose (disambiguation)
- Comma (disambiguation)
