= Comas (surname) =

Comas is a Catalan surname. It is the plural form of the Catalan word coma, meaning valley, which is derived from the Gaulish word cumba of the same meaning. McComas is the Irish version of the surname.

Notable people with the surname include:

- Albert Rocas Comas (born 1982), Spanish handball player
- Alex Comas (born 1971), Colombian football player
- Antoni Comas i Pujol (1931–1981), Spanish Catalan literary historian and academic
- Antonio Medina Comas (born c. 1968), Spanish licensed industrial engineer, a business executive,
- Arnau Comas (born 2000), Spanish football player
- Arseni Comas (born 1961), Spanish Catalan football player
- Bernardo Comas (born 1960), Cuban former amateur boxer
- Érik Comas (born 1963), French Formula One driver
- Èric Jover Comas (born 1977), Andorran politician
- Jaime Comas (1936–2021), Spanish screenwriter and film producer
- Jaume Comas (born 1974), Spanish basketball player
- Joan Comas Pausas (1913–2009), Spanish painter and architect
- Jorge Comas, multiple people
- José Comas Quesada (1928–1993), Canarian painter
- Josep Comas i Solà (1868–1937), Spanish Catalan astronomer
- Juan Comas (1900–1979), Spanish Mexican anthropologist
- Lautaro Comas (born 1995), Argentine football player
- Lillian Comas-Díaz, American psychologist
- Marina Comas (born 1996), Spanish Catalan actress
- Philip Hovis Comas (1864–1934), American physician and state legislator
- Ramón Balcells Comas (born 1951), Spanish Catalan sailor
- Román Comas (born 1999), Argentine football player
- Xavier Comas Guixé (born 1977), Andorran ski mountaineer

== See also ==
- Coma (surname)
