= Coma (surname) =

Coma is a Spanish surname. Notable people with the surname include:

- Antonio Coma (1560–1629), Italian composer
- Franché Coma or Frank LiCata (born 1957), American musician
- Joan Coma (1877–1959), president of FC Barcelona
- Joan Tardà i Coma (born 1953), Catalan teacher and politician
- Joel Font Coma (born 1966), Andorran politician
- José Galofré y Coma (1819–1877), Spanish historical painter
- Julian Vila Coma, Andorran ambassador
- Marc Coma (born 1976), Spanish motorcycle rider
- Olga Adellach Coma (born 1966), Andorran politician
- Patricia Coma, Filipino actress in the television drama First Yaya
- Pau Prim Coma (born 2006), Spanish professional footballer
- Pere de Coma (fl. 13th century), architect
- Tony Coma, American basketball coach

== See also ==
- Coma (disambiguation)
