= Vambrace: Cold Soul =

2019 video game

- Developer(s): Devespresso Games
- Publisher(s): Headup, WhisperGames (PC); Headup (NS, PS4); Chorus Worldwide (XBO)
- Engine: Unity
- Platform(s): Linux; macOS; Windows; Xbox One; Nintendo Switch; PlayStation 4
- Release: Linux, macOS, Windows; May 28, 2019; Xbox One; August 28, 2019; Switch, PlayStation 4; August 29, 2019
- Genre(s): Roguelike, role-playing
- Mode(s): Single-player

Vambrace: Cold Soul is a 2019 roguelike dungeon crawler role-playing video game developed by South Korean studio Devespresso Games. It was released for Linux, macOS, Windows, Nintendo Switch, PlayStation 4, and Xbox One. Set in a dark fantasy world, the game follows Evelia Lyric as she leads a series of expeditions to explore the haunted lost city of Icenaire, which is covered under a deep layer of ice, in order to solve the mystery behind the magical vambrace she wields. From Dalearch, the last safe region within Icenaire, players may craft items, compose parties of adventurers for an expedition that traverses the city's haunted ruins and prepare Lyric for an eventual confrontation against a powerful adversary known as the Shade King.

Vambrace: Cold Soul bears many similarities to the 2016 video game Darkest Dungeon, particularly with its mix of real-time movement and turn-based combat, the player's management of a group of procedurally-generated characters who accompany Lyric, as well as gameplay mechanics which represent the toll it takes on party members with further exploration and combat. The game's art style is developed by Devespresso CEO Minho Kim and is similar in visual aesthetic to The Coma, a previous project by his team.

Vambrace drew mixed reviews from video game publications following its release. Reviewers generally praised the game's artwork and engaging setting, while criticism focused on its design decisions and unbalanced difficulty.

== Gameplay ==
In Vambrace: Cold Soul, players assume the role of Evelia Lyric, who is determined to explore the frozen city of Icenaire in search of answers to a mystery in her life. Dalearch, a section of the city which is safe from the city's undead hordes, is the game's starting area. It serves as a hub area for players to manage their roster of heroes as well as inventory of items. Players may travel around Dalearch's districts and converse with its various residents in a similar manner as a visual novel. The game's story spans across seven different chapters, and within each chapter is a self-contained expedition within a region of Icenaire.

The core gameplay loop of Vambrace involves expeditions of a band of procedurally generated heroes and adventurers launched from Dalearch into other regions of the city. Each region consists of sectors that could be navigated with a map, and each room in a sector has a single procedurally generated encounter: it may end up being a combat encounter with enemies, a treasure room, or a camp where the player's party can rest. Each sector contain eight to ten rooms, though a path to the exit is generally only five rooms. Players must complete five sectors to reach the boss encounter of any region. Players can take more straightforward routes through these sub-zones, or in the alternative, wander in the hopes of encountering more loot and treasure.

An important gameplay element of Vambrace: Cold Soul is its Health and Vigor system: the depletion of either resource may result in a party member's demise. A timer meter called a Geistometer runs while the player party is traversing a dungeon, slowly counting upwards in Terror until it is full, at which point the party is constantly beset by hostile encounters with undead Shades. Opportunities for healing and recovery are rare as the party can only heal outside of combat in specific camps, which is available in once instance per sector, unless a party member is a healer or if the player uses healing items. The rate of recovery for Health and Vigor while resting is randomly generated, based on Overwatch statistic of the character chosen by the player to guard the camp. Combat encounters play out in a turn-based manner. Enemy attacks drain Health or Vigor, and certain spells impart negative status effects like Terrified, Befuddled, or Sleepy that hampers the party's chances of survival. Retreating from the expedition is a viable strategy for players to preserve the lives of party members and retain any recovered resources in the face of a potentially disastrous combat encounter, although all accumulated progress on the expedition will be lost as a consequence.

Players select up to three mercenaries, pulled at random from a pool with five different races and ten classes with distinct names and appearances, to accompany Lyric as they explore a series of procedurally-generated dungeons. Party members may be recruited from the Hunter's Camp, or during random encounters in the regions of Icenaire. At the beginning of the game, the pool that players can choose from is limited in selection, and which subsequently expands as players complete chapters. With the exception of Lyric, who gradually improves from being one of the weakest members of the squad and improves the pool of potential characters at the Hunters Camp as a result, party members do not level up. Players may improve the statistics of existing party members by equipping new relics or crafted gear using material collected from slain foes on expeditions. Players may move a specific character's position in the party by selecting the character and then selecting the position they should be moving toward.

== Plot ==
The game begins with a monologue narrated by Evelia Lyric, a woman who inherits from her late father a magical vambrace of unknown origin along with an encrypted journal, which claims that the vambrace is instrumental for entry into the cursed city of Icenaire in the Dwarven realm of Dokkheim. Guided by her father's notes, Lyric leaves her home of Edena and travels to Icenaire, where she discovers that the vambrace could bypass a thick icy barrier surrounding the city, which is preventing every other individual from entering or leaving it.

Lyric is trapped deep in snow shortly after her arrival and loses consciousness, but is saved by a scavenging party before she freezes to death. Astonished at their discovery of the first outsider to have arrived in years, Lyric is taken to Dalearch, an underground settlement which is only safe space in Icenaire. Teetering on the verge of civil unrest, it is home to several competing factions who vie for control of the district: the Guardians, the Sylvani, and the North Venture Company. Following her awakening, Lyric learns that the barrier surrounding Icenaire is said to have been created by a malevolent entity known as the Shade King, who commands a legion of undead wraiths that roam the city's deserted streets and attack any living being they encounter. She also discovers that she can dispel the undead and break down the city's ice barriers with the power of the vambrace she wields. Recruiting a group of like-minded adventurers, Lyric explores Icenaire's streets and progress further into the labyrinthine city, with the goal of unraveling the mystery of her father's writings and deal with the Shade King.

== Development ==
The development team for Vambrace consisted of a group of four members led by Devespresso CEO Minho Kim, who also functioned as the game's lead artist and had responsibilities for art, animations, and illustrations. While conceptual work for the art of Vambrace began in 2016, Kim claimed that the process in capturing the world and concept of Vambrace was 15 years in the making. The basic concept of Vambrace had its origins in the team's shared passion for tabletop role-playing games. According to Kim, writer Tristan Lee Riven used a bottom-up approach to world building" in order to ensure that story element could be integrated in a cohesive manner. Riven was responsible for creating the races, cultures and nations featured in the final product.

For the game's art style, Kim aimed for a more polished look in contrast to Devespresso's previous game, The Coma: Cutting Class. The Castlevania series was an important inspiration for the gothic horror aesthetic of Vambrace, as is the 2016 video game Darkest Dungeon. Kim was primarily inspired by media such as illustrated tale books when he started drawing to visualize his own original stories. Kim's team completed work on a remastered edition of The Coma titled The Coma: Recut prior to the release of Vambrace. Although the visual style for Vambrace has not evolved much from The Coma once development officially began, Kim was able to pin down visuals that mixed his original illustrative style and games he previously worked on. He struggled for a time to finalize his artistic vision of the game, but reached a breakthrough once he finished the final portrait illustration of the game's protagonist Evelia Lyric. Kim claimed that the body of art work he single-handedly produced for Vambrace was "overwhelming" and about equal to the amount produced by an art team for a developmental project of comparable size and scope between one and two years. A reason given by Kim for the large overhead view of the world map during the transition in between levels was to give players a strong visualization of the damage and scale of the curse placed upon Icenaire.

Other important sources of inspiration include the lore and immersion of The Elder Scrolls series, as the procedural nature and high difficulty curve of FTL: Faster Than Light. These informed the team's approach in attempting to develop an epic storyline with roguelike mechanics, as they wanted players to be immersed in the story. While Icenaire is combat-focused, the underground city is meant to be a safe haven for the preparation of expeditions, and plays a pivotal role in the progression of the game's narrative.

The possibility of romance options for the player-controlled Lyric was considered at one point. Confronted with the scope of a narrative-driven game with a long, fleshed-out story, branching dialogue options and multiple endings, the team decided that a sacrifice had to be made and it was never implemented.

== Release ==
Vambrace was released in 2019 with PC version launching on May 28, with Headup Games as the publisher. The game received a number of updates shortly after launch in response to player feedback. Xbox One, PS4 and Switch versions were released in August. The console versions of Vambrace incorporated all prior updates and technical improvements released for the PC version.

== Reception ==
Reception

Aggregate score
Aggregator	Score
Metacritic	(PC) 59/100 (NS) 59/100 (XONE) 66/100

Review scores
Publication	Score
Nintendo Life	4/10
Nintendo World Report	7.5/10
Official Xbox Magazine (UK)	6/10
USgamer	5/10
IGN Spain	7/10
Digitally Downloaded	5/10

Vambrace: Cold Soul received mixed or average reviews for all release platforms according to review aggregator Metacritic.
