= Castro de La Mesa de Miranda =

Hill fort in Spain

Coordinates: 40°43′15″N 4°56′47″W

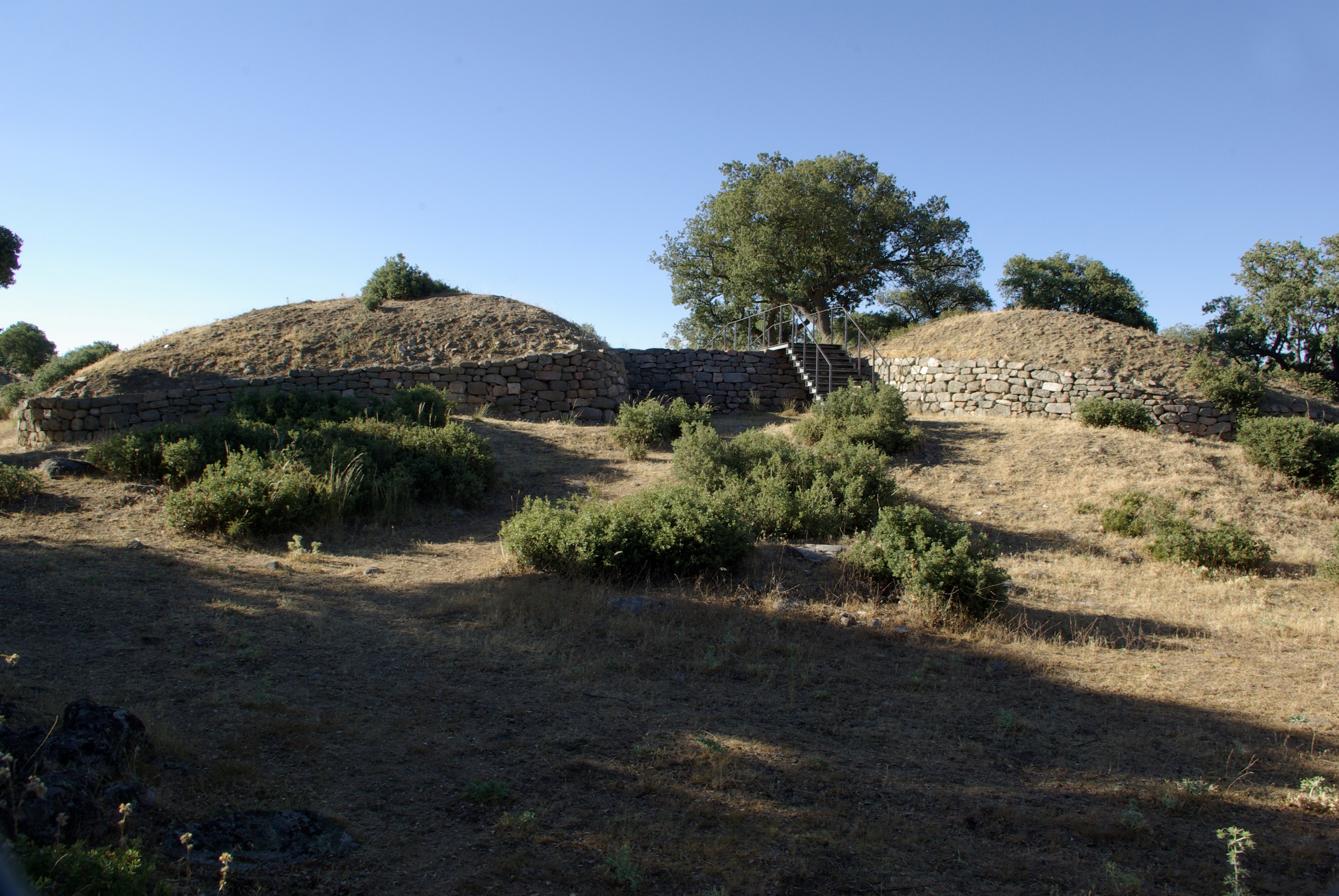

The settlement La Mesa de Miranda, located in the municipality of Chamartín in the province of Ávila in Spain, was a hill fort or oppidum (also known as a castro) where Vettones people lived between the late fifth and the first century BC. Some ruins are visible after archaeological excavations have taken place.

== Description ==
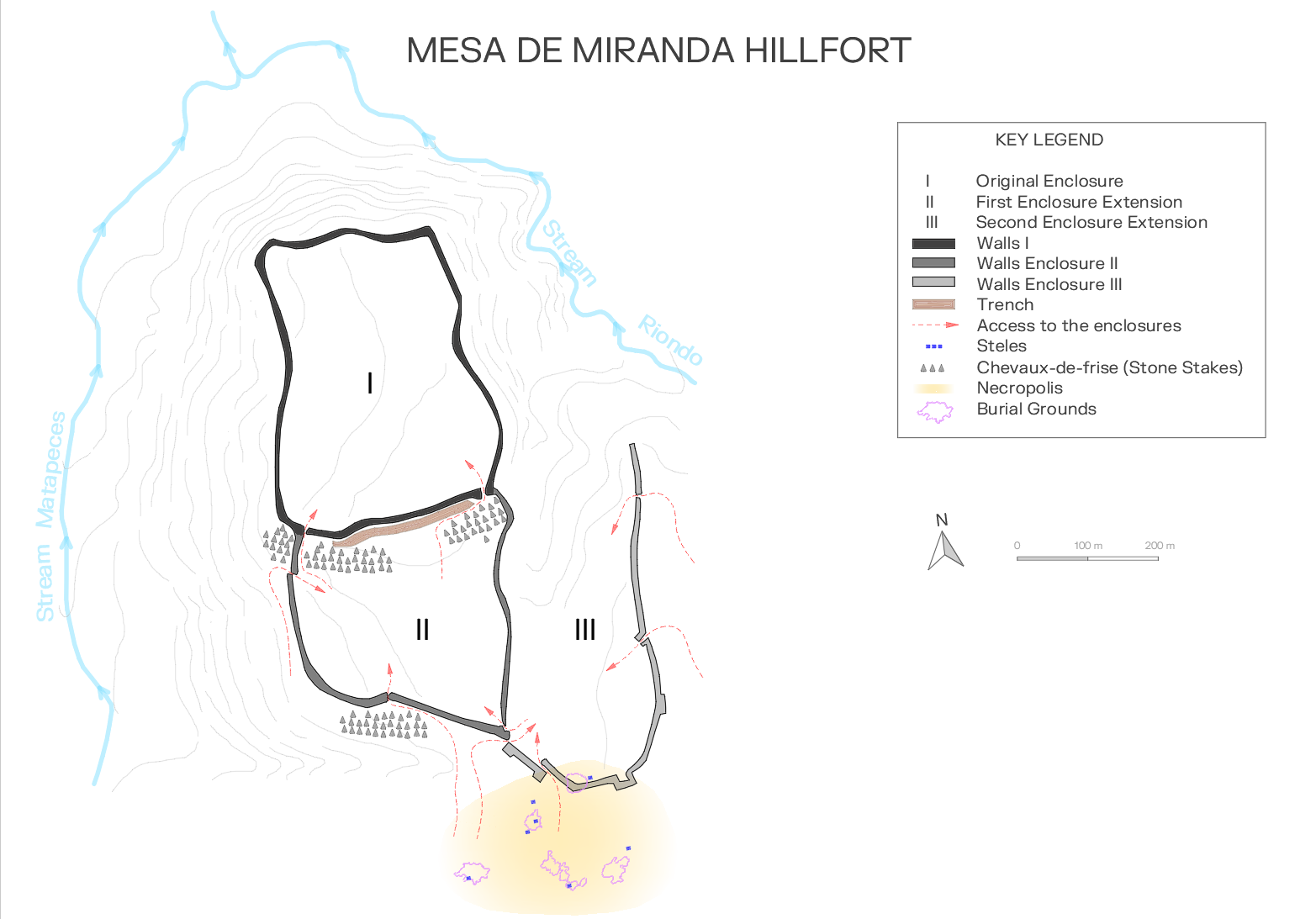
The hillfort is located on a granitic plateau between the confluence of two streams that created the steep cliffs north of the settlement. This oppidum consists of three walled enclosures. Note the defensive scheme which was composed by a large trench and chevaux-de-frise in the entrances of the enclosures

The place was strategically chosen as it is easily defended. Since it is located on a plateau between two rivers that, by erosion, created a cliff to the north of the fort. The castro consists of three enclosures: Castillo Bajero (lower castle), rectangular in shape with a walled perimeter of 1303 meters, against which is built the second enclosure to the south, Castillo Cimero (upper castle), trapezoidal in shape with a perimeter of 1716 meters. These two enclosures are connected by gates flanked by towers. The third enclosure abuts the two earlier ones on their eastern side. The dimensions of this third enclosure suggest that it was a livestock pen. South of the walls, we can find the necropolis named “La Osera”, where 2230 graves were discovered. Different burial areas were identified by a vertical stone, or stele, with a height between 50 and 160 cm. It is believed that these stelae were used for astronomical events based on Solstices and Celtic religious festivals.

The oppidum was enclosed by a 2,832 m long wall and 5 meters wide on average, built from large blocks of stone, enclosing an area of circa 30 ha..

According to excavations, the necropolis dates from the 3rd century BC to the early 3rd century AD, a period during which burials took place. The wall must have been built in the late 3rd or early 4th century BC.

By taking into account the number of houses found, the extension of the settlement and the cemetery findings, the estimated population of the oppidum was between 300 and 375 inhabitants, making it a noticeable settlement at that time.

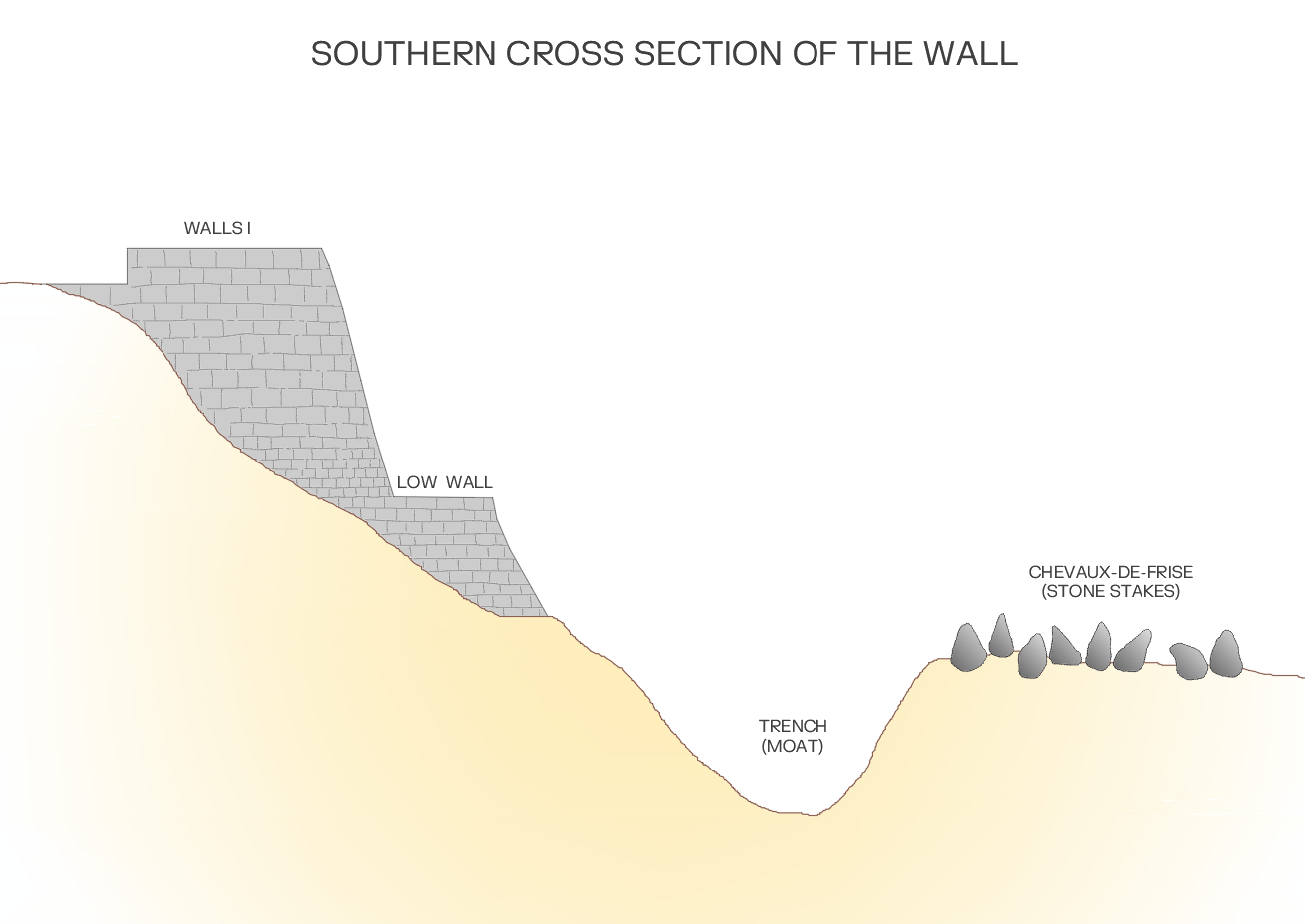
Cross Section of the Southern Walls. The walls consisted of two levels, the moat (trench) and the cheavux-de-frise (stone stakes) acted as a defensive system in the less steep side of the hill.

The fortified settlement was recently restored and opened to the public in 2004.
