= The Coma 2: Vicious Sisters =

2020 video game

- Developer(s): Devespresso Games
- Publisher(s): Headup Games
- Platform(s): Windows; Nintendo Switch; PlayStation 4; Xbox One
- Release: Win; WW: January 28, 2020; PS4, Switch; WW: June 19, 2020; Xbox One; WW: September 3, 2020
- Genre(s): Survival horror
- Mode(s): Single-player

The Coma 2: Vicious Sisters is a 2020 survival horror video game developed by Devespresso Games and published by Headup Games. It is the sequel to The Coma: Cutting Class.

== Gameplay ==
Players control Mina Park, a high school student who is a friend of Youngho, the protagonist of The Coma: Cutting Class. After passing out, Park wakes in the Coma, a horrific alternate dimension, to find one of her teachers, Ms. Song, has become possessed by an evil spirit known for the Vicious Sister. While evading Ms. Song, players can explore the world, perform side-quests, and collect clues that explain the lore. When Ms. Song appears, players must find a safe spot and hide from her; this involves quick time events. Eventually, players gain the ability to craft items to help them survive. The Coma 2 is a survival horror game that uses hand-drawn comic book-style art in side-scrolling scenes.

== Development ==
After entering early access in November 2019, Headup Games released The Coma 2 for Windows on January 28, 2020; for PlayStation 4 and Switch on June 19, 2020; and for Xbox One on September 3, 2020. It was developed in South Korea.

== Reception ==
On Metacritic, The Coma 2: Vicious Sisters received mixed reviews for Xbox One and Switch, and the Windows version received positive reviews. Shacknews liked that playing The Coma: Cutting Class was not necessary to understand the plot. Although they found Ms. Song's attacks more frustrating than scary, they praised the art and said it was a slick and exciting game that made them interested in playing Cutting Class. Nintendo Life praised the art and story, but they felt it was a bit short and had a poor replay value. They also said the sound and dialogue sounded cheaply recorded. Both Nintendo Life and Digitally Downloaded disliked the crafting elements, which both said felt tacked-on. Commenting on what they felt was too much thematic restraint, Digitally Downloaded called it enjoyable but "too safe to be good horror".
