= Bletonesii =

Main language areas in Iberia c. 300 BC

The Bletonesii were one of the pre-Roman Celtic peoples of the Iberian Peninsula (the Roman Hispania, modern Spain and Portugal), dwelling around the city of Bletisa or Bletisama, located in modern Ledesma in the province of Salamanca, Spain. If the placement in Bletisa is correct, they lived near (or they were part of) the Vettones. A hospitality token dated to AD 27 mentions the "senate and people of Bletisama," and the name Bletonesii as found in Plutarch may be equivalent to the Bletisamenses found in inscriptions.

== Religious practice ==
According to Plutarch, the governing Romans learned that the Bletonesii had sacrificed a human to the gods, and called their leaders to account for this action. The leaders explained that the sacrifice was carried out in accordance with the law and custom of their people, a concept for which Plutarch uses the Greek word nomos, equivalent to Roman mos. This explanation was accepted, since the Romans themselves had carried out human sacrifices in the earlier Republic, but the practice was forbidden for the future. The incident may have occurred shortly before the Roman senate formally banned human sacrifice in 97 BC, and had some influence on deliberations.

== See also ==
- Vettones
- Pre-Roman peoples of the Iberian Peninsula
