= Joan Comas Pausas =

Spanish painter

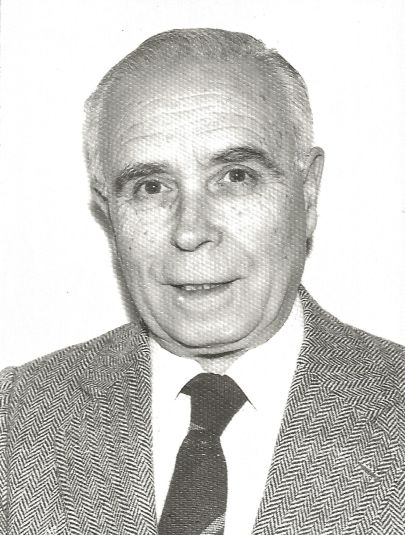
- Comas-Pausas, c. 1973.
- Born: Joan Comas Pausas; 25 June 1913; Vilafranca del Penedès, Catalonia, Spain
- Died: 3 April 2009 (aged 95); Vilafranca del Penedès, Catalonia, Spain
- Education: Baixas Academy (Barcelona)
- Known for: Painting, watercolour, oil

Joan Comas Pausas (Vilafranca del Penedès, 25 June 1913 – 3 April 2009) was a Spanish painter, menswear trader and technical architect.

== Biography ==
Joan Comas Pausas was born in Vilafranca del Penedès in Barcelona Province, Catalonia, Spain. He was the son of Antonio Comas Torregrosa and Josefa Pausas Rovira. Orphaned at the age of fourteen, he moved to Barcelona where he became interested in fine arts: painting, drawing and antiquities. Barcelona was the city where he developed artistically. He attended drawing lessons with the painter Juan Lahosa at Baixas Academy.

Comas-Pausas worked in a men's outfitter as an apprentice until 1944 when he went back to Vilafranca and opened his own business. From 1961 he worked also as a freelance technical architect, after finishing the appropriate studies.

In those years Comas-Pausas could only spend a little time on his favourite hobby – painting. Nevertheless, in 1955 he received a prize for an oil painting on a panel. He continued to train on his own and his work was distributed privately. It was not until 1976 that he began to exhibit his work in public, mainly using watercolour.

In this same year, as part of the celebration of the "Centenary of Hiking in Catalonia", Comas-Pausas exhibited 27 watercolours in Vilafranca Museum. A critic thus described the painting of Comas-Pausas: "Comas' landscapes ooze light; and only the sensitivity of a person that loves nature can combine with such fidelity the shades of what forms the essence of our countryside – that lonely little church, the human element that year by year becomes part of the landscape, the loneliness of the Pyrenean lakes, dead nature (paradoxically full of life) in dry trees killed by the storms, or the outburst of colour in plants and rocks. And above it all, those gloomy or serenely cloudy skies, a kaleidoscope that we ramblers are used to contemplating, and that Comas-Pausas knows so well how to reflect".

== Technique ==
In his oil paintings, Comas-Pausas preferred indoor subjects with figures. In watercolour, the method in which he came to specialise, he painted landscapes, seascapes and urban scenes.

His watercolours closely follow the traditional schools of Catalan landscape painting. The painting is descriptive and easy to read, the composition carefully worked out, the range of colours harmonious and nuanced, all the result of a thrilled sensitivity to nature. The tonal range is adapted to the varying atmosphere and light of the paintings.

Comas-Pausas also painted urban themes, mainly in Spain, France, Italy, Switzerland, Liechtenstein, Austria and the Netherlands, and visited art galleries to study the pictorial works.

== Exhibitions ==
He exhibited privately in Vilanova i la Geltrú, Vilafranca del Penedès, Olot, Martorell, Ripoll, Molins de Rei, Igualada, El Vendrell, Begues and Barcelona (at Mayte Muñoz gallery and at the Technical Architects Association).

As a member of the Watercolour Association of Catalonia, he participated in every collective exhibition of this Association from 1977 to 1989 in Barcelona (Palau de la Virreina, Palau Reial de Pedralbes, Antiguo Hospital de la Santa Cruz and Banco de Bilbao), Terrassa, Vilafranca (Museum), and Lleida (Institut d’Estudis Ilerdencs). He was selected to represent the Association in the National Watercolour Exhibition in Bilbao in 1984. He also participated in other collective exhibitions in Olot, Ledesma (Salamanca) and Vilafranca. The shows in Vilafranca included one in 1985 with five other artists in the Forum Berger Balaguer, and later "Painting and Sculpture in Vilafranca 1900-1999".

On the occasion of the centenary of his birth in 2013, there was a retrospective exhibition in the Forum Berger Balaguer in Vilafranca del Penedès.

His work is found in prívate collections in Spain, France, Germany, the United Kingdom and the Museum of Vilafranca.

== Bibliography ==
- Dictionary "Rafols" of contemporary artists from Catalonia and Balearic Islands. Volume 1. Page362. Barcelona (1984).
- ARTES PLASTICAS, nº 52, Watercolour, Page 73.
- ARTES PLASTICAS, nº 55, Page 61.
- Illustration: "Cuaderns Literaris Penedesencs", Page 18. Spring 1982.
- Magazine "Olérdola" nº 8 of Vilafranca Museum. March 1980. On the then recent exhibition of the Watercolour Association of Catalonia.
