= Comas (disambiguation) =

A coma is a deep state of prolonged unconsciousness.

Comas may also refer to:

- Comas (surname), list of people with the surname
- The Comas, American indie rock band
- Comas District, Lima, Peru
- Comas District, Concepción, Peru
- Chief Comas (fl. 1809–1814) 19th-century Potawatomi chieftain
- The College of Management Academic Studies, the largest college in Israel
