= El Raso =

Ancient Vetton village

Coordinates: 40.183°N 5.356°W

El Raso oppidum (also known as a castro) is an ancient Vetton hill fort and village in Candeleda, a town in the province of Ávila, Spain. It is found in a spot called El Freíllo, not far from the small village of El Raso. It's made up of a few different walled sections spread out over at least three connected areas, covering in total about 20 hectares. Some of the archaeological findings, which include silver coins and other items, are now on display at the Ávila Museum, with all the items called the El Raso hoard.

The archaeological works included the restoration of two of the dwellings to house an interpretation center that provides information about the site.

== Location ==
The archaeological site is located in the southwestern part of the province of Ávila, three kilometres from the hamlet of El Raso. It belongs to the municipality of Candeleda and is accessible via a detour off the C-501. The site is situated at Cabeza de la Laguna, a hill overlooking the Alardos Gorge on the southern slope of the Sierra de Gredos, near Tiétar.

== History ==
The site originated as a village at "El Castañar", located on a plain and without human-built defences, following a population increase between the Late Bronze Age and the beginning of the Iron Age. This village appears to have been burned and destroyed during the Punic military campaign in the Meseta in 220 BC, commanded by Hannibal Barca.

The local population then took refuge on the heights at La Cabeza de la Laguna, thus creating the oppidum founded by the Vettones. Juan Antonio Martín Ruiz suggests that its ancient name could be Ebora.

The site was occupied from the late 3rd to the mid-1st century BC until its abandonment, likely following instructions given by Julius Caesar during the Roman conquest. The evacuation appears to have been peaceful and methodical, and the goods needed by the local population seem to have been transferred with them. Consequently, most of the village was destroyed and its walls damaged by the Romans, forcing its inhabitants to relocate once again to the flat areas of the valley, which also led to the gradual abandonment of the site. The new site was rebuilt on the former village of "El Castañar".

== Description ==
The site occupies a dominant position above the Alardos gorges, which serve as its moat; a votive offering, deliberately thrown into the water, made of Iberian bronze and depicting a man with a conical headdress, was discovered there. This strategic position allows control of the lower part of the site and access to the pastures of the Sierra de Gredos.

Its area is estimated at 20 hectares, which would have accommodated between 2,500 and 3,000 people. The settlement has a 2 km long perimeter wall with an average width of 2-3 m, reinforced towers, and bastions. Its upper section is entirely protected by a fort, and towards the plain, it retains the remains of a wall. In front of the wall is a wide ditch, which is thought to have contained a ramp of standing stones.

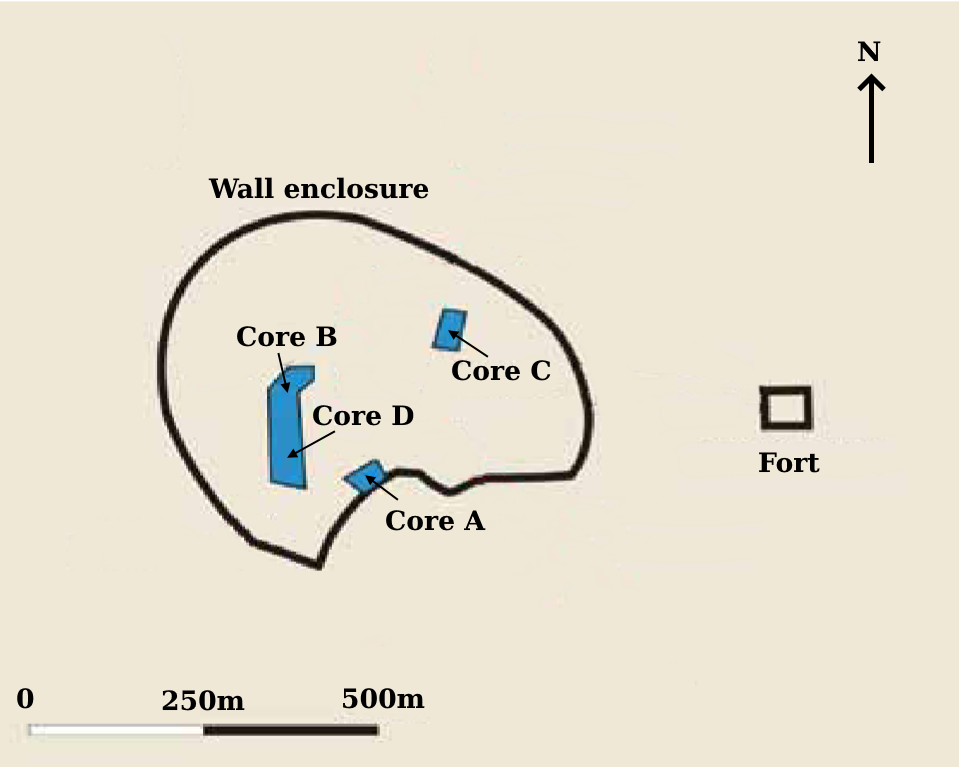

Three sections were excavated within the enclosure area in the 1980s (cores A, B and C), then a new one was discovered in the early 2010s (core D), revealing a high density of occupation but a lack of urban organisation. The street layout is irregular. Outside the castro, at the point where the Alardos gorges meet the Tiétar, lies the sanctuary of Postoloboso, dedicated to the god Vaelico, associated with the wolf, which must have been abundant in this area. This sanctuary became Romanized after the Roman conquest. Stone votive offerings from the Roman period of the 1st and 2nd centuries, given in gratitude for a prayer answered, have been discovered.

== Archaeology ==
The first excavations were carried out in the first quarter of the 20th century by Fulgencio Serrano, a local resident. In 1935, Juan Cabré Aguilo attempted to launch excavations but without success. They were not resumed until 1957 by Antonio Molinero, who discovered a bronze figurine of Etruscan origin. The site has been systematically excavated since 1970 by Fernando Fernández Gómez until the end of the 1980s. The rectangular structures are well preserved overall and the objects discovered inside are almost all identical (weapons, brooches, pottery fragments, bronze or iron objects and coins)
