= McComas =

McComas is a surname. Comas is the reduced version of the surname which is the plural form of the Catalan word como originating from the Gaulish cumba meaning valley. Notable people with the surname include:

- Alice Moore McComas (1850–1919), American author, editor, lecturer, reformer
- Campbell McComas, Australian comedian, writer, and actor
- Carroll McComas (1886 – 1962), American actress
- Daniel F. McComas, American politician
- David McComas, American space scientist
- Edward O. McComas (1919–1954), American flying ace during World War II
- Francis McComas (1875–1938), Australian-born artist
- George W. McComas (1841–1928), American politician
- James Douglas McComas, former president of three U.S. universities
- J. Francis McComas, American science fiction editor
- Kendall McComas, American child actor
- Lorissa McComas, American nude model
- Louis E. McComas, American politician
- Walter R. McComas (1879–1922), American politician and lawyer
- William McComas (1795–1865), American politician and lawyer from Virginia

== See also ==
- Clan MacThomas, a Scottish clan of the McComases
- McComas, West Virginia, an unincorporated community in Mercer County, West Virginia.
