= Comma (disambiguation) =

A comma (,) is a type of punctuation mark that separates clauses.

Comma, commas, or , may also refer to:

== Arts, entertainment, and media ==
=== Music ===
- Comma (music), a type of interval in music theory
- Comma (rhetoric), a short clause in Ancient Greek rhetoric
- "Commas" (song), the censored version of the Future song "Fuck Up Some Commas"
- Commas (Ayra Starr song), an afropop song by Nigerian singer Ayra Starr
- Comma, an atmospheric metal album by April Weeps

=== Other arts, entertainment, and media ===
- Comma, the journal of the International Council on Archives
- Comma Press, a British publisher

== Other uses ==
- Comma (butterfly), several species of butterfly in the genus Polygonia
- Comma operator, an operator in C and other related programming languages
- Johannine Comma, 1 John 5:7-8
- Serial comma (also known as series comma, Oxford comma, or Harvard comma), a disputed usage of the punctuation mark
- Commas (Kinawley), a townland in County Cavan, Ireland
- Tomoe, commonly translated as "comma", a symbol used in Japanese mon
- Comma.ai, a company known for producing Openpilot

== See also ==
- Caesura
- Coma (disambiguation)
- Commer
- Kama
