= Chamartín, Province of Ávila =

Chamartín
- municipality
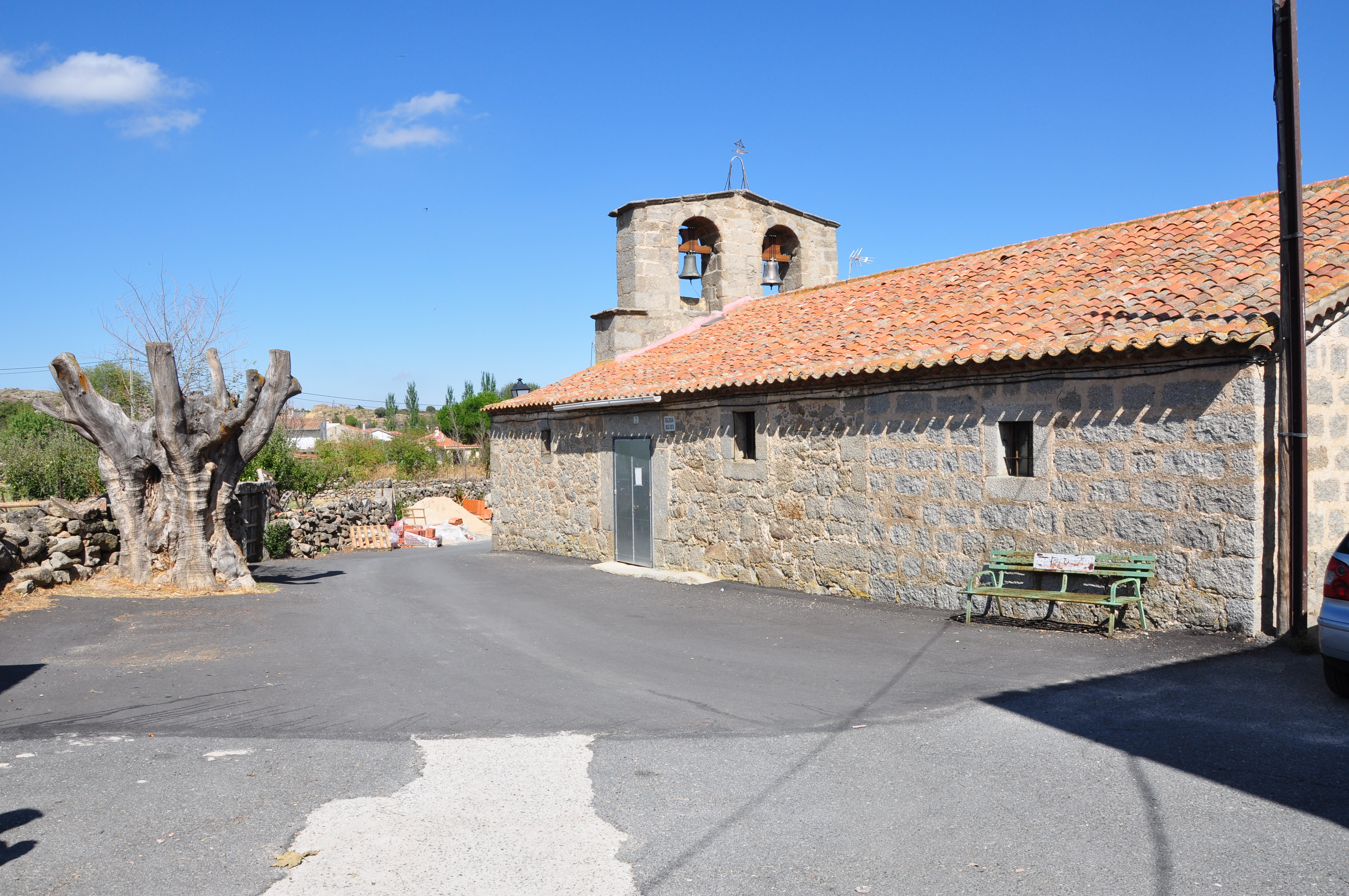
- Church of La Inmaculada and dry field elm

- Flag Coat of arms

- Location in Spain. Chamartín (Spain)
- Coordinates: 40°42′04″N 4°57′29″W
- Country: Spain
- Autonomous community: Castile and León
- Province: Ávila
- Municipality: Chamartín

Area
  - Total: 15.45 km^{2} (5.97 sq mi)
- Elevation: 1,197 m (3,927 ft)

Population (2025-01-01)
  - Total: 61
  - Density: 3.9/km^{2} (10/sq mi)
- Time zone: CET
  - Summer (DST): CEST
- Website: Official website

Chamartín is a municipality located in the province of Ávila, Castile and León, Spain.

== Population ==
Historical population
Year	Pop.	±% p.a.
2023	61	—
2024	62	+1.64%
2025	61	−1.61%
Source: INE
