= Christoph Praetorius =

- Born: Bunzlau, Silesia, Poland
- Died: 1590; Lüneburg, Germany
- Occupation(s): Author, choirmaster, composer
- Years active: 1560–1581

Christoph Praetorius (died 1590) was an author, choirmaster and composer. He entered the University of Wittenberg in 1551. Christoph was born in Bunzlau, Silesia, but the date of his birth is unknown. His earliest composition, a funeral motet, appears to be from around 1560, which was the date of the first of four collections consisting of sacred music for vocalists. He served as Kantor at the Lüneburg Johannisschule from 1563 until 1581. He was obliged to resign as Kantor because he had become deaf, yet he continued his compositional activity as evidenced by a wedding motet written for Euricius Dedekind’s wedding. He published two books on music theory between 1563 and 1581. The last of his sacred vocal volumes appeared in 1581. He died in Lüneburg in 1590.

His compositions have not been deemed masterworks, but his writings on music were widely quoted. They included the use of the 12 Glarean modes, coloratura training, and the use of ‘voces fictae’.

He was the uncle of Michael Praetorius.

== Published works ==
=== Prose ===
- Erotemata renovatae, Wittenberg, 1574
- Erotemata renovatae musicae, Ülzen, 1581

=== Music ===
- De obitu, Wittenberg, 1560
- Melodia epithalamia composite in nuptiis, Wittenberg, 1561
- Fröliche und liebliche Ehrnlieder, Wittenberg, 1581
- Der ander Teil: frölicher und lieblicher Ehrnlieder, Wittenberg, 1581
- Carmen nuptial in honorem, Ülzen, 1581
