= Joel Font Coma =

Andorran politician

Joel Font Coma (born 21 December 1966) is an Andorran politician. He is a member of the Liberal Party of Andorra, and served as Minister of Economy and Agriculture from 2005 to 2009.
