= Giovanni Paolo Paladino =

Italian composer and lutenist

Giovanni Paolo Paladino or Jean-Paul Paladin (fl. 1540-1560) was an Italian composer and lutenist from Milan. He was born Giovanni Paolo Paladino and was also a merchant who maintained a large house and vineyard in Lyons. From 1516-22 he was lutenist to Francois I, from 1544 with Charles III of Lorraine, and from 1548-53 with Queen Mary of Scotland. Paladino published three books of lute music in Lyons in 1549, 1553 and 1560.

== Works ==
Selected works include:

- Gagliarda sopra la Paladina, lute solo
- Fantasia, lute solo
- Tablatura de lutz, collection
- Premiire ìivre de tablature de lutti, collection

== Discography ==
Paladino's music has been recorded and issued on media including:

- TAbvlatvres de Levt, Astree AS 76, 1990
- Early Italian Lute Music, 1986
