= José Galofré y Coma =

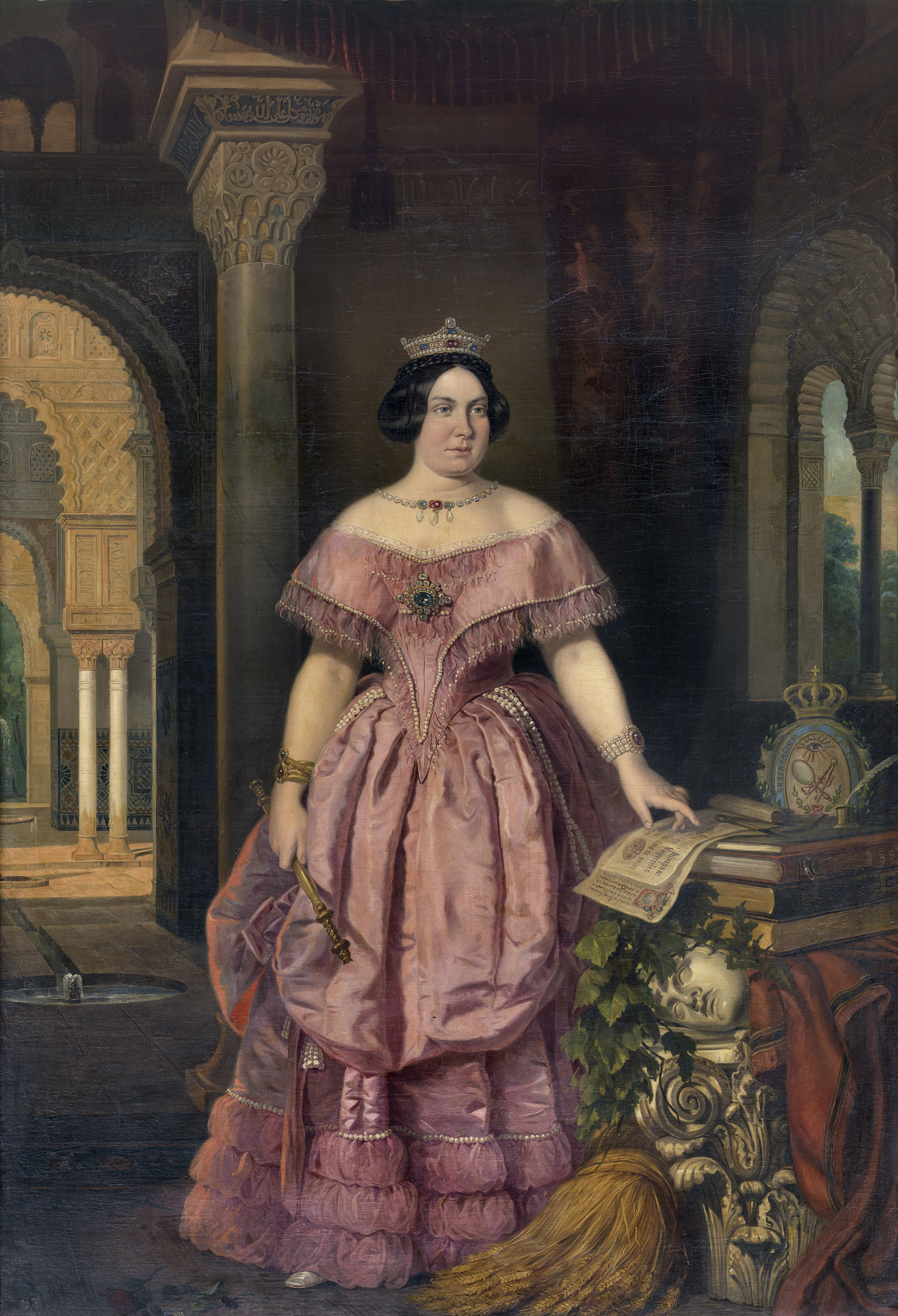
Isabel II of Spain by José Galofré y Coma

José Galofré y Coma (1819-1877), was a Spanish historical painter from Barcelona. He studied in Rome, where he became an associate of Johann Friedrich Overbeck. In 1854 he painted for the Queen of Spain An Episode from the Conquest of Granada in 1494. He also published a book on Art in Italy and other Countries of Europe.
