= Jorge Comas =

Jorge Comas may refer to:

- Jorge Comas (footballer) (born 1960), former Argentine footballer
- Jorge Comas (swimmer) (born 1954), Spanish former swimmer
