= Comatose (disambiguation) =

Comatose may refer to:

- Being in a state of a coma, or being unconscious
- Comatose (album), a 2006 album by Skillet
  - "Comatose" (Skillet song), the title song
- "Comatose", a song by Ayreon from 01011001, 2008
- "Comatose", a song by Bad Wolves from Dear Monsters, 2021
- "Comatose", a song by Coheed and Cambria from the album Vaxis – Act II: A Window of the Waking Mind, 2022
- "Comatose", a song by Chimaira from Chimaira, 2005
- "Comatose", a song by Depeche Mode from Exciter, 2001
- "Comatose", a song by Front Line Assembly from (FLA)vour of the Weak, 1997
- "Commatose", a song by the band Glass Beach in the album Plastic Death
- "Comatose", a song by jxdn, 2020
- "Comatose", a song by Mikky Ekko from Time, 2015
- "Comatose", a song by Nina Sky from Nicole and Natalie, 2012
- "Comatose", a song by Northlane from Discoveries, 2011
- "Comatose", a song by P.M. Dawn from Of the Heart, of the Soul and of the Cross: The Utopian Experience, 1991
- "Comatose", a song by Pearl Jam from Pearl Jam, 2006
- "Comatose", a song by Threat Signal from Threat Signal, 2011
- Comatose Music, record label
