= Ippolito Chamaterò =

Italian composer

Ippolito Chamaterò (also Chamatterò di Negri, Camaterò; first name also Hippolito; late 1530s – after 1592) was an Italian composer of the late Renaissance, originally from Rome but active in northern Italy. He wrote both sacred and secular music, particularly madrigals; all of his surviving music is vocal. His sacred musical style was in conformance with the Counter-Reformation musical ideals following the Council of Trent, and his madrigals were related stylistically to those of Adrian Willaert and Cipriano de Rore.

== Life ==
Chamaterò was born in Rome. Details of his early life are lacking, including where he received his musical training. By 1560 he had come to northern Italy, where he held a succession of mostly short posts; there are gaps in the record for some portions of his career. In 1560 and 1561 he was in Padua, since he signed some of his published books of madrigals there. On January 1, 1562, he became maestro di cappella, music director, of the prestigious Accademia Filarmonica of Verona, succeeding Francesco Portinaro, who had held the post the preceding year. Chamaterò held this post for exactly two years, leaving at the end of 1563. In 1565 he was in Vicenza; 1566, Treviso; and he held a longer post as maestro di cappella in Udine from 1567 to 1570, and then again from 1574 to 1577, though his whereabouts between 1570 and 1574 are unknown. In 1578 he was again in Padua, and in 1581 and 1582 he was in Bergamo; no records of his activity have turned up after 1592.

All of Chamaterò's works were published in Venice, first by Antonio Gardano of the Gardano publishing house, and later by Scotto. Many are dedicated to colleagues and patrons of Chamaterò from the Accademia in Verona.

== Music ==
Chamaterò published six books of madrigals. The first two, printed in 1560 and 1561, he published through Antonio Gardano in Venice. He dedicated his first book, Il primo libro di madrigali for five voices, to the Count of Salò, Giberto Sanvitale, and the next book, Il primo libro di madrigali for four voices, to Gian Giacomo Trivultio. The other four books he all published while he was maestro in Udine, and it is likely that they are collections of music he had written during the time since his first publications. They include three books of madrigals for five voices, and one for four.

Stylistically Chamaterò's secular music resembles that of Adrian Willaert and Cipriano de Rore, the most famous madrigalists of the preceding generation working in the same geographical area, both in texture and in choice of poets such as Petrarch and his followers, such as Pietro Bembo. His sacred music shows the influence of the Venetian School, unsurprising as both Willaert and Rore were maestro di cappella at St. Marks's, and all of the locations at which Chamaterò worked were within the zone of influence of Venetian style. Chamaterò's sacred music includes a book of masses for five and seven voices, introits, Magnificats, and psalms, including works for multiple choirs of up to 12 voices. The music is post-Tridentine with emphasis on clarity of texture and text.

Chamaterò's music was held in high regard by his contemporaries, as can be seen both by the inclusion of his works in anthologies with more famous composers, and by the decision of other composers to dedicate some of their works to him.
