= Antonio Coma =

Italian composer

Antonio Coma (1560–1629) was an Italian composer. He was born in Cento, Ferrara, and came from a notable family of musicians. He may be the subject of a painting attributed to Guercino.

== Works, editions, recordings ==
- Sacrae Cantiones op.4 (Bologna, 1614) Claudio Cavina, Paolo Fanciullacci, Andrea Favari, Gianluca Ferrarini, Sergio Foresti. Dynamic. 1999
