= The Coma: Cutting Class =

2015 video game

- Developer: Devespresso Games
- Publishers: Devespresso Games (Cutting Class), Digerati Distribution (Recut edition)
- Platforms: Linux; Microsoft Windows; OS X PlayStation 4 Xbox One; Nintendo Switch
- Release: October 19, 2015 (Cutting Class, PC); September 22, 2017, (Recut, PC, PS4, Xbox One), December 21, 2017 (Nintendo Switch)
- Genre: Horror side scroller
- Mode: Single-player

The Coma: Cutting Class is a 2015 horror video game published by Devespresso Games. It was originally released in 2015, and a remastered edition titled The Coma: Recut was released on PC and consoles in 2017.

== Plot ==
After falling asleep in class, a student named Youngho awakens at night to find his school transformed into a terrifying landscape filled with monsters.

== Gameplay ==
The Coma is a side-scrolling horror game taking place at night in an abandoned school. The game does not feature combat, so the player needs to run and hide from enemies to avoid being killed. The player can also purchase drinks and snacks from vending machines to restore their health.

== Development ==
The plot of the game was partially inspired by the experiences of Minho, the key artist, when he was a student, with the director then adding horror elements.

The high expectations and pressure placed on students in Korea also helped to shape the plot, with director Minho Kim having a highly critical attitude towards the Korean education system.

The remastered console edition was first announced on July 12, 2017. It was announced on July 13, 2017 that Devespresso Games had partnered with Digerati to release The Coma: Recut.

== Reception ==
The remastered edition of The Coma received generally positive reviews from video game critics, with the Nintendo Switch version having a score of 62% on Metacritic.

Oliver Roderick of Switch Player awarded it a score of 3.5 out of 5, praising the story and atmosphere but also criticising the unresponsive controls during key gameplay moments.

Nintendo Life awarded it a more critical review of 6 out of 10, saying that while the concept was interesting, the execution was flawed. The review was particularly critical of the sections in which the player was chased by their teacher, claiming they lacked shock value.

Windows Central awarded it a score of 4 out of 5, praising the plot and atmosphere, but criticising the lack of voice acting.

== Sequel ==
A sequel titled The Coma 2: Vicious Sisters was released in 2020.
