= Ledesma, Castile and León =

Ledesma
- Municipality
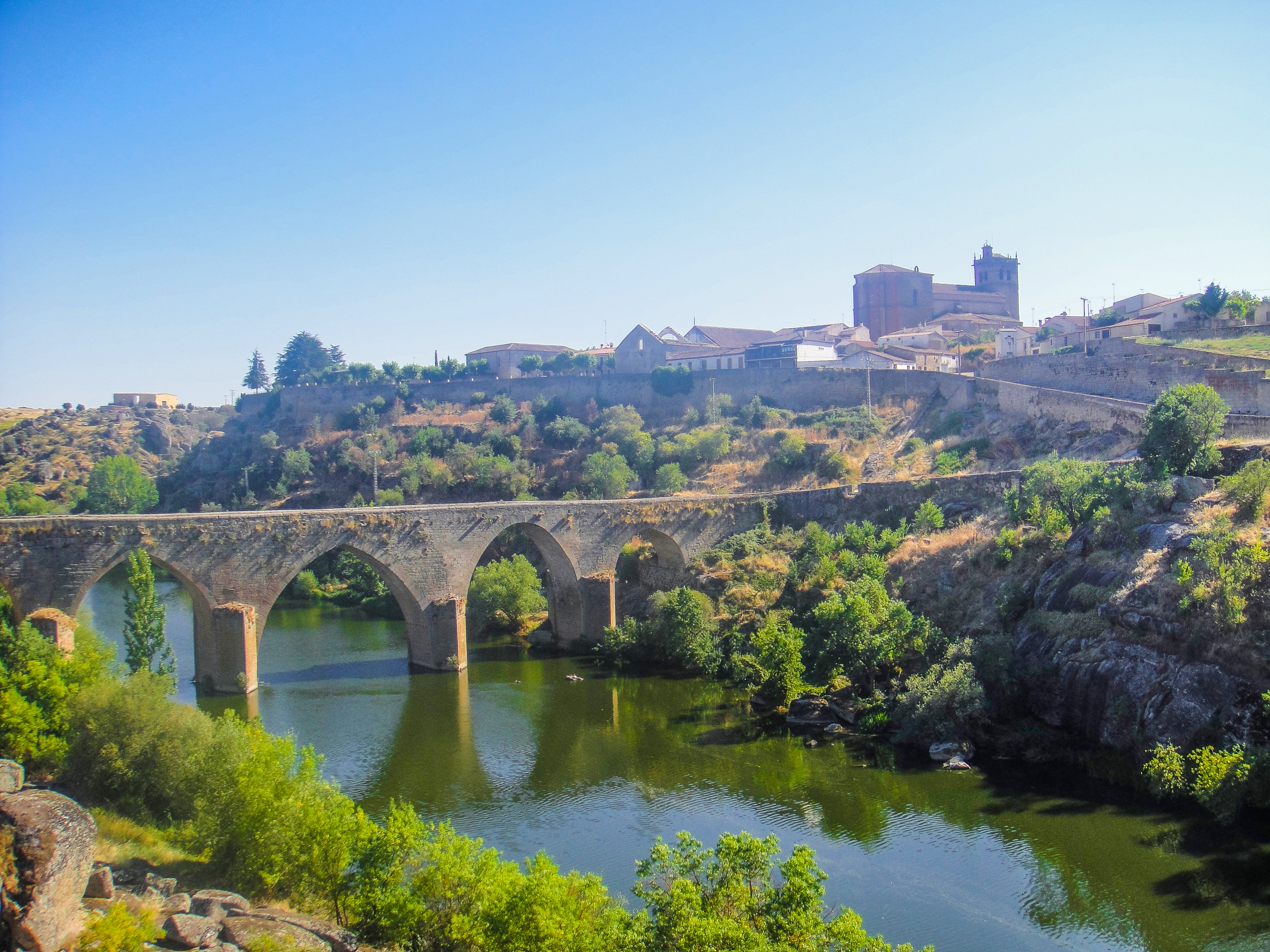

- Flag Coat of arms

- Location in Salamanca

- Location in Spain
- Coordinates: 41°05′15″N 6°00′00″W
- Country: Spain
- Autonomous community: Castile and León
- Province: Salamanca
- Comarca: Tierra de Ledesma

Government
  - Mayor: José Prieto (People's Party)

Area
  - Total: 141.22 km^{2} (54.53 sq mi)
- Elevation: 780 m (2,560 ft)

Population (2025-01-01)
  - Total: 1,480
  - Density: 10.5/km^{2} (27.1/sq mi)
- Time zone: UTC+1 (CET)
  - Summer (DST): UTC+2 (CEST)
- Postal code: 37100

Ledesma (Spanish pronunciation: [leˈðezma]) is a town in the province of Salamanca (Spain). According to the 2016 census there are 1,767 inhabitants. The municipality of Ledesma includes rural land and covers a total of 141.22 km^{2} (54.53 sq mi). Its altitude is 730 metres (2,400 ft) above sea level. Its postal code is 37100.

In ancient Roman times, the town was called Bletisa. It is possible that the Bletonesii lived in this area.

== Heritage ==
=== The Castle ===
What can be seen today of the building is a small part of the original. The entire wall that covered this fortress outside the walls has been lost. The part within the walls such as the accesses and towers connected it to an annex building, possibly a palace.

=== La Plaza de la Fortaleza ===
The Plaza de la Fortaleza is a large landscaped esplanade that shelters a series of subways, vaulted chambers, conduits, and powder magazines. There are cellars and water pipes of the palace which construction started in the late fifteenth century to early sixteenth century.

=== Casa Consistorial (Town Hall) ===
It is a building started in 1484, rectangular in shape and constituted as a large solid building and almost fortified in appearance.

=== Puente Mocho ===
The Mocho Bridge is located 3 km north of Ledesma, on the Roman road that linked Ledesma with Zamora to save the Cañedo riverbank. It has five semicircular arches. Its construction has been repeatedly attributed to Roman times.

=== Gothic and Renaissance palaces ===
There are several palaces that Ledesma preserves from the late fifteenth and early sixteenth centuries.

=== Iglesia de Santa María la Mayor (Church) ===
Begun to build in the last third of the 12th century in the final Romanesque style. Today, only the arch through which Calle de los Curas runs in the lower part of the tower remains.

The great extension that was made between 1492 and 1500 was commissioned to Juan Gil de Hontañón el Viejo and consists of the construction of the entire nave of the church up to the triumphal arch that separates it from the Main Chapel and the middle body of the tower, decorated with the typical Elizabethan balls.

The style of this work is considered one of the greatest exponents of the Spanish-Flemish Gothic style due to the ribbed vaults of "herringbone" and the risky curved arch of the back choir. In 1556 Juan Gil de Hontañón the Mozo was commissioned to build the highest part of the tower and the project of the Main Chapel, finally carried out by Pedro de Inestrosa and Pedro de Gamboa.

== See also ==
- List of municipalities in Salamanca
