= List of video games released in 2019 =

The following is a comprehensive index of all games released in 2019, sorted chronologically by release date, and divided by quarter. Information regarding developer, publisher, operating system, genre, and type of release is provided where available

For a summary of 2019 in video games as a whole, see 2019 in video games.

== Legend ==
Video game platforms
3DS	Nintendo 3DS, 3DS Virtual Console, iQue 3DS	DROID	Android	iOS	iOS, iPhone, iPod, iPadOS, iPad, visionOS, Apple Vision Pro
LIN	Linux, SteamOS	OSX	macOS	NS	Nintendo Switch
PS4	PlayStation 4	PSV	PlayStation Vita	PSVR	Playstation VR, PlayStation VR2
Quest	Meta Quest / Oculus Quest family, including Oculus Rift	Stadia	Google Stadia	tvOS	tvOS
Wii	Wii, WiiWare, Wii Virtual Console	WIN	Windows, all versions Windows 95 and up	XBO	Xbox One

Types of releases
Compilation	A compilation, anthology or collection of several titles, usually (but not always) belonging to the same series
Early access	A game launched in early access is unfinished and thus might contain bugs and glitches or have some of the content missing
Episodic	An episodic video game that is released in batches over a period of time
Expansion	A large-scale DLC to an already existing game that adds new story, areas and additions and/or changes to the game's mechanics
Full release	A full release of a game that launched in early access first
Limited	A special release (often called "Limited" or "Collector's Edition") with bonus collector's material. Often provided to people who pre-order a game
Port	The game first appeared on a different platform and a port was made. The game is like the original, with few or no differences
Remake	The game is an enhanced remake of an original, made using a new engine and/or assets and thus containing completely new sound, graphics and possibly changes to the story and/or gameplay
Remaster	The game is a remaster of an original, released on the same or different platform, with (usually minor) changes to graphics, sound and/or gameplay
Rerelease	The game was re-released on the same platform with no or only minor changes

Video game genres
Action	Action game	Action RPG	Action role-playing game	Action-adventure	Action-adventure game
Adventure	Adventure game	Battle royale	Battle royale game	Brawler	Beat 'em up
City builder	City-building game	CMS	Construction and management simulation	DCCG	Digital collectible card game
Deck building	Deck building game	Dungeon crawl	Dungeon crawl	Fighting	Fighting game
FPS	First-person shooter	Graphic adventure	Graphic adventure	Hack and slash	Hack and slash
Metroidvania	Metroidvania	MMO	Massively multiplayer online game	MOBA	Multiplayer online battle arena
Party	Party video game	PCA	Point-and-click adventure	Platformer	Platformer
Puzzle	Puzzle video game	Puzzle-platformer	Puzzle-platformer	Racing	Racing video game
Rhythm	Rhythm game	Roguelike	Roguelike, Roguelite	RPG	Role-playing video game
RTS	Real-time strategy	RTT	Real-time tactics	Run and gun	Run and gun game
Sandbox	Sandbox game	Shoot 'em up	Shoot 'em up	Simulation	Simulation video game
Sports	Sports video game	Stealth	Stealth game	Strategy	Strategy video game
Survival	Survival game	Survival horror	Survival horror	Tactical RPG	Tactical role-playing game
TBS	Turn-based strategy	TBT	Turn-based tactics	TPS	Third-person shooter
Vehicle sim	Vehicle simulation game	Vehicular combat	Vehicular combat game	Visual novel	Visual novel

== List ==
=== January–March ===
Release date	Title	Platform	Type	Genre	Developer	Publisher	Ref.
January 4	Fitness Boxing	NS		Fitness, Rhythm		Nintendo	
January 10	Catherine Classic	WIN		Puzzle		Sega	
January 11	Hitman HD Enhanced Collection	PS4, XBO		Stealth		Warner Bros. Interactive Entertainment	
January 11	Mario & Luigi: Bowser's Inside Story + Bowser Jr.'s Journey	3DS		RPG		Nintendo	
January 11	New Super Mario Bros. U Deluxe	NS		Platformer		Nintendo	
January 11	Tales of Vesperia: Definitive Edition	WIN, NS, PS4, XBO		RPG		Bandai Namco Entertainment	
January 12	Bright Memory	WIN		FPS		FYQD Personal Studio	
January 15	Asdivine Hearts 2	PS4, PSV		RPG		Kemco	
January 15	Onimusha: Warlords	WIN, NS, PS4, XBO		Action-adventure, Hack and slash		Capcom	
January 15	Vane	PS4		Adventure		Friend & Foe	
January 15	The Walking Dead: The Final Season – Episode 3: Broken Toys	WIN, NS, PS4, XBO		Graphic adventure		Skybound Entertainment	
January 16	Blaster Master	NS		Platformer, Run and gun, Metroidvania			
January 16	Joy Mech Fight (JP)	NS		Fighting			
January 16	Zelda II: The Adventure of Link	NS		Action RPG			
January 17	Yakuza 4 (JP)	PS4		Action-adventure		Sega	
January 17	YIIK: A Postmodern RPG	WIN, OSX, NS, PS4, PSV		RPG		Ysbryd Games	
January 18	Ace Combat 7: Skies Unknown	PS4, XBO		Vehicular combat (plane)		Bandai Namco Entertainment	
January 18	Alvastia Chronicles	WIN, XBO		RPG		Kemco	
January 18	Travis Strikes Again: No More Heroes	NS		Action-adventure		Grasshopper Manufacture	
January 22	Chaos;Child	WIN		Visual novel		Spike Chunsoft	
January 22	The Raven Remastered	NS		PCA		THQ Nordic	
January 22	Senran Kagura Burst Re:Newal	WIN, PS4		Action		Xseed Games	
January 23	At the Gates	WIN		4X, Strategy		Conifer Games	
January 23	The Invisible Guardian	WIN		Visual novel			
January 23	Slay the Spire	WIN, OSX, LIN		Roguelike		Humble Bundle	
January 24	Battlefleet Gothic: Armada 2	WIN		Strategy, RTT		Focus Home Interactive	
January 24	Life Is Strange 2 – Episode 2: Rules	WIN, PS4, XBO		Graphic adventure		Square Enix	
January 24	My Memory of Us	NS		Graphic adventure, Platformer		Crunching Koalas	
January 24	Pikuniku	WIN, NS		Puzzle-platformer		Devolver Digital	
January 24	Retro Mystery Club Vol.1: The Ise-Shima Case	NS		Adventure			
January 25	Resident Evil 2	WIN, PS4, XBO	Remake	Survival horror		Capcom	
January 29	Kingdom Hearts III	PS4, XBO		Action RPG		Square Enix	
January 29	Penguin Wars	PS4		Action		Dispatch Games	
January 29	Sphinx and the Cursed Mummy	NS		Action-adventure		THQ Nordic	
January 31	Dragon Marked For Death	NS		RPG		Inti Creates	
January 31	Piczle Colors	NS		Puzzle		Rainy Frog	
January 31	Planetarian: The Reverie of a Little Planet	NS		Visual novel		Prototype	
January 31	Robotics;Notes DaSH (JP)	NS, PS4		Visual novel		Spike Chunsoft	
January 31	Robotics;Notes Elite HD (JP)	NS, PS4		Visual novel		Spike Chunsoft	
January 31	Sunless Skies	WIN, OSX, LIN		RPG		Failbetter Games	
February 1	Ace Combat 7: Skies Unknown	WIN		Vehicular combat (plane)		Bandai Namco Entertainment	
February 1	Wargroove	WIN, NS, XBO		TBT		Chucklefish	
February 4	Apex Legends	WIN, PS4, XBO		Battle royale, FPS		Electronic Arts	
February 5	Art Sqool	WIN, OSX, NS		Art		RedDeerGames, Sonka	
February 5	The Book of Unwritten Tales 2	NS		PCA		THQ Nordic	
February 5	Etrian Odyssey Nexus	3DS		RPG, Dungeon crawl		Atlus	
February 5	V-Rally 4	NS		Racing		Bigben Interactive	
February 7	BlazBlue: Central Fiction	NS		Fighting		Arc System Works	
February 8	God Eater 3	WIN, PS4		Action RPG		Bandai Namco Entertainment	
February 8	Monster Energy Supercross – The Official Videogame 2	WIN, NS, PS4, XBO		Racing		Milestone srl	
February 9	Space Engineers	WIN		Simulation		Keen Software House	
February 12	Conarium	PS4, XBO		Adventure		Iceberg Interactive	
February 12	The King's Bird	NS, PS4, XBO		Platformer		Graffiti Games	
February 12	The Liar Princess and the Blind Prince	NS, PS4		Action-adventure		Nippon Ichi Software	
February 12	RIOT: Civil Unrest	WIN		RTS		Leonard Menchiari	
February 13	Eastshade	WIN		Adventure		Eastshade Studios	
February 13	Final Fantasy IX	NS, XBO		RPG		Square Enix	
February 13	Kirby's Adventure	NS		Platformer			
February 13	Super Mario Bros. 2	NS		Platformer			
February 13	Tetris 99	NS		Puzzle, Battle royale		Nintendo	
February 13	Tsuppari Ōzumō (JP)	NS		Sports (wrestling)			
February 15	Crackdown 3	WIN, XBO		Action-adventure		Xbox Game Studios	
February 15	DreamWorks Dragons Dawn of New Riders	WIN, NS, PS4, XBO		Action-adventure		Outright Games	
February 15	Far Cry New Dawn	WIN, PS4, XBO	Original	FPS		Ubisoft	
February 15	Jump Force	WIN, PS4, XBO		Fighting		Bandai Namco Entertainment	
February 15	Metro Exodus	WIN, PS4, XBO	Original	FPS		Deep Silver	
February 19	8-bit ADV Steins;Gate	NS		Visual novel		Spike Chunsoft	
February 19	Death end re;Quest	PS4		RPG		Idea Factory	
February 19	Steins;Gate Elite	WIN, NS, PS4		Visual novel		Spike Chunsoft	
February 19	Steins;Gate: Linear Bounded Phenogram	WIN, PS4		Visual novel		Spike Chunsoft	
February 19	Yakuza Kiwami	WIN		Action-adventure		Sega	
February 21	Aragami: Shadow Edition	NS		Action-adventure		Lince Works	
February 21	Phoenix Wright: Ace Attorney Trilogy (JP)	NS, PS4, XBO		Adventure, Visual novel		Capcom	
February 21	Spirit Hunter: NG (JP)	PS4		Adventure, Visual novel		Experience	
February 22	Anthem	WIN, PS4, XBO		Action RPG		Electronic Arts	
February 22	The Coin Game	WIN		Life sim		Devotid	
February 25	Touhou Luna Nights	WIN, XBO, NS		Action-adventure		Playism Active Gaming Media	
February 26	Dirt Rally 2.0	WIN, PS4, XBO		Racing		Codemasters	
February 26	The Lego Movie 2 Videogame	WIN, NS, PS4, XBO		Action-adventure		Warner Bros. Interactive Entertainment	
February 26	Stellaris: Console Edition	PS4, XBO		Grand strategy		Paradox Interactive	
February 26	Trials Rising	WIN, NS, PS4, XBO		Racing, Platformer		Ubisoft	
February 28	Deltarune: Chapter 1	NS, PS4		RPG, Adventure		Toby Fox	
February 28	Dies irae: Interview with Kaziklu Bey	WIN		Visual novel		Light	
March 1	Alien League	WIN		Party		Kraken Ink.	
March 1	Dead or Alive 6	WIN, PS4, XBO	Original	Fighting		Koei Tecmo	
March 1	Swords and Soldiers 2 Shawarmageddon	NS		Strategy		Ronimo Games	
March 1	ToeJam & Earl: Back in the Groove	WIN, OSX, LIN, NS, PS4, XBO		Action, Platformer		HumaNature Studios	
March 5	Left Alive	WIN, PS4		Action-adventure		Square Enix	
March 5	The Occupation	WIN, PS4, XBO		Stealth		Humble Bundle	
March 5	R.B.I. Baseball 19	NS, PS4, XBO		Sports		MLB Advanced Media	
March 6	Overload	XBO		FPS, Shoot 'em up		Revival Productions	
March 7	Flowers: Les Quatre Saisons (JP)	PS4		Visual novel		Prototype	
March 8	Devil May Cry 5	WIN, PS4, XBO	Original	Action-adventure, Hack and slash		Capcom	
March 8	Kirby's Extra Epic Yarn	3DS		Platformer		Nintendo	
March 12	The Caligula Effect: Overdose	WIN, NS, PS4		RPG		NIS America	
March 12	Hypnospace Outlaw	WIN		Adventure		Tendershoot	
March 12	Mystery Dungeon: Shiren the Wanderer (JP)	iOS		Roguelike		Spike Chunsoft	
March 13	Baba Is You	WIN, NS		Puzzle		Hempuli	
March 13	Fire Emblem: Shadow Dragon and the Blade of Light (JP)	NS		Tactical RPG			
March 13	Kid Icarus	NS		Action, Platformer			
March 13	StarTropics	NS		Action-adventure			
March 13	Yie Ar Kung-Fu (JP)	NS		Fighting			
March 14	Bonds of the Skies	WIN, NS, PS4		RPG		Kemco	
March 14	Mystery Dungeon: Shiren the Wanderer (JP)	DROID		Roguelike		Spike Chunsoft	
March 14	Samurai Warriors 4 DX (JP)	NS, PS4		Hack and slash		Koei Tecmo	
March 15	One Piece: World Seeker	WIN, PS4, XBO		Action-adventure		Bandai Namco Entertainment	
March 15	Sephirothic Stories	XBO		RPG, Puzzle		Kemco	
March 15	Tom Clancy's The Division 2	WIN, PS4, XBO		Action RPG		Ubisoft	
March 19	American Ninja Warrior: Challenge	NS, PS4, XBO		Action		GameMill Entertainment	
March 19	Fate/Extella Link	WIN, NS, PS4		Action-adventure		Xseed Games	
March 20	Chocobo's Mystery Dungeon Every Buddy!	NS, PS4		RPG, Roguelike		Square Enix	
March 20	Super Robot Wars T (JP)	NS, PS4		Tactical RPG		Bandai Namco Entertainment	
March 22	Sekiro: Shadows Die Twice	WIN, PS4, XBO		Action-adventure		Activision	
March 22	Unravel Two	NS		Platformer		Electronic Arts	
March 26	Final Fantasy VII	NS, XBO		RPG		Square Enix	
March 26	Generation Zero	WIN, PS4, XBO		Action-adventure, FPS		Avalanche Studios	
March 26	The Legend of Heroes: Trails of Cold Steel	PS4		RPG		Xseed Games	
March 26	MLB The Show 19	PS4		Sports		Sony Interactive Entertainment	
March 26	Nelke & the Legendary Alchemists: Ateliers of the New World	WIN, NS, PS4		RPG		Koei Tecmo	
March 26	Outward	WIN, PS4, XBO		Action RPG		Deep Silver	
March 26	Power Rangers: Battle for the Grid	NS, XBO		Fighting		nWay Games	
March 26	The Walking Dead: The Final Season – Episode 4: Take Us Back	WIN, NS, PS4, XBO		Graphic adventure		Skybound Entertainment	
March 26	Xenon Racer	WIN, NS, PS4, XBO		Racing		Soedesco	
March 28	Fun! Fun! Animal Park	NS		Party		Aksys Games	
March 29	Assassin's Creed III Remastered	WIN, PS4, XBO		Action-adventure, Stealth		Ubisoft	
March 29	Operencia: The Stolen Sun	WIN, XBO		RPG		Zen Studios	
March 29	Tropico 6	WIN, OSX, LIN		CMS, Government sim		Kalypso Media	
March 29	Unheard	WIN, OSX, LIN		Puzzle		NEXT Studios	
March 29	Yoshi's Crafted World	NS		Platformer		Nintendo	

=== April–June ===
Release date	Title	Platform	Type	Genre	Developer	Publisher	Ref.
April 1	Lovers of Aether	WIN		Dating sim		Dan Fornace	
April 2	Darksiders: Warmastered Edition	NS		Hack and slash, Action-adventure		THQ Nordic	
April 2	FAR: Lone Sails	PS4, XBO		Adventure		Mixtvision	
April 2	Power Rangers: Battle for the Grid	PS4		Fighting		nWay Games	
April 4	Frane: Dragons' Odyssey	XBO		Action RPG		Kemco	
April 4	Islanders	WIN, OSX, LIN		Casual, City builder		Grizzly Games	
April 4	Spirit Hunter: Death Mark	WIN		Adventure, Visual novel		Aksys Games	
April 5	Super Dragon Ball Heroes: World Mission	WIN, NS		DCCG		Bandai Namco Entertainment	
April 9	Dangerous Driving	WIN, PS4, XBO		Racing		Maximum Games	
April 9	Falcon Age	WIN, NS, PS4		Adventure		Outerloop Games	
April 9	Phoenix Wright: Ace Attorney Trilogy	WIN, NS, PS4, XBO		Adventure, Visual novel		Capcom	
April 9	Zanki Zero: Last Beginning	WIN, PS4		RPG, Dungeon crawl		Spike Chunsoft	
April 10	Punch-Out!!	NS		Sports (boxing)			
April 10	Star Soldier	NS		Scrolling shooter			
April 10	Super Mario Bros.: The Lost Levels	NS		Platformer			
April 11	Earth Defense Force: Iron Rain	PS4		Action		D3 Publisher	
April 11	Hellblade: Senua's Sacrifice	NS		Action-adventure		Ninja Theory	
April 12	Code 7: Episode 2 — Memory and Episode 3 — Backdoor	WIN, OSX, LIN		Adventure		Goodwolf Studio	
April 12	Nintendo Labo Toy-Con 04: VR Kit	NS		—N/a		Nintendo	
April 13	Konami Arcade Classics	WIN, NS, PS4, XBO		Platformer, Shoot 'em up		Konami	
April 16	Anno 1800	WIN		City builder, RTS		Ubisoft	
April 16	Final Fantasy X/X-2 HD Remaster	NS, XBO		RPG		Square Enix	
April 16	My Time at Portia	NS, PS4, XBO		Sandbox		Team17	
April 16	Table of Tales: The Crooked Crown	PSVR		Digital tabletop, RPG		Tin Man Games	
April 16	World War Z	WIN, PS4, XBO		Survival horror, TPS		Mad Dog Games	
April 18	Cuphead	NS		Run and gun		StudioMDHR	
April 18	Driftland: The Magic Revival	WIN		RTS		Star Drifters	
April 18	Katana Zero	WIN, NS		Hack and slash, Platformer		Devolver Digital	
April 23	Dragon's Dogma: Dark Arisen	NS		Action RPG, Hack and slash		Capcom	
April 23	Mortal Kombat 11	WIN, NS, PS4, XBO		Fighting		Warner Bros. Interactive Entertainment	
April 25	Imperator: Rome	WIN		Grand strategy		Paradox Interactive	
April 25	Picross S3	NS		Puzzle		Jupiter Corporation	
April 25	SteamWorld Quest: Hand of Gilgamech	NS		RPG			
April 25	Umihara Kawase Fresh! (JP)	NS		Action		Nicalis	
April 26	BoxBoy! + BoxGirl!	NS		Puzzle-platformer		Nintendo	
April 26	Days Gone	PS4	Original	Action-adventure, Survival horror		Sony Interactive Entertainment	
April 30	Final Fantasy XII: The Zodiac Age	NS, XBO		RPG		Square Enix	
April 30	UBOAT	WIN		Vehicle sim (submarine)		PlayWay S.A.	
May 1	Arknights (CN)	iOS, DROID		Tactical RPG, Tower defense		Hypergryph	
May 1	Detective Di: The Silk Rose Murders	WIN, LIN		PCA		Nupixo Games	
May 2	Close to the Sun	WIN		Adventure, Survival horror		Wired Productions	
May 2	Rise of Industry	WIN, OSX, LIN		Business sim		Kasedo Games	
May 3	Jump King	WIN		Platformer		Nexile	
May 7	Puyo Puyo Champions	WIN, NS, PS4, XBO		Puzzle		Sega	
May 7	Shakedown: Hawaii	WIN, NS, PS4, PSV		Action-adventure		Vblank Entertainment	
May 9	Life Is Strange 2 – Episode 3: Wastelands	WIN, PS4, XBO		Graphic adventure		Square Enix	
May 9	Yakuza Kiwami 2	WIN		Action-adventure		Sega	
May 10	Saints Row: The Third – The Full Package	NS		Action-adventure, TPS		Deep Silver	
May 14	Darkwood	PS4		Survival horror, Action-adventure		Acid Wizard Studio	
May 14	Idle Coffee Corp	iOS, DROID		Incremental		BoomBit	
May 14	A Plague Tale: Innocence	WIN, PS4, XBO		Action-adventure, Puzzle		Focus Home Interactive	
May 14	Rage 2	WIN, PS4, XBO	Original	FPS		Bethesda Softworks	
May 14	Redout	NS		Racing		Nicalis	
May 14	Sniper Elite V2 Remastered	WIN, NS, PS4, XBO		TPS		Rebellion Developments	
May 14	World End Syndrome	NS, PS4		Visual novel		Arc System Works	
May 15	Clu Clu Land	NS		Puzzle			
May 15	Clu Clu Land: Welcome to New Cluclu Land (JP)	NS		Puzzle			
May 15	Donkey Kong Jr.	NS		Platformer			
May 15	Vs. Excitebike	NS		Racing			
May 16	Bubsy: Paws on Fire!	WIN, PS4		Platformer		UFO Interactive Games	
May 16	Castlevania Anniversary Collection	WIN, NS, PS4, XBO		Platformer		Konami	
May 16	Darkwood	NS		Survival horror, Action-adventure		Acid Wizard Studio	
May 17	Darkwood	XBO		Survival horror, Action-adventure		Acid Wizard Studio	
May 21	Assassin's Creed III Remastered	NS		Action-adventure, Stealth		Ubisoft	
May 21	Atelier Lulua: The Scion of Arland	WIN, NS, PS4		RPG		Koei Tecmo	
May 21	Beat Saber	WIN, PS4, Quest		Rhythm		Beat Games	
May 21	Dauntless	WIN, PS4, XBO		Action RPG		Epic Games	
May 21	Observation	WIN, PS4		Adventure, Puzzle		Devolver Digital	
May 21	Resident Evil	NS	Port	Survival horror		Capcom	
May 21	Resident Evil 4	NS	Port	Survival horror, TPS		Capcom	
May 21	Resident Evil Zero	NS	Port	Survival horror		Capcom	
May 21	Slay the Spire	PS4		Deck building (roguelike)		Humble Bundle	
May 21	Team Sonic Racing	WIN, NS, PS4, XBO		Racing (kart)		Sega	
May 22	Pokémon Rumble Rush	DROID		Action		The Pokémon Company	
May 23	Total War: Three Kingdoms	WIN		TBS, RTT		Sega	
May 27	Little Friends: Dogs & Cats	NS		Simulation		Imagineer	
May 28	Among the Sleep: Enhanced Edition	NS, PS4, XBO		Survival horror, Action-adventure		Krillbite Studio	
May 28	Blood & Truth	PS4		FPS		Sony Interactive Entertainment	
May 28	Brothers: A Tale of Two Sons	NS		Adventure		505 Games	
May 28	Crystal Crisis	NS		Puzzle		Nicalis	
May 28	The House in Fata Morgana: Dream of the Revenants Edition	PSV		Visual novel		Mighty Rabbit Studios	
May 28	Layers of Fear 2	WIN, PS4, XBO		Adventure, Horror		Gun Media	
May 28	Void Bastards	WIN, XBO		FPS, Roguelike	Blue Manchu	Humble Bundle	
May 29	Vectronom	WIN, OSX, NS		Rhythm		ARTE Experience	
May 30	Outer Wilds	WIN, XBO		Adventure		Annapurna Interactive	
May 31	Cricket 19	NS, PS4, XBO		Sports		Big Ant Studios	
May 31	Global Soccer Manager 2019	WIN		Sports		Forever Young Games	
May 31	PixARK	WIN, NS, PS4, XBO		Sandbox		Snail Games	
May 31	Trover Saves the Universe	PS4		Action, Platformer		Squanch Games	
June 4	Asdivine Dios	WIN, XBO		RPG		Kemco	
June 4	Kotodama: The 7 Mysteries of Fujisawa	WIN, NS, PS4		Visual novel		PQube	
June 4	The Legend of Heroes: Trails of Cold Steel II	PS4		RPG		Xseed Games	
June 4	Perchang	NS		Puzzle, Strategy		Perchang Games	
June 4	Persona Q2: New Cinema Labyrinth	3DS		Dungeon crawl, RPG		Atlus	
June 4	The Seven Deadly Sins: Grand Cross (KR, JP)	iOS, DROID, WIN		Tactical RPG	Netmarble	Netmarble	
June 4	Timespinner	NS		Metroidvania		Lunar Ray Games	
June 4	Trover Saves the Universe	WIN		Action, Platformer		Squanch Games	
June 4	Warhammer: Chaosbane	WIN, PS4, XBO		RPG		Bigben Interactive	
June 6	Journey	WIN		Adventure, Art		Annapurna Interactive	
June 6	MotoGP 19	WIN, PS4, XBO		Racing		Milestone srl	
June 6	Slay the Spire	NS		Deck building (roguelike)		Humble Bundle	
June 7	A-Train Express	PS4, PSVR		Simulation		Degica Games	
June 7	Octopath Traveler	WIN		RPG		Square Enix	
June 7	Omensight	XBO		Action RPG		Spearhead Games	
June 11	Battle Worlds: Kronos	NS		TBS		THQ Nordic	
June 11	Collection of Mana	NS		Action RPG		Square Enix	
June 11	Contra Anniversary Collection	WIN, NS, PS4, XBO		Action, Platformer		Konami	
June 11	The House in Fata Morgana: Dream of the Revenants Edition	PS4		Visual novel		Mighty Rabbit Studios	
June 12	City Connection	NS		Platformer			
June 12	Double Dragon II: The Revenge	NS		Brawler			
June 12	Volleyball	NS		Sports			
June 13	Cadence of Hyrule	NS		Roguelike, Rhythm		Nintendo	
June 13	Doraemon Story of Seasons (JP)	NS		Farming, RPG		Bandai Namco Entertainment	
June 14	Blaster Master Zero	WIN		Action, Platformer		Inti Creates	
June 18	Bloodstained: Ritual of the Night	WIN, PS4, XBO		Metroidvania, Action-adventure		505 Games	
June 18	Crystal Crisis	PS4		Puzzle		Nicalis	
June 20	198X	WIN, PS4		Action		Hi-Bit Studios	
June 20	Amid Evil	WIN		FPS		New Blood Interactive	
June 20	Harry Potter: Wizards Unite	iOS, DROID		Adventure		Niantic	
June 20	My Friend Pedro	WIN, NS		Shoot 'em up		Devolver Digital	
June 20	Project Lux	PS4		Adventure		Sekai Project	
June 20	Super Neptunia RPG	WIN		RPG		Idea Factory	
June 20	Yakuza 5 (JP)	PS4		Action-adventure		Sega	
June 20	Yo-kai Watch 4 (JP)	NS		RPG		Level-5	
June 21	Crash Team Racing Nitro-Fueled	NS, PS4, XBO		Racing (kart)		Activision	
June 24	Heavy Rain	WIN		Interactive drama		Sony Interactive Entertainment	
June 25	Bloodstained: Ritual of the Night	NS		Metroidvania, Action-adventure		505 Games	
June 25	Devil May Cry	NS		Action-adventure, Hack and slash		Capcom	
June 25	Judgment	PS4		Action-adventure		Sega	
June 25	Samurai Shodown	PS4, XBO	Original	Fighting		Athlon Games	
June 25	Super Neptunia RPG	NS, PS4		RPG		Idea Factory	
June 26	Hardcore Mecha	WIN, PS4		Action, Vehicle sim (mech)		Arc System Works	
June 26	Human: Fall Flat	iOS, DROID		Puzzle-platformer		505 Games	
June 27	Minit	iOS, DROID		Adventure		Devolver Digital	
June 27	MotoGP 19	NS		Racing		Milestone srl	
June 27	The Sinking City	WIN, PS4, XBO		Action-adventure, Survival horror		Bigben Interactive	
June 28	F1 2019	WIN, PS4, XBO		Racing		Codemasters	
June 28	Super Mario Maker 2	NS		Level editor, Platformer		Nintendo	

=== July–September ===
Release date	Title	Platform	Type	Genre	Developer	Publisher	Ref.
July 2	Final Fantasy XIV: Shadowbringers	WIN, PS4		MMO, RPG		Square Enix	
July 2	Psyvariar Delta	NS, PS4		Shoot 'em up		Dispatch Games	
July 2	Red Faction: Guerrilla Re-Mars-tered	NS		TPS, Action-adventure		THQ Nordic	
July 4	Alternate Jake Hunter: Daedalus The Awakening of Golden Jazz	WIN		Adventure		Arc System Works	
July 4	Clannad	NS		Visual novel		Prototype	
July 4	Stranger Things 3: The Game	WIN, NS, PS4, XBO		Brawler		Netflix	
July 5	Attack on Titan 2: Final Battle	WIN, NS, PS4, XBO		Action		Koei Tecmo	
July 5	Sea of Solitude	WIN, PS4, XBO		Adventure		Electronic Arts	
July 5	Teppen	iOS, DROID		DCCG		GungHo Online Entertainment	
July 9	Dr. Mario World	iOS, DROID		Puzzle		Nintendo	
July 9	Senran Kagura: Peach Ball	NS		Pinball		Xseed Games	
July 9	Umihara Kawase Fresh!	NS		Action, Platformer		Nicalis	
July 11	Blazing Chrome	WIN, NS, PS4, XBO		Run and gun		The Arcade Crew	
July 11	Earth Defense Force 5	WIN		TPS		D3 Publisher	
July 11	Tiny Metal: Full Metal Rumble	WIN, NS		TBT		Unties	
July 12	Aggelos	PS4, XBO		Action, Platformer		PQube	
July 12	Dragon Quest Builders 2	NS, PS4		Action RPG, Sandbox		Square Enix	
July 12	God Eater 3	NS		Action RPG		Bandai Namco Entertainment	
July 17	Donkey Kong 3	NS		Shoot 'em up			
July 17	Wrecking Crew	NS		Action, Puzzle			
July 18	Etherborn	WIN, NS, PS4, XBO		Puzzle		Altered Matter	
July 18	Sky: Children of the Light	iOS		Adventure		Thatgamecompany	
July 19	Horace	WIN		Metroidvania, Platformer		505 Games	
July 19	Marvel Ultimate Alliance 3: The Black Order	NS		Action RPG		Nintendo	
July 22	Beyond: Two Souls	WIN		Interactive drama		Quantic Dream	
July 23	Pokémon Rumble Rush	iOS		Action		The Pokémon Company	
July 23	Tetris Effect	WIN		Puzzle		Enhance Games	
July 23	Vane	WIN		Adventure		Friend & Foe	
July 25	Hyper Light Drifter	iOS		Action RPG		Abylight Studios	
July 25	Monster Boy and the Cursed Kingdom	WIN		Platformer		FDG Entertainment	
July 25	Raiden V: Director's Cut	NS		Shoot 'em up		UFO Interactive Games	
July 26	Fire Emblem: Three Houses	NS		Tactical RPG		Nintendo	
July 26	Kill la Kill: If	WIN, NS, PS4		Action, Fighting		Arc System Works	
July 26	Wolfenstein: Cyberpilot	WIN, PS4		FPS, Action-adventure		Bethesda Softworks	
July 26	Wolfenstein: Youngblood	WIN, NS, PS4, XBO	Original	FPS		Bethesda Softworks	
July 30	Mutant Year Zero: Road to Eden: Deluxe Edition	NS		TBS		Funcom	
July 30	Oxygen Not Included	WIN, OSX, LIN		Survival, Simulation		Klei Entertainment	
July 31	Crystal Crisis	WIN		Puzzle		Nicalis	
August 1	Omega Labyrinth Life	WIN, NS, PS4		RPG, Dungeon crawl		D3Publisher	
August 2	The Church in the Darkness	WIN, OSX, NS, PS4, XBO		Action-adventure		Fellow Traveler	
August 2	Dry Drowning	WIN		Visual novel		VLG Publishing	
August 2	Madden NFL 20	WIN, PS4, XBO		Sports		EA Sports	
August 3	Asdivine Menace	XBO		RPG		Kemco	
August 6	Age of Wonders: Planetfall	WIN, PS4, XBO		4X, TBS		Paradox Interactive	
August 6	The Angry Birds Movie 2 VR: Under Pressure	PS4		Party	XR Games	Rovio Entertainment	
August 6	Illusion of L'Phalcia	PS4		RPG		Kemco	
August 6	Metal Wolf Chaos XD	WIN, PS4, XBO		TPS		Devolver Digital	
August 8	Pillars of Eternity: Complete Edition	NS		RPG		Versus Evil	
August 9	Sword Art Online: Fatal Bullet Complete Edition	NS		Action RPG		Bandai Namco Entertainment	
August 12	Anodyne 2: Return to Dust	WIN, OSX, LIN		Action-adventure		Analgesic Productions	
August 13	The Bard's Tale Trilogy	XBO		Roguelike		inXile Entertainment	
August 13	Friday the 13th: The Game	NS		Survival horror		Gun Media	
August 13	Rebel Galaxy Outlaw	WIN		Vehicle sim (spaceship)		Double Damage Games	
August 15	Ion Fury	WIN, OSX, LIN		FPS		3D Realms	
August 15	Vasara HD Collection	NS, PS4, XBO		Shoot 'em up		QUByte Interactive	
August 16	Grandia HD Collection	NS		RPG		GungHo Online Entertainment	
August 18	FAR: Lone Sails	NS		Adventure		Mixtvision	
August 20	Rad	WIN, NS, PS4, XBO		Roguelike		Bandai Namco Entertainment	
August 20	Remnant: From the Ashes	WIN, PS4, XBO		TPS, Action-adventure		Perfect World Entertainment	
August 20	Yakuza 3	PS4		Action-adventure		Sega	
August 20	Yu-Gi-Oh! Legacy of the Duelist: Link Evolution	NS		TBS		Konami	
August 21	Downtown Nekketsu March: Super-Awesome Field Day! (JP)	NS		Action, Sports			
August 21	Kung-Fu Heroes	NS		Brawler			
August 21	Vice: Project Doom	NS		Fighting, Platformer, Racing, Shooter			
August 21	Winds of Change	WIN		Visual novel, RPG, Adventure		Crunching Koalas	
August 22	Life Is Strange 2 – Episode 4: Faith	WIN, PS4, XBO		Graphic adventure		Square Enix	
August 22	Oninaki	WIN, NS, PS4		RPG		Square Enix	
August 22	Tokyo Chronos (JP)	PS4		Adventure		Sekai Project	
August 22	Touhou Shoujo: Tale of Beautiful Memories	WIN		Action RPG		DLsite	
August 27	Ancestors: The Humankind Odyssey	WIN		Survival	Panache Digital Games	Private Division	
August 27	The Bard's Tale IV: Director's Cut	WIN, OSX, LIN, PS4, XBO		Roguelike		inXile Entertainment	
August 27	Control	WIN, PS4, XBO		TPS, Action-adventure		505 Games	
August 27	Crystar	WIN, PS4		Action RPG		Spike Chunsoft	
August 27	Hunt: Showdown	WIN		FPS, Survival horror		Crytek	
August 27	Knights and Bikes	WIN, PS4		Action-adventure		Double Fine	
August 27	Minoria	WIN, NS		Metroidvania		Dangen Entertainment	
August 27	MXGP 2019	WIN, PS4, XBO		Racing		Milestone srl	
August 27	World of Warcraft Classic	WIN, OSX		RPG		Blizzard Entertainment	
August 28	Pokémon Masters	iOS, DROID		RPG		DeNA	
August 29	Azur Lane: Crosswave (JP)	PS4		Action RPG		Idea Factory	
August 29	Cell to Singularity	iOS		Incremental, Educational			
August 30	Astral Chain	NS		Action		Nintendo	
August 30	Blair Witch	WIN, XBO		Survival horror		Lionsgate Games	
August 30	The Dark Pictures: Man of Medan	WIN, PS4, XBO	Original	Adventure, Survival horror		Bandai Namco Entertainment	
August 30	The Ninja Saviors: Return of the Warriors	NS, PS4		Brawler		ININ Games	
August 30	Psychedelica of the Ashen Hawk	WIN		Visual novel		Intragames, Idea Factory	
September 3	Catherine: Full Body	PS4		Puzzle-platformer		Atlus	
September 3	Children of Morta	WIN, OSX		Action RPG		11 Bit Studios	
September 3	Final Fantasy VIII Remastered	WIN, NS, PS4, XBO		RPG		Square Enix	
September 3	Last Oasis	WIN		Survival		Donkey Crew	
September 3	Root Letter: Last Answer	NS, PS4		Visual novel		PQube	
September 3	Spyro Reignited Trilogy	WIN, NS		Platformer		Activision	
September 4	Deadly Premonition: Origins	NS		Survival horror		Rising Star Games	
September 4	Divinity: Original Sin II	NS		RPG		Bandai Namco Entertainment	
September 4	Super Kirby Clash	NS		Action		Nintendo	
September 5	Brawl Brothers	NS		Brawler			
September 5	Breath of Fire	NS		RPG			
September 5	Demon's Crest	NS		Platformer			
September 5	F-Zero	NS		Racing			
September 5	Joe & Mac 2: Lost in the Tropics	NS		Action, Platformer			
September 5	Kirby's Dream Course	NS		Sports (Mini golf)			
September 5	Kirby's Dream Land 3	NS		Platformer			
September 5	The Legend of Zelda: A Link to the Past	NS		Action-adventure			
September 5	Pilotwings	NS		Vehicle sim (plane)			
September 5	River City Girls	WIN, NS, PS4, XBO		Brawler		Arc System Works	
September 5	Star Fox	NS		Rail Shooter			
September 5	Stunt Race FX	NS		Racing			
September 5	Super E.D.F. Earth Defense Force	NS		Scrolling shooter			
September 5	Super Family Tennis (JP)	NS		Sports (Tennis)			
September 5	Super Ghouls 'n Ghosts	NS		Platformer			
September 5	Super Mario Kart	NS		Racing (kart)			
September 5	Super Mario World	NS		Platformer			
September 5	Super Mario World 2: Yoshi's Island	NS		Platformer			
September 5	Super Metroid	NS		Action-adventure			
September 5	Super Puyo Puyo 2	NS		Puzzle			
September 5	Super Soccer	NS		Sports (Soccer)			
September 5	Super Tennis	NS		Sports (Tennis)			
September 6	Monster Hunter World: Iceborne	PS4, XBO		Action-adventure		Capcom	
September 6	NBA 2K20	WIN, NS, PS4, XBO		Sports		2K Sports	
September 10	Caravan Stories	PS4		MMO, RPG		Aiming	
September 10	eFootball Pro Evolution Soccer 2020	WIN, PS4, XBO		Sports		Konami	
September 10	Gears 5	WIN, XBO	Original	TPS		Xbox Game Studios	
September 10	GreedFall	WIN, PS4, XBO		Action RPG		Focus Home Interactive	
September 10	Utawarerumono: Zan	PS4		Action RPG, Brawler		NIS America	
September 13	Borderlands 3	WIN, PS4, XBO		FPS		2K Games	
September 13	Daemon X Machina	NS		Action, TPS		Nintendo	
September 13	NHL 20	PS4, XBO		Sports		EA Sports	
September 17	AI: The Somnium Files	WIN, NS, PS4		Adventure		Spike Chunsoft	
September 17	Lego Jurassic World	NS		Action-adventure		Warner Bros. Interactive Entertainment	
September 17	Reel Fishing: Road Trip Adventure	NS, PS4		Fishing		Natsume Inc.	
September 18	Merge Magic!	iOS, DROID		Puzzle, Adventure		Gram Games	
September 19	Devil May Cry 2	NS		Action-adventure, Hack and slash		Capcom	
September 19	Sayonara Wild Hearts	NS, PS4		Music		Annapurna Interactive	
September 19	Shakedown: Hawaii	3DS		Action-adventure		Vblank Entertainment	
September 19	Shantae and the Seven Sirens	iOS		Platformer		WayForward	
September 19	Sonic Racing	iOS		Racing		Sega	
September 20	The Legend of Zelda: Link's Awakening	NS		Action-adventure		Nintendo	
September 20	Ni no Kuni: Wrath of the White Witch	NS		RPG		Bandai Namco Entertainment	
September 20	Ni no Kuni: Wrath of the White Witch Remastered	WIN, PS4		RPG		Bandai Namco Entertainment	
September 20	Untitled Goose Game	WIN, NS		Stealth		Panic Inc.	
September 24	Baldur's Gate II: Enhanced Edition	NS, PS4, XBO		RPG		Skybound Games	
September 24	Baldur's Gate: Enhanced Edition	NS, PS4, XBO		RPG		Skybound Games	
September 24	Baldur's Gate: Siege of Dragonspear	NS, PS4, XBO		RPG		Skybound Games	
September 24	Contra: Rogue Corps	WIN, NS, PS4, XBO		Run and gun		Konami	
September 24	Icewind Dale: Enhanced Edition	NS, PS4, XBO		RPG		Skybound Games	
September 24	Planescape: Torment: Enhanced Edition	NS, PS4, XBO		RPG		Skybound Games	
September 24	The Surge 2	WIN, PS4, XBO		Action RPG		Focus Home Interactive	
September 25	Mario Kart Tour	iOS, DROID		Racing (kart)		Nintendo	
September 26	Darksiders II: Deathinitive Edition	NS		Action RPG, Hack and slash		THQ Nordic	
September 26	Gunvolt Chronicles: Luminous Avenger iX	WIN, NS, PS4		Action, Platformer		Inti Creates	
September 26	Ys IX: Monstrum Nox (JP)	PS4		RPG		Nihon Falcom	
September 27	Code Vein	WIN, PS4, XBO		Action RPG		Bandai Namco Entertainment	
September 27	Dragon Quest	NS		RPG		Square Enix	
September 27	Dragon Quest II	NS		RPG		Square Enix	
September 27	Dragon Quest III	NS		RPG		Square Enix	
September 27	Dragon Quest XI S	NS		RPG		Nintendo	
September 27	FIFA 20	WIN, NS, PS4, XBO		Sports		EA Sports	
September 27	Freedom Finger	WIN, NS, PS4, XBO		Shoot 'em up		Wide Right Interactive	
September 27	Memorrha	WIN, OSX, NS, PS4, XBO		Puzzle, Adventure		StickyStoneStudio	
September 27	Ori and the Blind Forest	NS		Platformer		Microsoft Studios	
September 27	Tropico 6	PS4, XBO		CMS		Kalypso Media	
September 30	Cube World	WIN		Action RPG		Picroma	

=== October–December ===
Release date	Title	Platform	Type	Genre	Developer	Publisher	Ref.
October 1	Call of Duty: Mobile	iOS, DROID		FPS, Battle royale		Activision	
October 1	Destiny 2: Shadowkeep	WIN, PS4, XBO		Action RPG, FPS		Bungie	
October 1	Mobile Suit Gundam: Battle Operation 2	PS4		Action		Bandai Namco Entertainment	
October 1	ReadySet Heroes	WIN, PS4		Action		Sony Interactive Entertainment	
October 1	What the Golf?	WIN, iOS		Puzzle		The Label	
October 1	YU-NO: A Girl Who Chants Love at the Bound of this World	WIN, NS, PS4		Adventure, Visual novel		Spike Chunsoft	
October 2	One Night Stand	PS4, XBO		Visual novel		Ratalaika Games	
October 2	Warsaw	WIN, NS, PS4, XBO		Action RPG		Pixelated Milk	
October 3	Fault Milestone One	NS		Visual novel		Sekai Project	
October 4	Ciconia When They Cry – Phase 1: For You, the Replaceable Ones	WIN, OSX		Visual novel		07th Expansion, MangaGamer	
October 4	Ghostbusters: The Video Game Remastered	WIN, NS, PS4, XBO		TPS		Mad Dog Games	
October 4	One Night Stand	NS		Visual novel		Ratalaika Games	
October 4	Tom Clancy's Ghost Recon Breakpoint	WIN, PS4, XBO		Tactical shooter		Ubisoft	
October 7	Shantae and the Seven Sirens	OSX		Platformer		WayForward	
October 8	The Alliance Alive HD Remastered	NS, PS4		RPG		NIS America	
October 8	BurgerTime Party!	NS		Action, Puzzle		Xseed Games	
October 8	Concrete Genie	PS4		Action-adventure		Sony Interactive Entertainment	
October 8	Indivisible	WIN, PS4, XBO		Action RPG		505 Games	
October 8	John Wick Hex	WIN, OSX		Action, Strategy		Good Shepherd Entertainment	
October 8	Trine 4: The Nightmare Prince	WIN, NS, PS4, XBO		Platformer		Modus Games	
October 8	Yooka-Laylee and the Impossible Lair	WIN, NS, PS4, XBO		Platformer		Team17	
October 10	Corpse Party: Blood Drive	WIN, NS		Survival horror		Marvelous USA / Marvelous Europe	
October 10	Moon: Remix RPG Adventure (JP)	NS		RPG		Onion Games	
October 10	Murder on the Island	WIN		Visual novel		Forever Young Games	
October 10	River City Melee Mach!!	WIN, NS, PS4		Action		Arc System Works	
October 10	Spirit Hunter: NG	WIN, NS, PS4, PSV		Adventure, Visual novel		Aksys Games	
October 10	Valfaris	WIN, NS		Action, Platformer		Merge Games	
October 11	Doraemon Story of Seasons	WIN, NS		Farming, RPG		Bandai Namco Entertainment	
October 11	Frostpunk	PS4, XBO		City builder		11 Bit Studios	
October 11	Grid	WIN, PS4, XBO		Racing		Codemasters	
October 11	Killer Queen Black	WIN, NS		RTS		BumbleBear Games	
October 15	Children of Morta	PS4, XBO		Action RPG		11 Bit Studios	
October 15	Disco Elysium	WIN		RPG		ZA/UM	
October 15	Earth Defense Force: Iron Rain	WIN		TPS		D3 Publisher	
October 15	Grandia HD Remaster	WIN		RPG		GungHo Online Entertainment	
October 15	Overwatch: Legendary Edition	NS		FPS		Blizzard Entertainment	
October 15	Steins;Gate Elite (JP)	iOS		Visual novel		Mages	
October 15	The Witcher 3: Wild Hunt Complete Edition	NS		Action RPG		Warner Bros. Interactive Entertainment	
October 16	Little Town Hero	NS		RPG		Game Freak	
October 17	The Jackbox Party Pack 6	WIN, OSX, LIN, NS, PS4, XBO		Party		Jackbox Games	
October 17	Monkey King: Hero is Back	WIN, PS4		Action-adventure		THQ Nordic	
October 17	Stranded Sails: Explorers of the Cursed Islands	WIN, NS, PS4, XBO		Adventure		rokaplay, Merge Games	
October 17	Travis Strikes Again: No More Heroes Complete Edition	WIN, PS4		Action-adventure		Marvelous	
October 17	Vectronom	iOS, DROID		Rhythm		ARTE Experience	
October 18	Digimon Story Cyber Sleuth: Complete Edition	WIN, NS		RPG		Bandai Namco Entertainment	
October 18	Ice Age: Scrat's Nutty Adventure	WIN, NS, PS4, XBO		Platformer		Outright Games	
October 18	Plants vs Zombies: Battle for Neighborville	WIN, PS4, XBO		TPS		Electronic Arts	
October 18	Return of the Obra Dinn	NS, PS4, XBO		Puzzle		3909	
October 18	Ring Fit Adventure	NS		Adventure, Fitness		Nintendo	
October 22	The Legend of Heroes: Trails of Cold Steel III	PS4		RPG		Xseed Games	
October 22	Raging Loop	NS, PS4		Visual novel		PQube	
October 22	Skullgirls 2nd Encore	NS		Fighting		Skybound Games	
October 22	WWE 2K20	WIN, PS4, XBO		Sports		2K Sports	
October 23	Corpse Party 2: Dead Patient – Chapter 1	WIN		Survival horror		Xseed Games, Marvelous USA	
October 24	Dusk Diver	NS, PS4		Action RPG		PQube	
October 25	Call of Duty: Modern Warfare	WIN, PS4, XBO	Original	FPS		Activision	
October 25	MediEvil	PS4		Action-adventure, Hack and slash		Sony Interactive Entertainment	
October 25	The Outer Worlds	WIN, PS4, XBO		RPG, FPS		Private Division	
October 29	Afterparty	WIN, PS4, XBO		Adventure		Night School Studio	
October 29	Atelier Ryza: Ever Darkness & the Secret Hideout	WIN, NS, PS4		RPG		Koei Tecmo	
October 29	Disgaea 4 Complete+	NS, PS4		Tactical RPG		NIS America	
October 29	Harvest Moon: Mad Dash	NS, PS4		Puzzle		Natsume Inc.	
October 29	Resident Evil 5	NS	Port	Survival horror, TPS		Capcom	
October 29	Resident Evil 6	NS	Port	Survival horror, TPS		Capcom	
October 29	Super Monkey Ball: Banana Blitz HD	NS, PS4, XBO		Platformer		Sega	
October 29	Vampyr	NS		Action RPG		Focus Home Interactive	
October 29	The Wanderer: Frankenstein's Creature	WIN, NS, iOS, DROID, PS4, XBO		Adventure		ARTE France	
October 29	Yakuza 4	PS4		Action-adventure		Sega	
October 31	Ghost Parade	WIN, NS, PS4		Adventure		Aksys Games	
October 31	Luigi's Mansion 3	NS		Action-adventure		Nintendo	
October 31	Song of Horror: Complete Edition	WIN		Survival horror		Raiser Games	
November 1	Spirit of the North	PS4		Adventure		Infuse Studio	
November 5	Just Dance 2020	Wii, NS, PS4, XBO, Stadia		Rhythm		Ubisoft	
November 5	Mario & Sonic at the Olympic Games Tokyo 2020	NS		Sports		Sega	
November 5	Planet Zoo	WIN		CMS		Frontier Developments	
November 5	Red Dead Redemption 2	WIN	Port	Action-adventure	Rockstar Games		
November 5	Valfaris	PS4		Action, Platformer		Merge Games	
November 8	Death Stranding	PS4		Action		Sony Interactive Entertainment	
November 8	Disney Tsum Tsum Festival	NS		Puzzle		Bandai Namco Entertainment	
November 8	Guildlings	iOS, OSX, tvOS		Adventure, RPG		Sirvo Studios	
November 8	Layton's Mystery Journey: Katrielle and the Millionaire's Conspiracy – Deluxe Edition	NS		Puzzle, Adventure		Level-5	
November 8	Need for Speed Heat	WIN, PS4, XBO		Racing		Electronic Arts	
November 8	New Super Lucky's Tale	NS		Platformer		Playful Corp.	
November 8	Valfaris	XBO		Action, Platformer		Merge Games	
November 10	The TakeOver	WIN, OSX		Brawler		Pelikan13	
November 11	Romancing SaGa 3	WIN, NS, PS4, PSV, XBO, iOS, DROID		RPG		Square Enix	
November 11	Tactical Nexus	WIN		Puzzle		Team-Tactical Nexus	
November 13	Last Labyrinth	WIN, PS4		Adventure		AMATA K.K.	
November 14	Age of Empires II: Definitive Edition	WIN		RTS		Xbox Game Studios	
November 14	Terminator: Resistance	WIN, PS4, XBO		FPS		Reef Entertainment	
November 14	War of the Visions: Final Fantasy Brave Exvius (JP)	iOS, DROID		Tactical RPG		Square Enix	
November 15	Golem	PS4		Adventure		Perp Games	
November 15	Pokémon Sword and Shield	NS		RPG		The Pokémon Company, Nintendo	
November 15	Star Wars Jedi: Fallen Order	WIN, PS4, XBO		Action-adventure		Electronic Arts	
November 15	Tokyo Ghoul: re Call to Exist	WIN, PS4		Action, Survival		Bandai Namco Entertainment	
November 19	Assassin's Creed Odyssey	Stadia	Port	Action-adventure		Ubisoft Quebec	
November 19	Attack on Titan 2: Final Battle	Stadia		Hack and slash		Koei Tecmo	
November 19	Destiny 2	Stadia		FPS		Bungie	
November 19	Farming Simulator 19	Stadia		Simulation		Focus Home Interactive	
November 19	Final Fantasy XV	Stadia		Action RPG		Square Enix	
November 19	Football Manager 2020	WIN, iOS, DROID, Stadia		Sports management		Sega	
November 19	Grid	Stadia		Action-adventure		Codemasters	
November 19	Gylt	Stadia		Action-adventure, Puzzle		Tequila Works	
November 19	Just Dance 2020	Stadia		Rhythm		Ubisoft	
November 19	Metro Exodus	Stadia	Port	FPS		4A Games	
November 19	Mortal Kombat 11	Stadia		Fighting		Warner Bros. Interactive Entertainment	
November 19	NBA 2K20	Stadia		Sports		2K Sports	
November 19	Rage 2	Stadia	Port	FPS		Bethesda Softworks	
November 19	Red Dead Redemption 2	Stadia	Port	Action-adventure	Rockstar Games		
November 19	Rise of the Tomb Raider	Stadia	Port	Action-adventure		Square Enix	
November 19	Shadow of the Tomb Raider	Stadia	Port	Action-adventure		Square Enix	
November 19	Shenmue III	WIN, PS4		Action-adventure		Deep Silver	
November 19	Tomb Raider	Stadia	Port	Action-adventure		Square Enix	
November 20	Children of Morta	NS		Action RPG		11 Bit Studios	
November 22	Sniper Ghost Warrior Contracts	WIN, PS4, XBO		FPS		CI Games	
November 27	Cyber Troopers Virtual-On Masterpiece 1995~2001 (JP)	PS4		Action		Sega	
November 27	SD Gundam G Generation Cross Rays	WIN		Tactical RPG		Bandai Namco Entertainment	
November 28	Trover Saves the Universe	NS		Action, Platformer		Squanch Games	
December 3	Blair Witch	PS4		Survival horror		Lionsgate Games	
December 3	Halo: The Master Chief Collection	WIN	Port	FPS		Xbox Game Studios	
December 3	Life Is Strange 2 – Episode 5: Wolves	WIN, PS4, XBO		Graphic adventure		Square Enix	
December 3	Neverwinter Nights: Enhanced Edition	NS, PS4, XBO		RPG		Skybound Games	
December 3	Phoenix Point	WIN, OSX		Strategy, TBT		Snapshot Games	
December 3	SaGa: Scarlet Grace – Ambitions	WIN, NS, PS4, iOS, DROID		RPG		Square Enix	
December 3	Trover Saves the Universe	XBO		Action, Platformer		Squanch Games	
December 5	Alien: Isolation	NS		FPS		Sega	
December 5	Darksiders Genesis	WIN, Stadia		Hack and slash, RPG		THQ Nordic	
December 5	Interrogation	WIN, OSX, LIN		Action-adventure, RPG		Mixtvision	
December 5	Punishing: Gray Raven (CN)	iOS, DROID		Action RPG, Hack and slash		Kuro Games	
December 5	Raging Loop	WIN		Visual novel		PQube	
December 5	Star Ocean: First Departure R	NS, PS4		RPG		Square Enix	
December 6	Ancestors: The Humankind Odyssey	PS4, XBO		Survival	Panache Digital Games	Private Division	
December 10	Boneworks	WIN		FPS		Stress Level Zero	
December 10	Dragon Quest Builders 2	WIN		Action RPG, Sandbox		Square Enix	
December 10	MechWarrior 5: Mercenaries	WIN		Vehicular combat, Action		Piranha Games	
December 10	Shovel Knight: King of Cards	WIN, NS, PS4, XBO		Platformer		Yacht Club Games	
December 10	Shovel Knight: Showdown	WIN, NS, PS4, XBO		Fighting		Yacht Club Games	
December 10	Steins;Gate 0	NS		Visual novel		Spike Chunsoft	
December 10	Steins;Gate: My Darling's Embrace	WIN, NS, PS4		Visual novel		Spike Chunsoft	
December 11	Minecraft Earth	iOS, DROID		AR		Xbox Game Studios	
December 11	Vampire: The Masquerade – Coteries of New York	WIN, OSX, LIN		Adventure		Draw Distance	
December 12	Breath of Fire II	NS		RPG			
December 12	Crystalis	NS		Action RPG			
December 12	Detroit: Become Human	WIN		Adventure		Quantic Dream	
December 12	Famicom Wars (JP)	NS		Strategy, TBT			
December 12	Gensou SkyDrift	WIN, NS		Racing		Unties	
December 12	Journey to Silius	NS		Run and gun			
December 12	Kirby Super Star	NS		Platformer			
December 12	Path of the Warrior	WIN		Brawler		Oculus Studios	
December 12	Route-16 Turbo (JP)	NS		Maze, Racing			
December 12	Sakura Wars (JP)	PS4		Action RPG, Dating sim, Visual novel		Sega	
December 12	Star Fox 2	NS		Shoot 'em up (rail)			
December 12	Super Punch-Out!!	NS		Sports (Boxing)			
December 12	Virgo Versus the Zodiac	OSX, WIN		RPG		Degica Games	
December 13	Balconing Simulator 2020	WIN		Simulation		Humble Publishing	
December 17	Borderlands 3	Stadia		Action RPG, FPS		2K Games	
December 17	Wattam	WIN, PS4		Action		Annapurna Interactive	
December 18	EverQuest: Torment of Velious	WIN		MMO, RPG		Daybreak Games	
December 27	Brain Age: Nintendo Switch Training (JP)	NS		Puzzle		Nintendo	
