= Towa and the Guardians of the Sacred Tree =

- Developer: Brownies Inc.
- Publisher: Bandai Namco Entertainment
- Platforms: Nintendo Switch; PlayStation 5; Windows; Xbox Series X/S
- Release: September 19, 2025
- Genres: Action-adventure, roguelite
- Modes: Single-player, multiplayer

Towa and the Guardians of the Sacred Tree is a roguelite action-adventure game developed by Brownies Inc. and published by Bandai Namco Entertainment. It was released for PlayStation 5, Nintendo Switch, Windows and Xbox Series X and Series S on 19 September 2025. Players move arena-by-arena fighting enemies and if successful are rewarded with buffs that improve players skills or weapon power.

Towa and the Guardians of the Sacred Tree received mixed reviews upon release.

== Gameplay ==
Towa and the Guardians of the Sacred Tree is a 2D isometric roguelite action-adventure game that blends fast-paced combat with a special "sacrifice" mechanic and evolving town management. Players lead a group of warriors known as "Prayer Children" to protect the quiet Shinju Village sacred tree from evil god Magatsu followers. Players select two from roster of the eight available guardians with unique personalities such Rekka – the klutzy master of the Eternal Flame Dojo, Nishiki – devout religious humanoid koi fish that cannot swim and Bampuku – a huge canine-like companion.

== Reception ==
Reception

Aggregate scores
Aggregator	Score
Metacritic	(PS5) 73/100 (NS) 66/100 (PC) 71/100
OpenCritic	54% recommend (Note: Based on 75 reviews)

Review scores
Publication	Score
Destructoid	8/10
Hardcore Gamer	3.5/5
Nintendo World Report	6/10

The PlayStation 5, Nintendo Switch, and PC versions of Towa and the Guardians of the Sacred Tree all received "mixed or average" reviews from critics, according to the review aggregation website Metacritic. Fellow review aggregator OpenCritic assessed that the game received fair approval, being recommended by 54% of critics.
