= Riot: Civil Unrest =

2019 video game

- Logo
- Developers: Leonard Menchiari, Marco Agricola, Fabrizio Zagaglia
- Publishers: Leonard Menchiari, Merge Games
- Director: Leonard Mechiari
- Designers: Leonard Menchiari, Marco Agricola
- Programmers: Marco Agricola, Fabrizio Zagaglia, Jendrik Illner (former)
- Artist: Leonard Menchiari
- Writers: Leonard Menchiari, Noemi De Cicco, Leonardo Bianchi, José Antonio Sánchez Parrón, Mostafa Hovsam
- Composer: Giacomo Langella
- Engine: Unity
- Platforms: Linux; macOS; Windows; Nintendo Switch; PlayStation 4; Xbox One; iOS
- Release: February 12, 2019
- Genre: Real-time strategy
- Modes: Single-player, multiplayer

Riot: Civil Unrest (stylized as RIOT: Civil Unrest) is a 2019 real time strategy video game that simulates riots based on real events. The project started with a successful Indiegogo campaign in February 2014 and entered early access in December 2017. The director of the game and previously an editor and cinematographer at Valve, Leonard Menchiari, has experienced riots personally and the game was created as a way to express it and to tell the stories of these events. The player can pick between playing as police or rioters. It supports Linux, macOS, Windows, Nintendo Switch, PlayStation 4, Xbox One, and iOS.

== Gameplay ==
Gameplay screenshot.

The game allows the player to play as both the police and rioting groups. As the police, the game revolves around strategy and planning, with a GUI that adopts a traditional police style. This contrasts the typical gameplay of the rioting group, which is adaptive and responsive, relying on the decisions the police make as opposed to long-term planning, instead relying on fast decision-making skills. The game includes six main campaigns set in Italy, Greece, Spain and Egypt.

Other riots set across the world will be available as well as an unlockable. Each scenario will have different backgrounds as well as props and police uniforms. activists' clothing will be procedurally generated. Characters will have different stats that change the way they react in different situations, This means people will act in unpredictable ways based on the elements that will happen in each riot. There is a plan to release an in-game level editor in which players will be able to re-create the riots that are currently going on in the world. The levels can then be shared with anyone in the world, and can then be rated by others based on quality and historical accuracy.

== Development ==
The game's scenarios were partly informed through designer Leonard Menchiari's participation in the Italian No TAV protests. It was part funded through an Indiegogo crowdfunding campaign, raising $36,139 in March 2013. Some of the game's budget was for travel and research. It aims to depict scenarios in a neutral manner, allowing the player to explore both sides of the conflict.

The game emulates a 2D retro look even though the scene is 3D, which gives more realistic lighting, physics, and visual effects. All character movements are physics based. This means that rather than following just a path, the crowd movement will be influenced by the physical contact given by the rest of the crowd. The art style is inspired by Superbrothers: Sword & Sworcery EP.

In 2019, Leonard Menchiari released the iOS version for free. An Android version was cancelled.

== Reception ==
On Metacritic, the Windows version received mixed reviews, and the Switch and PlayStation 4 versions received negative reviews. Eurogamer and Rock Paper Shotgun reviewed the early release version. Eurogamer felt that its timeliness made it "deeply unnerving" and difficult to enjoy as entertainment. Although they praised the art, Rock Paper Shotgun disliked the strategy elements and thought it had too little to say about riots. Nintendo Life criticized the released Switch version for not taking advantage of its controls, and they said it lacked any insight into riots.

== See also ==
- The Eternal Castle
