= Retro City Rampage =

2012 action-adventure video game

- Developer: Vblank Entertainment
- Publisher: Vblank Entertainment
- Designer: Brian Provinciano
- Composers: Leonard J. Paul; Jake Kaufman; Matthew Creamer
- Platforms: Windows, PlayStation 3, PlayStation Vita, Xbox 360, Wii, Nintendo 3DS, Switch, OS X, PlayStation 4, Linux, MS-DOS, PlayStation Portable, iOS, Android
- Release: October 9, 2012: Windows; October 9, 2012; PlayStation 3, PS Vita; NA: October 9, 2012; PAL: January 16, 2013; Xbox 360; January 2, 2013; Wii; February 28, 2013; Nintendo 3DS; February 6, 2014; OS X; November 11, 2014; PlayStation 4; NA: November 11, 2014; PAL: November 12, 2014; Linux, MS-DOS; July 29, 2015; PlayStation Portable; NA: July 19, 2016; PAL: July 27, 2016; iOS; March 10, 2016; Android; December 13, 2016; Switch; August 3, 2017
- Genre: Action-adventure
- Mode: Single-player

Retro City Rampage is an action-adventure game developed by Vblank Entertainment. It is a parody of retro games and 1980s and 1990s pop culture, as well as Grand Theft Auto and similar games. It was first released for PlayStation 3, PlayStation Vita and Microsoft Windows in 2012, with ports later releasing for several other platforms.

An enhanced version, Retro City Rampage DX, was released for Nintendo 3DS in 2014, followed by later ports for other platforms. Previous ports of the original version were later updated to the DX version via free updates. An MS-DOS version, Retro City Rampage 486, was released on July 29, 2015, as a limited physical run on a floppy disk as well as a free digital download for owners of the modern computer version of the game.

A sequel, Shakedown: Hawaii, was released in 2019.

== Gameplay ==
The game is inspired by Rockstar Games' Grand Theft Auto games, in that the player can complete a variety of missions within an enormous city that is open to explore. During development, around 50 story missions and 30 challenge levels were planned. Gameplay elements shared with GTA include the vast assortment of weaponry, the miscellaneous shops, the ability to hijack vehicles, and the ability to attract police attention with violence and destruction.

As a homage to numerous 8-bit video games, Retro City Rampage incorporates design elements from many different genres, and features 16 graphical filters that simulate various retro computers and game consoles. Although it is primarily played from a top-down bird's-eye viewpoint, in specific sections, it may switch to a strictly two-dimensional perspective in the style of a 2D platformer.

The game also includes a "Free Roaming Mode" that allows players to freely explore the city and cause as much chaos as they can. This mode can also be played with unlockable characters from other indie developed games: like Super Meat Boy, Commander Video from the Bit.Trip series, and Steve from Minecraft, among others.

On February 28, the same day as the Wii release, an update for PC became available, allowing users to access a version of the game's prototype, called ROM City Rampage. ROM City Rampage is a port of Retro City Rampage to NES homebrew and emulated within Retro City Rampage. PC users received the update for free, and it was included with the Wii and 3DS versions. The update was later released on PSN and Xbox Live.

== Plot ==
In the city of Theftropolis in 1985, "The Player", a thug for hire, is hired as a henchman of a major crime syndicate led by the Jester. Three years later, during a bank heist gone wrong, The Player runs into a time-traveling telephone booth, which he then steals from its owners. The booth flings him forward an indeterminate amount of time to the year 20XX. Upon arrival, the booth breaks down and a man named Doc Choc (a parody of Dr. Emmett Brown from the Back to the Future films) arrives in his own time-traveling vehicle and rescues the Player, mistakenly believing him to be a time-traveling hero.

The Player must work with Doc Choc to gather the rare parts needed to repair the time booth, whilst encountering numerous 1980s videogame and pop culture references and parodies, including law enforcement, the Jester, Bayside High School students, and Dr. Von Buttnik (a parody of Sonic the Hedgehog's arch enemy Dr. Robotnik), Doc Choc's rival and head of R&D at A.T. Corp, a tech corporation that desires to use the time machine to control the electronics market.

== Development ==
The concept for Retro City Rampage originally came from a homebrew project that began in 2002. In his spare time, game programmer Brian Provinciano constructed his own Nintendo Entertainment System development kit and set about remaking one of his favourite titles, Grand Theft Auto III, with 8-bit sprite graphics, under the codename of Grand Theftendo. At the 2011 Game Developers Conference, he revealed his methods, showing how, over several years, he built advanced software tools to help him overcome the limitations of Nintendo Entertainment System hardware, before eventually shifting development to the PC.

At one point in the process, he started to add characters and locations from other games he enjoyed from his childhood. This ultimately inspired him to work on the project full-time, but instead of using scenarios from GTA III, he decided to create an entirely new game with original content in 2007, which would be released as a downloadable title for consoles. He used a real-time map editor to adjust and debug on the fly, and also integrated several suggestions from playtesters.

For most of the project, he had worked completely independently on the design, coding and art. Later in development, he hired a pixel artist to assist with the visual design of the game and went through revisions. He also brought in three renowned videogame composers, Leonard "FreakyDNA" Paul, Jake "Virt" Kaufman and Matt "Norrin Radd" Creamer, to create chiptune songs for the game's soundtrack. Provinciano stated that the game contains roughly two and a half hours of chiptune music. On February 22, 2012, the Retro City Rampage soundtrack was released on Bandcamp.

The game pays tribute to many titles through its title, storytelling, levels, and character abilities, such as River City Ransom, Super Mario Bros., The Legend of Zelda, Duck Hunt, Mega Man, Contra, Bionic Commando, Metal Gear, Smash TV, and Teenage Mutant Ninja Turtles, among others. The game also pays tribute to "cheesy" one-liners, television shows and pop culture, as well as cameos including Phil Fish (creator of Fez), Billy Campbell, and Phil Guerrero (of YTV fame) with permission.

Despite the game's title sounding similar to River City Ransom, Vblank Entertainment's Retro City Rampage Twitter account has stated that the title is, in fact, not a reference to River City Ransom.

The game has received several updates since the original release polishing the game and adding features.

On July 2, 2020, days after announcing a Europe-exclusive, limited edition Wii port of Retro City Rampage's sequel, Shakedown: Hawaii, Vblank Entertainment announced that a physical Wii version of Retro City Rampage, titled Retro City Rampage DX+ would also be simultaneously released with it in the same region on July 9, 2020, with a limited print run of 3,000 copies. It was released in Europe only due to Nintendo of America no longer having the necessary departments open to be able to produce physical Wii games. This special, limited edition release also features more polished animation and visuals. This release also gives both Retro City Rampage and Shakedown: Hawaii the accolade of being the final Wii games ever released for the console.

Around the time these limited edition Wii physical releases were made available, Provinciano revealed that he is also working on trying to port Rampage to the Game Boy Advance, a challenging project he spent years on.

== Reception ==
Reception

Aggregate scores
Aggregator	Score
GameRankings	(3DS) 85% (PSV) 77% (Wii) 76% (PS3) 75% (PC) 73% (X360) 72%
Metacritic	(NS) 91/100 (IOS) 84/100 (3DS) 83/100 (PSV) 79/100 (PS3) 71/100 (PC) 71/100 (X360) 71/100
OpenCritic	91% recommend

Review scores
Publication	Score
Eurogamer	8/10
Game Informer	7/10
GameSpot	7/10
GamesRadar+	3/5
GameTrailers	7.7/10
IGN	5.3/10
Joystiq	4/5

Retro City Rampage received mostly positive reviews. It holds a metascore of 71 on Metacritic.

As of March 2013, the game had sold around 100,000 copies. PS3 and PC versions made the most profit, Xbox 360 version the third most, and Wii came last with about 2,500 units sold.

As of December 2014, the developer announced the game had reached 400,000 sold copies (and an additional 270,000 PS+ units) while also revealing that the PC and the PlayStation family versions were the most successful.

== Sequel ==
On November 24, 2015, Shakedown: Hawaii, a sequel to Retro City Rampage, was announced. Set 30 years after the major events in Retro City Rampage, the game features an open world, destructible environments and 16-bit visuals. The game is set to be released for Microsoft Windows, PlayStation 4, PlayStation Vita, Nintendo 3DS, and Nintendo Switch. The game was released on May 7, 2019, for all platforms, with a Nintendo 3DS version released on September 19, 2019, in North America, in Europe and Australia on September 26, 2019. In June 2020, it was revealed that Shakedown: Hawaii was releasing on the Wii on July 9, 2020, exclusively in Europe, making it (and Retro City Rampage DX) the final Wii games to be officially released. There is also a port for Wii U that came out exclusively in North America in August 2020, along with a release on Steam.
