= Brownies (company) =

Video game developer

Brownies Inc.
- Native name: 株式会社ブラウニーズ
- Romanized name: Kabushiki gaisha Buraunīzu
- Company type: Kabushiki gaisha
- Industry: Video games
- Founded: November 15, 2012; 13 years ago in Tokyo, Japan
- Founder: Kameoka Shinichi; Kouji Tsuda
- Headquarters: Kichijōji, Medi Corp Building 8 701, 180-0004, Musashino, Tokyo, Japan
- Website: brownie-games.co.jp

Brownies Inc. (Note: Japanese: 株式会社ブラウニーズ, Hepburn: Kabushiki gaisha Buraunīzu) is a Japanese video game developer based in Tokyo. It was founded in 2012 by Shinichi Kameoka, who is best known for his work on the Mana series. He founded the company after leaving his previous studio, Brownie Brown, which had been restructured to become a development support studio for Nintendo and became 1-Up Studio the same day. Kameoka cited more freedom to create original works as his reason for starting Brownies. Kouji Tsuda, a co-founder and former artist at Brownie Brown, also joined the new company.

== Games developed ==
Year	Title	Platform(s)	Publisher
2013	Fantasy Life Link!	Nintendo 3DS	Level-5
2013	Shooting Hero	Android, iOS	GMO
2016	Seventh Rebirth	Android, iOS	GungHo Online Entertainment
2017	Egglia: Legend of the Redcap	Android, iOS	Brownies
2018	Egglia: The Last Egg	Android, iOS	Brownies
2019	Doraemon Story of Seasons (Note: Co-developed with Marvelous.)	Nintendo Switch, PlayStation 4, Microsoft Windows	Bandai Namco Entertainment
2021	Egglia Rebirth	Nintendo Switch	Brownies
2025	Towa and the Guardians of the Sacred Tree	Nintendo Switch, PlayStation 5, Xbox Series X/S, Microsoft Windows	Bandai Namco Entertainment
