= Children of Morta =

2019 role-playing video game

- Developer: Dead Mage
- Publisher: 11 Bit Studios
- Platforms: Linux; macOS; Microsoft Windows; PlayStation 4; Xbox One; Nintendo Switch; Android; IOS
- Release: Microsoft Windows; September 3, 2019; PlayStation 4, Xbox One; October 15, 2019; Nintendo Switch; November 20, 2019; Android, IOS; October 7, 2024
- Genres: Action role-playing, roguelike
- Modes: Single-player, multiplayer

Children of Morta (Persian: فرزندان مورتا) is an action role-playing video game with roguelike elements, released in September 2019. Developed by studio Dead Mage, it follows the story of the Bergson family, custodians of Mount Morta, who must defend it from an evil called the Corruption.

== Gameplay ==
Players take on the role of members of the Bergson family, with additional family members being unlocked as a player progresses through the game, to a total of seven playable characters. Each family member has its own playstyle and gameplay mechanics and levels up as it is played, granting improvements to themselves and other family members. The player must traverse a number of procedurally generated dungeons within the caverns of Mount Morta to clear them of various enemies and bosses.

Individual runs of the dungeon are bookended with returns to the Bergson family home, which sometimes progresses the narrative or allows players to witness additional dialogue. Some parts of the story take place after events happening in the game.

== Reception ==
Reception

Aggregate score
Aggregator	Score
Metacritic	PC: 82/100; PS4: 80/100; XONE: 80/100; NS: 80/100

Review scores
Publication	Score
Famitsu	33/40 (9, 8, 8, 8)
GameSpot	80/100
Hardcore Gamer	4.5/5
PC Gamer (US)	68/100

Children of Morta was met with "generally favorable" reviews on all platforms, according to the review aggregator Metacritic.

At the 2025 Pégases Awards, Children of Morta was nominated for Best Foreign Mobile Game.
