= Shakedown: Hawaii =

2019 open world action-adventure video game

- Developer: Vblank Entertainment
- Publisher: Vblank Entertainment
- Designer: Brian Provinciano
- Composer: Matthew Creamer
- Platforms: Nintendo Switch; PlayStation 4; PlayStation Vita; Windows; Nintendo 3DS; Wii; Wii U; PlayStation 3; PlayStation 5; iOS
- Release: Nintendo Switch, PlayStation 4, PlayStation Vita, Windows: WW: May 7, 2019; Nintendo 3DS: NA: September 19, 2019 (Digital), November 6, 2023 (Physical); PAL: September 26, 2019; Wii: EU: July 9, 2020; Wii U: NA: August 20, 2020; PlayStation 3: WW: August 20, 2020; PlayStation 5: WW: December 15, 2020; iOS: WW: December 20, 2024
- Genre: Action-adventure
- Mode: Single-player

Shakedown: Hawaii is a 2019 open world action-adventure video game developed by Canadian studio Vblank Entertainment. Like its predecessor Retro City Rampage, it is a parody of multiple subjects, including retro games, 1980s pop culture, manipulative business practices, and Grand Theft Auto and similar games. It was originally released on Nintendo Switch, PlayStation 4, PlayStation Vita and Windows, followed by a Nintendo 3DS port. In 2020, it was ported both to a number of legacy consoles, including Wii, Wii U and PlayStation 3, both digitally and physically; Shakedown: Hawaii was the last official game release for those platforms. In addition, a physical version of the 3DS port was released later in November 2023.

== Story ==
Gameplay screenshot

Decades after founding Hawaii-based conglomerate Feeble Multinational and writing a best-selling business advice book, the aging and out-of-touch CEO of Feeble learns that his company is on the verge of bankruptcy, with online shopping, video streaming, and vehicle for hire mobile apps sapping Feeble's profits from its retail stores, VHS rentals, and taxi services. The CEO, together with his unemployed adult son Scooter and a henchman known only as "The Consultant", band together to rebuild Feeble into a corporate empire. Their arsenal of unscrupulous tactics includes violating consumer protection standards, razing buildings to make way for redevelopment, competing on a dangerous game show, destroying package delivery trucks, raiding a drug cartel, and shaking down other businesses. A subplot centers around the CEO's son Scooter as he joins a gang and performs tasks for the gang's leader, Tad.

== Gameplay ==
Shakedown: Hawaii features an open world island with 16-bit style graphics, a top-down perspective, over 200 accessible buildings, and a destructible environment. In addition to a story mode following the three main characters, the player can break away from missions to free-roam the map and extort local businesses, use a variety of weapons to cause chaos, attempt arcade-like challenges and mini-games, purchase real-estate in a market that fluctuates in response, steal cars, or purchase clothing from stores. Combat is similar to Retro City Rampage, and involves using a wide variety of weapons to destroy enemies, vehicles, and property.

== Release ==
Shakedown: Hawaii was released for Microsoft Windows, Nintendo Switch, PlayStation 4, and PlayStation Vita on May 7, 2019, and also for the Nintendo 3DS on September 19, 2019 in North America, and September 26, 2019 in Europe and Australia. A port for the PlayStation 5 was released on December 15, 2020.

Many months after its initial release, VBlank ported Shakedown to three consoles that were discontinued in recent years: the Wii, the Wii U and the PlayStation 3. VBlank announced the Wii and Wii U versions on June 26, 2020. Both versions included all major content updates released to that point, and allowed the player to play the game with a sideways Wii Remote or a Classic Controller, with the former also supporting the GameCube controller and the latter supporting native Wii U controllers. The Wii version was released on July 9 exclusively in Europe with only a limited run of 3,000 copies, due to the system's obsolescence and Nintendo of America's inability to authorize a North American release. According to Vice, designer Brian Provinciano was informed that Nintendo of America was unable to approve a release because a few of its departments no longer had the ability to retrieve equipment that is necessary to distribute the game physically in North America. The Wii U version released worldwide the following month, with a physical release for NTSC systems. The Wii U version released on August 20, 2020 in three different editions: a digital download format that was available on the Wii U's Nintendo eShop, and two physical editions (one standard edition and one special edition, with the latter featuring a digital soundtrack and a special protective case) that were each limited to 3,000 copies, like the Wii version. This was the final game to be released physically on the Wii in Europe, the final game to be released physically on the Wii U in North America. Vblank also announced that a PlayStation 3 version of Shakedown: Hawaii would be digitally released on the same day, featuring the same post-release content added to the Wii and Wii U versions. Players who owned Shakedown: Hawaii on any other PlayStation platform are able to download the PS3 version for free, as well as synchronize save progress between that version and other owned PlayStation versions of the game. A physical version was announced in September 2022.

Shakedown: Hawaii was released on iOS mobile devices on December 20, 2024.

== Reception ==
Reception

Aggregate score
Aggregator	Score
Metacritic	(NS) 75% (PC) 71% (PS4) 78%

Review scores
Publication	Score
Destructoid	8/10
Game Informer	8/10
GameRevolution	4/5
Nintendo Life	6/10
Nintendo World Report	6.5/10

Shakedown: Hawaii has received reviews ranging from "generally favorable" to "mixed or average" depending on platform according to Metacritic.

Destructoid scored the game an 8/10. Reviewer Chris Carter praised the gameplay, visuals, soundtrack, and "relaxed emphasis on doing whatever you want", calling the game a worthy follow-up to Retro City Rampage that improved on many of its aspects. However, Carter noted there were some minor mission-interrupting glitches, and criticized the story's presentation: "I don't think the tritagonist focus (you play as the CEO's son and the company's main Winston Wolf fixer) really serves the narrative, nor does it make a meaningful statement against, say, GTA V's usage of the same conceit. [...] I mostly just found myself playing as the CEO as he is the crux of the tale."

Game Informer's Jeff Cork also gave the game an 8/10, highlighting the abundance of content and humorous tone, but describing the economy as unbalanced because it was possible to earn enough money to trivialize the acquisition of late-game purchases. In his summation, Cork stated, "The economy might be a little wonky, but Shakedown: Hawaii delivers a nice blast of classic arcade action and some solid laughs."
