= Doraemon Story of Seasons =

2019 video game

- Developers: Brownies; Marvelous
- Publisher: Bandai Namco Entertainment: JP: Marvelous
- Director: Hikaru Kano
- Series: Doraemon; Story of Seasons
- Engine: Unity
- Platforms: Nintendo Switch; Windows; PlayStation 4
- Release: Nintendo Switch, Windows: JP: June 13, 2019; WW: October 11, 2019; PlayStation 4: JP: July 30, 2020; WW: September 4, 2020
- Genres: Farming sim, Role-playing
- Mode: Single-player

Doraemon Story of Seasons (Note: Doraemon Nobita no Bokujō Monogatari (ドラえもん のび太の牧場物語)) is a 2019 farming sim role-playing video game developed by Brownies and Marvelous and published by Bandai Namco Entertainment for Nintendo Switch and Windows. It is a crossover of the Story of Seasons video game series and the Doraemon franchise. The title's release marks the first release of a Doraemon video game to international audiences.

The game was released in Japan on June 13, 2019, and worldwide on October 11, 2019. The PlayStation 4 version of the game was released on July 30, 2020 in Japan, and worldwide on September 4, 2020. A sequel, Doraemon Story of Seasons: Friends of the Great Kingdom (Note: Japanese: ドラえもん のび太の牧場物語2 大自然の王国とみんなの家, Hepburn: Doraemon Nobita no Bokujō Monogatari 2: Dai Shizen no Ōkoku to Minna no Ie), was released worldwide for Nintendo Switch, PlayStation 5, and Windows on November 2, 2022.

== Gameplay ==
Doraemon Story of Seasons combines the farming simulation elements from the Story of Seasons series and the familiar characters and secret gadgets from the Doraemon series. The person will play as Nobita and participate in farming activities such as plowing the fields to grow crops, taking care of cattle and sheep, and more. The game also has a fishing system, a house decoration system, an insects capture-and-collect system, holidays and festivals similar to the Story of Seasons games.

Characters from the Doraemon series such as Gian, Suneo and Shizuka (who were part of the main cast) also show up as supporting characters and assist Nobita in his adventures. By advancing the story, Nobita can unlock gadgets that grant special abilities such as Weather Cards which can change tomorrow's weather and the Anywhere Door which allows Nobita to fast-travel between areas.

== Plot ==
After finding a mysterious seed, Nobita, Doraemon, and their friends plant it in an empty area outside of town. It grows into a giant tree that creates a storm that transports them to another world located in the past, into the fictional town of Natura. Many of Doraemon's gadgets are lost in the process. In the end, they decided to stay in Natura while trying to find a way to get back to the present time. One of its residents, Harmon, lends Nobita a farm in town for him to stay while his friends take jobs around town. Nobita and his friends soon meet a goddess named Vera. She agrees to help them return home in exchange for four things which are related to four of Doraemon's gadgets: the Come-Here Cat, the Time TV, the Realization Pen, and the Sprite Summoner. Despite completing the task, she is still unable to help them. Having been suspicious of her motives earlier, Vera tells them the truth: she is not a goddess but a scientist who came from the far future (presumably Doraemon's time, which explains how she knew about Doraemon's gadgets) who was stranded in the past after her time machine broke. During her time in Natura, she married a man and had a son. The Elder Tree, a giant tree that is growing near Natura, is actually a giant mechanical plant that she used to purify the town's soil, which is why people believed that she is a goddess. The storm from before is revealed to have been caused by the Elder Tree as a result of a malfunction that caused it to displace people and objects through time, which separated Vera from her family and that she had hoped to use Doraemon's gadgets to reunite with them.

Doraemon and friends eventually succeed in permanently stopping the time-displacing storm, causing the Elder Tree to disappear. Vera reveals that Harmon is actually her son and his grandmother Ravi reveals that she is actually his aunt, also revealing that her brother, who was lost in the storm, is Vera's husband, making her and Vera sister-in-laws. Nobita remembers Vera's time machine, and they decide to have Doraemon help her fix it. Once that is done, they return to the present, but also leave the time machine with Vera so she can find her husband, also promising to come back and visit soon.

== Development ==
In an interview with Famitsu, it is revealed that Doraemon Story of Seasons was a proposal from Bandai Namco producer Kenji Nakajima to Marvelous, as he is a fan of Marvelous’ Story of Seasons series. He grew up while watching Doraemon, and he is also a fan of the Harvest Moon: Back to Nature game. He wants to create a game that lets players experience the messages and type of story Doraemon tells, with the gameplay elements of Story of Seasons that properly reward the player's efforts.

Nakajima also confirmed that the game will not have any romance or marriage features, which is different from the classic Story of Seasons series. In exchange for this, the game features a linear story with a focus on familial love..

== Release ==
The game was first announced during a Nintendo Direct presentation on February 14, 2019 in Japan accompanied by a teaser trailer featuring basic gameplay. Bandai Namco announced the official release date of June 13, 2019 though a press release in April. A downloadable demo for Nintendo Switch was later released in Japan in May along with a new trailer.

In a separate announcement in April, Bandai Namco Entertainment Asia and Korea announced a Traditional Chinese and Korean version of the game, which will be released in Summer 2019. They also announced a Windows version of the game, which will be released through Steam. A follow-up announcement by Bandai Namco also confirmed the release of an English version of the game in North America, Europe and Southeast Asia. The game will be released physically in Europe and Southeast Asia, and digital-only in North America.

In April 2020, it was announced that the game would be released for PlayStation 4 in Japan on July 30, 2020, and worldwide on September 4, 2020. Unlike with the Switch version, the PlayStation 4 version runs at 60 FPS instead of 30. It is backwards compatible on the PlayStation 5, benefiting from the console's upgraded hardware to deliver improved load times and faster performance.

In August 2022, it was announced that the sequel would launch in Japan for Nintendo Switch, PlayStation 5, and Windows on November 2, 2022.

== Reception ==
Reception

Aggregate score
| Aggregator | Score |
|---|---|
| Metacritic | (PS4) 68/100 (NS) 75/100 |

Review scores
| Publication | Score |
|---|---|
| Hardcore Gamer | 4/5 |
| IGN | 5.5/10 |
| Nintendo Life | 7/10 |
| Nintendo World Report | 8.5/10 |
| RPGFan | 78/100 |

Doraemon Story of Seasons received "mixed or average" reviews for PlayStation 4 and "generally favorable" reviews for the Switch.

IGN heavily criticized the game for feeling like work, describing its gameplay as tedious and antiquated and its dialogue as "...time-consuming, meandering, and weird", while praising the game's world for looking "like a page ripped from a child's storybook". Nintendo Life praised the game's simplicity and repetitiveness for being rewarding and described its art style as "gorgeous" while criticizing its slow pace and reliance on grinding in order to progress. Nintendo World Report praised the gameplay and its accessibility while criticizing choppiness present in the graphics and the overwhelming amount of text in the game.
