= Vane (video game) =

- Developers: Friend & Foe
- Publishers: Sony Interactive Entertainment (PS4), Gamera Game (Windows)
- Producer: Matt Smith
- Platforms: PlayStation 4, Windows
- Release: PlayStation 4; January 15, 2019; Windows; June 22, 2019
- Genre: Adventure game
- Mode: Single-player video game

Vane is a video game released on January 15, 2019, for the PlayStation 4 and later released on Windows. The game was developed by Tokyo-based studio Friend & Foe, and its producer is Matt Smith.

Vane is an adventure game in which players control a child that is able to turn back and forth into a bird. Gameplay involves exploration and puzzle-solving. The game received mixed reviews upon release.

== Reception ==
Reception

Aggregate score
Aggregator	Score
Metacritic	(PS4) 49/100 (PC) 63/100

Review scores
Publication	Score
Adventure Gamers	2/5
Destructoid	4/10
Eurogamer	Recommended
Game Informer	6.75/10
GameSpot	5/10
Hardcore Gamer	1.5/5
Push Square	4/10
Shacknews	3/10

Vane received "mixed or average" reviews for PC and "generally unfavorable" reviews for PlayStation 4.

Chris Moyse of Destructoid gave the game 4 out of 10, stating, "Vane has a very strong opening, some unique visual ideas, and an atmospheric electronica soundtrack. Unfortunately, all of this is quickly muted by aimless and frustrating gameplay. Though Vane‘s abstract approach to storytelling is genuinely liberating, the player remains caged with simplistic gameplay tropes, immersion-breaking technical problems, boring puzzles, and a terrible save system." Adventure Gamers gave the game 2 stars out of 5 and praised the sound design and the bird's-eye view of the world while criticizing its clunky controls, lack of objectives, incomprehensible narrative, and obfuscated mechanics. Hardcore Gamer gave the game a 1.5 out of 5 and said that despite the vacancy of explanation and the abundant technical issues, what made Vane a truly bad game was that it was "an utter chore to play through". GameSpot lauded the visual style, soundtrack, and changing environments while lambasting the presence of severe glitches, vague presentation of themes, and technical issues with the camera. Push Square negatively reviewed the game, giving it 4 stars out of 10, writing, "Vane is exhausting, ponderous, bewildering, endlessly frustrating, needlessly obtuse, narratively unsatisfying, mechanically clumsy, and technically shoddy, all shot through a camera so ill-equipped to deal with the rudimentary task of showing you what's happening on screen that you might as well pop a blindfold on and try using The Force". Shacknews similarly gave the game 3 out of 10, lauding the visuals and synthwave soundtrack while taking serious issue with tedious gameplay mechanics, loads of glitches, clunky controls, bland puzzles, lack of a save system, lack of interesting content, and lack of direction.

Game Informer reviewed the game slightly more positively, giving it a 6.75 out of 10, writing, "Vane feels like an indescribable fever dream when it works, relaying a wordless story about a transforming creature trying to figure out its place in a world that appears to be falling apart. Too often though bugs and a lack of clear direction reminded me that Vane could have used a little bit of extra development time for polish." Edwin Evans-Thirlwell of Eurogamer wrote positively, recommending the game, stating, "...this isn't an experience for those who prefer a steady pulse of gratification...it wants you to take your time...Settle into those rhythms, and forgive Vane its rickety moments, and you may be astonished by where it takes you".

=== Accolades ===
The game was nominated for "Game, Original Family" at the NAVGTR Awards.
