= Tokyo Chronos =

- Developer: MyDearest
- Publisher: MyDearest
- Series: Chronos
- Platforms: Windows, PlayStation 4
- Release: JP: March 20, 2019; PlayStation 4: JP: August 22, 2019
- Genre: Visual novel

Tokyo Chronos (Note: Japanese: 東京クロノス, Hepburn: Tokyo Kuronosu) is a 2019 visual novel. The game is set in a deserted version of the Shibuya area of Tokyo, where a group of eight close friends, including the player, explore. As the story progresses, the mysteries of the world and the secrets each character harbours are revealed.

The game was made by MyDearest and was one of the earliest visual novel games designed for virtual reality headsets. The game was crowdfunded online and reached its goal by the second day of funding.

== Gameplay ==
Tokyo Chronos is a visual novel. The game is played with a virtual reality (VR) headset. The direction the players face while wearing the headset influences the story that unfolds in the game. Motion controllers are not used, and the game has traditional visual novel controls where the player presses buttons to move the text forward in the game.

As you advance the text with the controller, the situation and dialogue change, and the scenes and music shift accordingly. At times, you're presented with choices, and the story branches depending on your selections. Once the player has found all the endings, a new special "final" ending is unlocked.

== Development ==
Tokyo Chronos was developed by MyDearest, a company founded in 2016. The game's script was written by novelist Kou Segawa who was chosen due to his interest in Virtual Reality (VR). It was one of the first visual novels made for a virtual reality headset. While originally thinking the game would be a two-to-three-hour project, the amount of material he had to write was extended to the length of three to four novels. To raise money for the project a crowdfunding campaign was made on Campfire, a Japanese crowdfunding website. It reached its goal of 2.5 million yen in 17 hours. In total, it raised over 8 million Japanese yen in crowdfunding.

The team intentionally included text to immerse players in the story's world, which was traditionally used in Japanese adventure games. The team found that reading text for extended periods in VR made them pay particular attention to the fonts, the parallax, and made the click sound when displaying the next character to be appropriately satisfying. They chose certain colours to be corresponding characters to make it easier to know who is talking. To also help with development, characters move by warping around instead of physically moving in the game.

It was made to be compatible with Oculus Go, Oculus Rift, HTC Vive and PlayStation VR. An event was held on March 18 in Shibuya, which featured appearances by the development team and voice actors. Tokyo Chronos was released on March 20, 2019, for various VR headsets. Tokyo Chronos was the highest in the worldwide sales charts for Steam in the VR category worldwide. It was distributed by MyDearest on August 22, 2019, for the PlayStation 4.

== Reception ==
Reception

Review score
Publication	Score
IGN	8.6/10

Reviewing the game for CNET, Taisho Saito praised Tokyo Chronos's engaging story and the game's adaptation of the visual novel format into VR. While Hiroaki Mabuchi of IGN said the story started strong and had some unexpected shifts in direction, it ultimately felt too linear, which felt against the experience that VR provides. While finding the text effects for the characters in the game to be highly polished for VR, he felt that some objects scaled a little too large when viewing them through the headset at different ranges.

In September 2019, a sequel titled Altdeus: Beyond Chronos was announced at the Tokyo Game Show. Unlike the original game, which was a hybrid of a mystery and a coming-of-age story set in Shibuya, the sequel had a science fiction setting and is set in the year 2280.
