= Valfaris =

2019 video game

- Developer: Steel Mantis
- Publisher: Big Sugar
- Director: Andrew Gilmour
- Designer: Thomas Jenns
- Programmer: Thomas Jenns
- Artist: Andrew Gilmour
- Composer: Curt Victor Bryant
- Platforms: Microsoft Windows; Nintendo Switch; Xbox One; PlayStation 4; Amazon Luna
- Release: Windows, Switch; October 10, 2019; PlayStation 4; November 5, 2019; Xbox One; November 8, 2019; Amazon Luna; December 3, 2020
- Genres: Action, platform
- Mode: Single-player

Valfaris is a 2D action platforming game developed by Steel Mantis and published by Big Sugar. The game was released for Windows and Nintendo Switch on October 10, 2019, and later for PlayStation 4 and Xbox One in November. Merge Games distributed the physical copies of the PlayStation 4 and Nintendo Switch versions in November 2019. Amazon Luna version arrived in December 2020. The game's soundtrack was composed by former Celtic Frost guitarist Curt Victor Bryant.

The game follows Therion, a warrior who returns to his home of Valfaris and finds out that it has devolved into chaos. He goes on a journey to figure out what happened to his home, destroy its demonic inhabitants, and kill his dad in the process.

Valfaris received generally favorable reviews from critics. A sequel, titled Valfaris: Mecha Therion, was released on November 21, 2023 for PC and consoles.

== Gameplay ==
Therion shoots at an enemy.

In Valfaris, the player controls Therion, who is armed with a sword and a plasma pistol. The pistol can be fired in eight directions. Therion also has access to a heavy gun and a shield. Therion's energy meter is depleted when he uses the shield or the heavy gun. The energy meter is replenished when Therion kills an enemy or loots a supply cache. Therion can use the shield to block incoming fire, but he cannot move while using it. If the shield is used at the correct time, it can send projectiles back towards enemies. Blood metal is used to upgrade Therion's weapons, making guns fire faster and giving swords longer reach. Weapons have to be upgraded at shrines. These shrines are also used as checkpoints. To activate these checkpoints, a green token called a Resurrection Idol must be used. A Resurrection Idol can be found stashed in levels. Saving Resurrection Idols up until a certain threshold rewards the player with higher health and energy. Resurrection Idols are not lost if Therion dies.

== Development and release ==
Valfaris was developed by Steel Mantis, an independent studio that previously developed Slain: Back from Hell. The game was first revealed through a trailer released during E3 2017 and was originally scheduled for release in 2018 for PlayStation 4, Xbox One, and PC. In 2018, a 30-minute gameplay trailer was released, showing off the game's weapons, saving system, and weapon upgrades. Valfaris was featured as part of the Indie Megabooth at PAX West 2018, and a game demo of Valfaris was shown at Gamescom. A Nintendo Switch version of the game was also confirmed by video game publisher Digerati. Valfaris was featured at EGX 2018.

Another demo of Valfaris was featured at the 2019 Game Developers Conference. A trailer was shown off at the PC Gaming Show during E3 2019. Steel Mantis also presented a model of the Bringer of Mayhem, one of the weapons in the game. Merge Games distributed the physical copies of PlayStation 4 and Switch versions, starting in November 2019. The game comes as a standard edition and a special edition titled Valfaris: Digital Deluxe Edition. The signature edition came with digitally signed artwork, the game's soundtrack, an artbook, two pins, and an art card. The soundtrack of Valfaris was composed by Curt Victor Bryant, a former bassist and guitarist of the extreme metal band Celtic Frost.

Valfaris was released for Microsoft Windows and Nintendo Switch on October 10, 2019, and later for PlayStation 4 and Xbox One in November. The game was also released for Amazon Luna on December 3, 2020.

== Reception ==
Reception

Aggregate score
Aggregator	Score
Metacritic	PC: 86/100 (Note: Score based on 12 reviews.); PS4: 80/100 (Note: Score based on 9 reviews.); XONE: 80/100 (Note: Score based on 8 reviews.); NS: 79/100 (Note: Score based on 19 reviews.)

Review scores
Publication	Score
Famitsu	8/10, 8/10, 8/10, 7/10
Hardcore Gamer	4/5
Nintendo Life	6/10
Push Square	8/10
Windows Central	3.5/5

Valfaris received "generally favorable" reviews according to review aggregator Metacritic. It received a score of 31 out of 40 from Famitsu, based on individual reviews of 8, 8, 8, and 7.

Liam Croft from Push Square praised the game's platforming sections, weapon variety, and visuals. He called the boss fights "incredibly cool", but felt that the game's enemies respawned too quickly. Dom Reseigh-Lincoln from Nintendo Life liked the Valfaris extreme metal soundtrack and the visuals. He believed that the Resurrection Idols made saving the game easier. He also felt that enemies respawned too quickly, and thought that the game needed a dodge button.

Windows Central writer Brendan Lowry rated Valfaris 3.5/5 stars, writing that it was an "excellent" game, but felt that it was held back by design and technical flaws. James Cunningham of Hardcore Gamer praised the game's "brutal" environments and liked the "monstrous abominations" of its bosses.

Kellen Beck from Mashable complemented the game's metal soundtrack, and believed that Valfaris was a combination of "really well-done" elements. He called the boss fights "unique" and recommended the game for those looking for a "fun" action platformer.

== Sequel ==
A sequel titled Valfaris: Mecha Therion was released on November 21, 2023 for Windows, Nintendo Switch, PlayStation 4, PlayStation 5, Xbox One, and Xbox Series X/S, published by Big Sugar.

Unlike its predecessor, Mecha Therion is a 2.5D shoot 'em up. Steel Mantis originally planned to make a sequel to Slain!, but Andrew suggested that the team make a sequel to Valfaris. Thomas agreed, writing in a PlayStation.Blog that he was "immediately enthused".
