= One Night Stand (video game) =

2016 video game

- Promotional art
- Developer: Kinmoku
- Engine: Ren'Py
- Platforms: Microsoft Windows, macOS, Linux, Nintendo Switch, PlayStation 4, Xbox One
- Release: Microsoft Windows, macOS, Linux: WW: October 20, 2016; Nintendo Switch, PlayStation 4, Xbox One: WW: October 4, 2019
- Genre: Visual novel
- Mode: Single-player

One Night Stand is a visual novel video game developed by Kinmoku. Players take the role of a man who wakes up from a drunken one-night stand beside a stranger and must piece together the events of the previous night. It was based on a free game Kinmoku wrote for a game jam at itch.io. One Night Stand was released for PC in 2016, and Nintendo Switch, PlayStation 4 and Xbox One in 2019.

== Gameplay ==
Players take the role of a man who has just woken up beside a woman in her apartment. Despite not remembering the events of the previous night, the player learns their character has had sex with the woman. When the woman leaves the room, the player has the opportunity to look around, then question the woman about the various objects found. Based on the player's actions and dialogue choices, they can unlock many different endings, ranging from being angrily kicked out to the possibility of friendship. In the most recent update, there is an ending of her playing the guitar and becoming more than friends with the character.

== Development ==
One Night Stand is independent video game developer Lucy Blundell's first game. It is based on a free game that Blundell designed with a friend for a game jam at itch.io. The inspiration came from a young man she saw on public transportation. While trying to guess at reasons for his miserable-looking state, she found the idea that he was recovering from a drunken one-night stand interesting. The game is rotoscoped based on footage that Blundell shot of herself via a cell phone. One Night Stand was developed using the free Ren'Py visual novel software, and Blundell credited its community with supporting her.

The free version of One Night Stand was released on March 24, 2016. The commercial version was released on October 20 on itch.io and November 7 on Steam. Blundell credited the free version as making the Steam greenlight process easier. The free version also acted as a demo, which she said helped to dispel players' fears that the game would be outside their demographic, though she said the free version's popularity eclipsed that of the commercial version. Ports for Nintendo Switch, PlayStation 4 and Xbox One were released in October 2019 by Ratalaika Games.

== Reception ==
Reception

Aggregate score
Aggregator	Score
Metacritic	NS: 73/100; PS4: 73/100

Emad Ahmed of the New Statesman wrote that One Night Stand takes a more realistic approach than similar games. Comparing it to other games that feature physical relationships, Ahmed cited it as an example of using dialogue to tell a story rather than as a gameplay mechanic used to reach a desired conclusion. Kill Screen wrote that the initial mystery – what happened the previous night – becomes less interesting than learning about the woman and trying to find a happy ending. At Hardcore Gamer, Derrick Bettis wrote, "One Night Stand feels more like a think piece than a proper game", as it does not introduce any unique insights but allows gamers to discuss their views on the topic. Johnny Chiodini of Eurogamer wrote that the game captures the feelings of awkwardness and vulnerability following a one-night stand well.
