= Dry Drowning =

2019 video game

- Developer: Studio V
- Publishers: VLG Publishing, WhisperGames
- Director: Giacomo Masi
- Designers: Giacomo Masi, Samuele Zolfanelli
- Programmer: Samuele Zolfanelli
- Artists: Giulia Carli, Samuele Zolfanelli
- Writer: Giacomo Masi
- Composers: Giorgio Maioli, Alessandro Masi
- Engine: Unity
- Platforms: Windows, Nintendo Switch
- Release: Windows; August 2, 2019; Switch; February 22, 2021
- Genre: Visual novel
- Mode: Single-player

Dry Drowning is a cyberpunk mystery visual novel developed by Studio V and published by VLG Publishing and WhisperGames for Microsoft Windows on August 2, 2019. It was released on the Nintendo Switch on February 22, 2021.

== Gameplay ==
The player takes control of Mordred Foley and has to read through the story, while making decisions at certain points. Depending on the choices, the player can influence the relationship to other characters as well as the course of the game, discovering more than 150 story branches, and eventually reach one out of three different endings with variations. The game also includes passages where the player has to find clues or items on the screen by clicking on them. These can be used in interrogation scenes with certain characters in order to unmask them and discover their lies. Throughout the game, the player has access to an in-game operating system called AquaOS. With that, they can re-read their conversations, look at their found items, and read biographies of the characters encountered.

== Plot ==
The game is set in the fictional and totalitarian city Nova Polemos in Europa in 2066. Mordred Foley and Hera Kairis are private investigators and before the events of the game, they sent two of the most dangerous serial killers ever, Jennifer Kingston and Robert Herrington, to the electric chair. However, after their execution, their agency underwent an investigation for falsifying the evidence presented during the case, which completely destroyed its reputation. Now they want to restart their careers and lives, while dealing with their past traumas. Soon, Mordred is caught up in several cases that all led him to believe that the dreaded serial killer named Pandora has returned. In order to solve these cases, both Mordred and Hera have to face their pasts and fears, all while a racist political party is about to make the lives of refugees in Nova Polemos even worse.

== Development ==
The game was initially conceived by Giacomo Masi and Samuele Zolfanelli, then developed by Studio V and directed and written by Giacomo Masi. It was originally written in Italian and translated into English, Chinese, Japanese, Korean, and German. The soundtrack was composed, written, and performed by Giorgio Maioli. The ending theme and Hera's pieces, performed on piano, were created by Alessandro Masi. The background and character artworks were made by Giulia Carli, other graphic elements such as the UI were created by Samuele Zolfanelli. The developers cited L.A. Noire, Ace Attorney, Blade Runner and Heavy Rain as some of their inspirations for the game.

=== Releases ===
Dry Drowning was originally released on Microsoft Windows through Steam, GOG, Itch.io, and Utomik in August 2019. In July 2019, Giacomo Masi announced the game would be released for Xbox One in 2020, though it was not released that year. A Nintendo Switch port was released on February 22, 2021, and a version for PlayStation 4 is set to release in 2021.

== Reception ==
Reception

Aggregate scores
| Aggregator | Score |
|---|---|
| Metacritic | PC: 68/100; NS: 80/100 |
| OpenCritic | 55% recommend |

According to review aggregator platform Metacritic, Dry Drowning received "mixed or average reviews" for PC based on 11 reviews and "generally favorable reviews" for Nintendo Switch based on 6 reviews. Fellow review aggregator OpenCritic assessed that the game received fair approval, being recommended by 55% of critics.

4players.de gave a positive rating of 80% and wrote: "Stylish noir thriller with an interesting story, but mechanical limitations – despite a variety of possible interactions."

Screen Rant gave a mixed rating of 3 out of 5 stars and wrote, "Dry Drowning may be a fair bit messy, but there's charm here. Players who are willing to embrace the cheesier elements will find some joy in its well-crafted setting and a decent murder mystery plot. The game is constrictive and lacks the genuine shock and engagement of top tier visual novels like Doki Doki Literature Club!, but there are some moments of clever world building and a strong enough mystery propelling it."

The Italian review site SpazioGames gave a positive rating of 8.5 out of 10 points and wrote: "Dry Drowning is a very good game with great narrative experience. Every relationship between the characters is layered to increase player involvement, and each choice has different consequences. A thriller game that deserves to be played."

=== Awards ===
The game won Best of EGS 2019 and Best of JOIN 2019 awards, an honorable mention at GAMEROME and was nominated as "Best Italian Debut Game" at the Italian Video Game Awards 2020. It was also declared Best Game at Join The Indie 2019.
