= The Eternal Castle Remastered =

2019 video game

- Developers: Leonard Menchiari; Daniele Vicinanzo; Giulio Perrone
- Publisher: SEVERED PRESS PTY LTD
- Platforms: Windows, Switch, PlayStation 4, PlayStation 5
- Release: Windows; 5 January 2019; Switch; 15 May 2020; PS4, PS5; 24 June 2021
- Genres: Adventure, platform
- Mode: Single-player

The Eternal Castle Remastered is an adventure, platform game, cinematic platform game developed by Leonard Menchiari and released in 2019. It was released for Microsoft Windows, Nintendo Switch, PlayStation 4, and PlayStation 5. Set in a far future, the game follows a colonist whose ship crashes on Earth during an attempt to flee the planet. The game is a faux remaster of a non-existent 1987 game, The Eternal Castle.

== Reception ==
Reception

Aggregate scores
Aggregator	Score
Metacritic	PC: 73/100; Switch: 73/100
OpenCritic	63% recommend

Review scores
Publication	Score
Game Informer	6.5/10
GameSpot	8/10
Gamezebo	4/5
Nintendo Life	9/10

The Eternal Castle received generally positive reviews. Review aggregator OpenCritic assessed that the game received fair approval, being recommended by 63% of critics.
