= Minoria =

2019 indie Metroidvania game

- Developer: Bombservice
- Publisher: DANGEN Entertainment
- Release: August 27, 2019
- Genre: Metroidvania
- Mode: Single-player

Minoria is an indie Metroidvania game developed by Brazilian studio Bombservice and published by DANGEN Entertainment. It was released on August 27, 2019, for Windows, and on September 10, 2020, for PlayStation 4, Xbox One and Nintendo Switch. It is a spiritual sequel to the Momodora series with 2.5D graphics. It has a similar gothic horror tone as Momodora: Reverie Under the Moonlight and revolves around warrior nuns who are sent into the ruins of the Kingdom of Ramezia to free Princesses who were kidnapped by heretical witches. The game received mixed reviews from critics, who praised it for its combat mechanics and graphics, but criticized it for its "uneven" quality and short length.

== Plot ==
The game revolves around two nuns, the main character, Sister Semilla, and her companion Sister Fran, who serve the church known as the Sacred Office. They are sent into the ruins of the Kingdom of Ramezia to stop a group of witches led by Princess Poeme, who has betrayed her sister, Princess Amelia Soliette. As they defeat the witches in their fight to rescue Amelia, they uncover written evidence that the Church and its Saints are heavily corrupt, and that the Sacred Office is trying to destroy the witches to ensure their theological supremacy, driving the nature-worshiping witches to fight in order to prevent their own destruction. This causes Sister Fran to begin losing faith in their mission. They finally catch up to Poeme, who has summoned a tremendous Ceremonial Forest to bring power to the witches. Semilla battles and defeats Poeme, and Amelia subsequently orders Semilla to kill her. If Semilla follows through, both Semilla and Fran are elevated to Sainthood and the witches are persecuted indefinitely, while Fran questions the morality of their decision. If Semilla refuses to follow orders, a second ending results in which Fran attempts to convince Amelia of the church's evil. Amelia becomes enraged and murders both Fran and Poeme, while Semilla is excommunicated. However, the Church is forced to make a truce with the witches, suggesting that the world is slowly moving towards peace.

== Reception ==
Reception

Aggregate scores
Aggregator	Score
Metacritic	PC: 73/100; NS: 70/100; PS4: 76/100
OpenCritic	61% recommend

Review scores
Publication	Score
Destructoid	6/10
Nintendo Life	8/10

The game received an aggregate score of 73/100 on Metacritic for the PC version, indicating "mixed or average" reviews. Fellow review aggregator OpenCritic assessed that the game received fair approval, being recommended by 61% of critics.

Ollie Reynolds of Nintendo Life rated the game's Switch version 8/10, saying that they would "hate to see [it] slip under the radar". Calling the game's combat "impressive" and better than games such as Bloodstained: Ritual of the Night, the battles with witches were praised as most exciting. However, they criticized the environmental design, saying it was "rather samey" and easy to get lost.

Elizabeth Henges of RPG Site rated the game's PC version 7/10, saying that the game was "solid", but criticizing certain aspects of combat such as the lack of hit stun compared to Momodora 4. Calling the game "far from perfect", she nevertheless said that she was excited for a sequel that fixed the issues and made it more polished.

Chris Carter of Destructoid rated the game 6/10, saying it was not "quite as on point" as Momodora 4, but that it was still "mostly worth exploring". Calling the combat "very smooth", he criticized the "wonkier" spell system and the map system having no room for manual marking. Calling it an "uneven game", he nevertheless stated that "it just shows the world how talented Bombservice really is".
