= Adult Swim Games =

Video game publishing division of Adult Swim

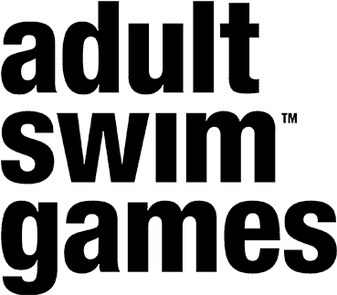
- Type: Division
- Industry: Video games
- Founded: 2005
- Defunct: 2026
- Fate: Dormancy; All games closed/sold/removed
- Headquarters: 1065 Williams Street NW, Atlanta, Georgia, U.S.
- Area served: Worldwide
- Parent: Williams Street
- Website: www.adultswim.com/games

Adult Swim Games (stylized as adult swim games; formerly Williams Street Games) was the video game publishing division of The Cartoon Network, Inc. While Adult Swim has been publishing games since 2005, primarily based on their in-house franchises, it became an official publisher of original indie games in 2011. The publishing division has been praised by critics for the originality and quality of its games.

The publisher has been largely dormant since 2020, following layoffs at then-owner WarnerMedia, with Samurai Jack: Battle Through Time being their last new title. All of Adult Swim Games' indie titles were either returned to their developers or de-listed in 2024, along with Samurai Jack: Battle Through Time. With Pocket Mortys set to close on April 13, 2026, the Adult Swim Games website was shuttered in February 2026, leaving Rick and Morty: Virtual Rick-ality as the last available title from Adult Swim Games.

== History ==
=== Early history (2005–2010) ===
Adult Swim partnered with Midway Games in 2005 to begin development on video games based on Aqua Teen Hunger Force, Space Ghost Coast to Coast, The Brak Show and Sealab 2021. The game based on Aqua Teen Hunger Force, Aqua Teen Hunger Force Zombie Ninja Pro-Am, was released on November 5, 2007, for PlayStation 2. The game is a golf game with fighting and racing levels. A video game based on Harvey Birdman: Attorney at Law has been released by Capcom for PlayStation 2, PlayStation Portable and Wii on January 8, 2008.

Various third-party Flash-based games, such as Robot Unicorn Attack and the Five Minutes to Kill (Yourself) series, were once available for free play on the Adult Swim website, but have been removed from the site in 2020, due to the discontinuation of Flash Player. Adult Swim have also published a number of iPhone, iPad, and Android games, including Robot Unicorn Attack 1 & 2, Amateur Surgeon, Five Minutes to Kill (Yourself): Wedding Day, and Pocket Mortys.

In December 2012, Valve announced costumes for the online first person shooter Team Fortress 2 based on Adult Swim characters. The video game Saints Row: The Third features an in game radio station listenable on most vehicles titled “WDDT CPDG The Swim” which shuffles a collection of songs that were featured on Adult Swim shows and was hosted by Jon from the Adult Swim show Delocated. The video game Poker Night 2 features Brock Samson from The Venture Bros. as a main character.

=== Adult Swim Games (2011–present) ===
In 2011, Adult Swim hired Steve Gee to run their games division, in an effort to find original content that fit the brand of Adult Swim - described as "bizarre and absurd humor". This effort was inspired by the financial success of earlier mobile games such as Robot Unicorn Attack and Amateur Surgeon. The publisher began to seek out new indie games to partner with and publish, in an effort to provide a platform for indie games.

On February 15, 2013, Adult Swim published Super House of Dead Ninjas on Steam under their Adult Swim Games publishing label. Adult Swim Games continued to publish select indie games on Steam, including Super Puzzle Platformer Deluxe, Völgarr the Viking, Kingsway, Rain World, Jazzpunk and Duck Game.

On May 22, 2018, Adult Swim acquired their first video game developer, Big Pixel Studios, the development studio behind Pocket Mortys. The studio would later close at the end of 2020 following WarnerMedia's decision to restructure the division. In 2020, Adult Swim released Samurai Jack: Battle Through Time, meant to serve as a conclusion to the series. In 2022, Adult Swim lost the rights of Rain World to Videocult following prolonged legal disputes, with Akupara Games publishing it.

In 2024, it was announced by the developer of Small Radios Big Televisions, that the game would be removed from all store fronts due to "internal business changes." Parent company Warner Bros. further announced plans to retire more Adult Swim games from online stores later in 2024. However, by May 2024, at least two games from the Adult Swim Games label, Small Radios Big Television and Duck Game, stated that Warner Bros. was returning the publishing rights back to the developers and allow them to continue to distribute the game on storefronts.

== List of games published (selection) ==
Video games published by Adult Swim Games
Year	Name	Notes
2004	InuYasha: Demon Tournament	
2005	Fullmetal Alchemist: Iron & Flame	
2007
2007	Bible Fight	
2008
2008	Amateur Surgeon	
2009	Pizza City	Also developer
2009	5 Minutes to Kill Yourself	Also developer
2010	Robot Unicorn Attack	
2010	Give Up, Robot	
2010	Give Up Robot 2	
2011	Hot Throttle	
2011	Major Mayhem	
2011	Lee-Lee's Quest	Also developer
2011	Monsters Ate My Condo	
2011	Snoticles	
2012	Girls Like Robots	
2012	Super Mole Escape	
2012	Burrito Bison Revenge	
2013	Super House of Dead Ninjas	
2013	Super Puzzle Platformer Deluxe	
2013	Fist Puncher	
2013	Amateur Surgeon 3: Tag Team Trauma	
2013	Volgarr the Viking	
2013	Soundodger	Until June 29, 2024
2013	Westerado	
2014	Castle Doombad	
2014	Jazzpunk	
2014	Duck Game	Publishing duties moved to CORPTRON GAMES CORP
2014	Mega Coin Squad	
2014	Lesbian Spider-Queens of Mars	
2014	Bionic Chainsaw Pogo Gorilla	Also developer
2015	Robot Unicorn Attack Evolution	
2015	Westerado: Double Barreled	
2015	Zenzizenzic	Also developer
2015	Oblitus	Also developer
2015	Traverser	
2016	Pocket Mortys	
2016	Peter Panic	Also developer
2016	Wasted	Also developer
2016	Headlander	
2016	Small Radios Big Televisions	
2016	Glittermitten Grove	
2016	Frog Fractions 2	
2016	Lee-Lee's Quest 2	
2017	Rise & Shine	
2017	Desync	
2017	Rain World	Publishing duties moved to Akupara Games
2017	Rick and Morty: Virtual Rick-ality	
2017	Kingsway	Publishing duties moved to Andrew Morrish
2017	Battle Chef Brigade	
2018	Pool Panic	
2018	Death's Gambit	
2020	Samurai Jack: Battle Through Time	
2020	Ray's The Dead	Helped fund the game.
2024	Ninja Kamui: Shinobi Origins	
