= Phetus =

American artist (born 20th century)

Phetus' Phat Phace logo

Phetus (born 20th century) is an American artist with roots in the graffiti and street art movement.

Originally from Huntington, Long Island, and now based in Manhattan, "Phetus" has been creating artwork under his "Phat Phace" icon since 1988. He began his career as a graffiti artist by taking trips into New York City.

He was the founding member of the creative multimedia studio Elite Gudz. As the inventor and creator, Phetus along with the Elite Gudz staff released the "Graffiti Spraycan" application on iTunes.

== History ==
Phetus grew up on Long Island in the 1980s, during the golden era of the hip-hop scene. He gained the attention of artists like Public Enemy (group) and is said to have known them before they were famous.

When Flavor Flav opened a barber shop in Freeport, Long Island he recruited Phetus to do airbrushing on shirts, jackets and other apparel. He also wore an airbrushed piece by Phetus on The Arsenio Hall Show in an episode about the controversy of Public Enemy. Phetus went on to paint the backdrop for Public Enemy's performance with U2 at the "Stop Sellafield" concert. His work can also be seen in the official video for "Tap the Bottle (Twist the Cap)" by Young Black Teenagers. Phetus did all the graffiti on the set of the video; a large-scale phat phace can be seen behind the group. A mutual friend of rapper Erick Sermon introduced Phetus to the producer, and that meeting led to Phetus illustrating the "Def Squad" logo for the trio.

Throughout the 1990s and early 2000s, Phetus continued to create custom clothing pieces for hip-hop artists such as LL Cool J, Ludacris and Game.

In 2002 Phetus opened up Concrete Vibes in Long Island. Following the path of stores in New York like The Scrapyard, the store was the first on Long Island to sell graffiti supplies like aerosol paint and markers, independent designer clothing, designer toys and other lifestyle products. Monthly art shows were also held at the store, and the store held a book signing for Cope2. Concrete Vibes was the host to graffiti artist Iz the Wiz. In 2003 Iz held his first solo artist showcase on Long Island at Concrete Vibes.

In 2005 Phetus relocated his studio and worked with graffiti artist Richie SEEN. He set up shop in the back of "Tattoo SEEN" in the Throgs Neck section in the Bronx. While working alongside SEEN, Phnetus designed the packaging for Planet6, SEEN's designer toy brand, along with the character development for the Phony Baloney designer toy line. This project led to work with Terminal Press, where Phetus helped create the Phony-Baloney comic book.

Phetus formed the Elite Gudz multi-media design studio in 2008.

In 2012 Phetus moved his art studio to the Flatiron District of Manhattan and shared a creative space with the artists Anton Kadinsky, sculptor Carlos Mare139 Rodriguez, Allan Ket and Alice Mizrachi. For the next 2 years this was his creative work space.

== Creative works ==
Concrete Immortalz is a comic series created by graffiti artist Phetus. The series is built on the idea that art progresses with and chronicles human history, and "the graffiti movement is the artistic embodiment of current times." The series' main protagonist is The Wall Lord, a graffiti artist who writes messages of hope and defiance against a repressive government. On January 7, 2010, Phetus and street artist Such painted a mural image of The Wall Lord on a subway car installation outside of Tuff City Tattoos in Bronx. NY Phetus was also joined by Cope2, T-Kid, Ban2, Indie and Cheez who came through to destroy the piece once it was completed as a tribute to the real life actions that go on within the graffiti subculture. A billboard-sized mural for Concrete Immortalz was created by Phetus and Such across a block-long industrial complex at 5 Pointz in Long Island City.

Elite Gudz invented and developed the iOS app Graffiti Spray Can, which had over 5 million downloads in early 2011.

On May 24, 2011, Phetus released "We Bomb," a hip-hop single with a graffiti centric theme. The track featured Poe Rilla and was produced by Beat Butcha. The video for "We Bomb" was produced by Picture Perfect and features well known graffiti locations throughout New York City. The "We Bomb" EP also featured several remixes, including dubstep and djent versions. The term "bomb" in the graffiti community commonly refers to the graffiti practice of marking up a series of surfaces in one area. The track was featured in the Graffiti Spray Can PRO and Graffiti Spray Can HD applications by Elite Gudz.

The video for the song, directed by Picture Perfect, was filmed on location at several famous NYC graffiti landmarks including 5 Pointz in Queens, Keith Haring's Crack is Wack wall in Harlem, Cope2's wall at Boon Ave. in the Bronx, and the American Trash bar. The "We Bomb" EP, released on picture disc vinyl, featured several remixes, including dubstep and djent versions.

== Fashion and clothing ==
Phetus began designing original garments. After a chance meeting with the hip hop artist Ludacris, Phetus designed the wardrobe for the "Chicken & Beer" video and tour Game's "One Blood" video featured 36 custom Black Wall Street garments, after which Phetus designed various garments that appeared in future Game videos, most recognizably the "hip hop broke my heart" shirt in the "My Life" video featuring Lil Wayne. Phetus helped develop LL Cool J's apparel line "Todd Smith", which was eventually bought out by Sears.

In Fall 2010, Phetus stood on home plate at Yankee Stadium to present Hank Steinbrenner with a custom "Hanks Yanks" graffiti style T-shirt.

In June 2010. Phetus painted a mural for KarmaLoop TV across three walls while simultaneously hand screening a run of T-shirts, both featuring his "Phat Phace" logo and "Phe-Gnome" character, plundering a village as it burns to the ground. At Mercedes-Benz Fashion Week, fashion magazine Vevant.com commissioned Phetus to transform their Fashion Week booth into an art gallery. Phetus created original art installations for each day of the 8-day event in themes relating to the world of fashion and current events.

At Mercedes-Benz Fashion Week, fashion magazine Vevant.com commissioned Phetus to transform their Fashion Week booth into an art gallery. Phetus created original art installations for each day of the 8-day event in themes relating to the world of fashion and current events.

2001 Phetus was hired by The Calvin Klein Company to paint there showroom to collaborate with the release of graffiti inspired undergarments.

2014 Phetus and Toshio Yori launched the brand "Smiles&Cries".

== Art exhibit history ==
Phetus was a part of the "Green Umbrellas for a Green Cause" campaign with Starbucks. The campaign included custom umbrellas designed by American artists and celebrities. The umbrellas were then auctioned off, with the proceeds donated to Global Green USA.

In December 2008, Phetus' Goons & Bots characters debuted at East West in Westbury, NY. The collection of characters from Goons & Bots can be found in some of Phetus' mural work. Some of the collection was also featured at Fangoria Presents: Night of the Living Decks in 2009. Two skate decks painted with goons and bots, respectively, were featured as part of a group art show of coffin-shaped skate boards.

In 2009 Phetus was asked to donate a painting to Barack Obama's campaign, "There's a story to be told..."

In 2009 Phetus contributed to the Topps Star Wars Galaxy 5 trading card set. The cards sold out. In 2010, original sketch cards from Phetus were displayed and auctioned at the 1st Annual 2nd Ave. Trading Card Convention and Swap Meet.

In 2009 Toy Qube host the "In Your Phace" show. Wooden and neon versions of Phetus' Phat Phaces were on display along with canvases, skate decks and a 7-foot tall rotating cube featuring the characters. They were also featured in the Cubez event at New York Comic Con 2010. Since then, Goons & Bots have been in their own iOS applications.

In May 2010 his artwork was exhibited at "Power Arts for Power Ups – Mr.Power Custom Show", On the same day the artist also exhibited at "Thought Processor: The NYC Series.", featuring custom paper toys accompanied by paintings by Phetus. The designs were also available online for download after the show so fans could make their own figures out of the same pieces featured in the gallery.

In Nov. 2010 it was announced that The Art Hustle would profile Phetus in an upcoming series. The Art Hustle series of trading cards profile artists with backgrounds in street art, illustration, aerosol art and more.

Dec. 2012 "FREE AGENTS" artist collective showcase at Art basel Miami Florida host by The Miami Light Project.

March 2013 "BK ARTSHOW" group art exhibit

April 2013 "Latido Americano" Group street art and mural excursion in Peru, hosted by entes y pesimo A two-week event that was traveled with fellow artist Ket One, where the two American artists caught up with fellow artists from South America and jointly created graffiti and street art.

June 2013 "Demons From The Bottle" solo showcase at White Rabbit NYC

July 2013 "PHETUS88" solo showcase at Studio J in Long Island City

Sept. 2013 "Colorado Crush" a 3-day outside graffiti art showcase in Rhino district of Denver CO.

Nov. 2013 "SECRET WALLS" art battle: Secret Walls held a special "2 on 2" spray paint battle at BK Bazaar night market in New York, with the PillasBros Vs. Phetus & Deps, who went on to be the winners by crowd vote.
