= Battle Chef Brigade =

2017 puzzle video game

- Developer: Trinket Studios
- Publishers: Adult Swim Games (original, Microsoft Store); Trinket Studios (current)
- Engine: Unity
- Platforms: Windows, Nintendo Switch, PlayStation 4
- Release: 20 November 2017
- Genres: Brawler, puzzle
- Mode: Single-player

Battle Chef Brigade is a brawler and puzzle video game developed by Trinket Studios and published by Adult Swim Games. The game was originally released for Windows and Nintendo Switch in November 2017.

== Premise ==
Battle Chef Brigade takes place in the fantasy world of Victusia where the populace has discovered a way to safely hunt and cook the dangerous monsters that roam the world. This has resulted in the establishment of the Battle Chef Brigade, a group of elite warrior-chefs who protect the residents from the monsters and turn their remains into haute cuisine.

The game follows two amateur cooks, Mina and Thrash, as they try to gain membership to the Brigade by entering a cooking contest against other hopefuls.

== Gameplay ==
Battle Chef Brigade combines gameplay from tile-matching puzzle video games and side-scrolling brawler games.

The main mode of the game involves players competing in an Iron Chef-style cooking contest against an opponent, scored by up to three judges who award points based on the quality of a player's dishes and if they had met any requirements. Players are given a time limit and an ingredient that should be included in their dishes, while each judge may prefer a certain flavor profile.

Cooking contests typically start with a combat phase in which players set out to gather ingredients from plants and hunt monsters in a small area using physical or magical attacks. After defeat, the monsters drop body parts which the player collects as ingredients for their dishes, after which the player returns to their kitchen in the cooking arena. The subsequent cooking phase is then initiated by dropping gathered ingredients into cookware, where they are turned into differently colored "flavor gems". With the flavor gems in the 4x4 cooking zone, the player can rotate them like Puyo Puyo, and when gems of the same color are aligned, they combine to increase their rank and the quality of the dish. As the gems are matched and rank up, the player's dish increases its quality. Once finished cooking, the player has to deliver the dish to the judges before time runs out.

The cooking gameplay with tile-matching. There is different cookware and a match timer.

== Development and release ==
Battle Chef Brigade was developed by Trinket Studios, which was founded by former employees of Wideload Games. In 2014, the developers crowdfunded over US$100,000 through a Kickstarter campaign.

Battle Chef Brigade was published by Adult Swim Games and released for Windows via Steam, GOG.com, and the Microsoft Store and for Nintendo Switch on 20 November 2017. It is currently self-published by Trinket Studios except on the Microsoft Store, where it remains published by Adult Swim Games.

== Reception ==
Reception

Aggregate score
| Aggregator | Score |
|---|---|
| Metacritic | 80/100; 81/100 (NS) |

Review scores
| Publication | Score |
|---|---|
| Destructoid | 8/10 |
| Game Informer | 8.25/10 |
| GamesRadar+ | 4/5 |
| IGN | 8/10 |
| Nintendo Life | 8/10 |
| Nintendo World Report | 9/10 |
| Polygon | 7/10 |
| USgamer | 4/5 |

Battle Chef Brigade received "generally favorable" reviews from professional critics according to review aggregator website Metacritic. GamesRadar+ ranked it 24th on their list of the 25 Best Games of 2017.

The game was nominated for "Game, Puzzle" and "Performance in a Comedy, Lead" with Erica Mendez as the character Mina at the National Academy of Video Game Trade Reviewers Awards.
