= 21st Street Games =

Design studio based in Manhattan's Flatiron District

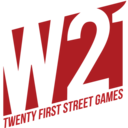
- Company type: Private - Game Development Studio
- Industry: Video games
- Founded: 2011
- Headquarters: New York, New York
- Key people: Sandy Fliderman CTO & Founder; Brian Ferrara Creative Director
- Products: Techno Kitten Adventure, Nyan Cat Adventure
- Number of employees: 100 (2012)
- Website: www.21stgames.com

21st Street Games was a design studio based in Manhattan's Flatiron District with satellite studios in both South Florida and Mumbai, India. The studio specialized in gaming, mobile application, and web and technology development, and was best known for the game Techno Kitten Adventure.

== Platforms ==
21st Street Games has published games on the iOS App Store, Xbox Live Indie Games market, Android Market and Windows Phone market and Facebook. In a blog post on the company's website dated January 1, 2013, it was announced that future games would be developed under Zaah.

== Flagship Titles ==
=== Techno Kitten Adventure ===
Techno Kitten Adventure is a Side-scrolling video game developed by creative design studio Elite Gudz and 21st Street Games for the iOS App Store, Xbox Live Indie Games market, Android Market and Windows Phone market. In the game, players control a flying kitten that must avoid obstacles and distractions timed to techno music. The game was first released on Xbox Live Indie Games on September 6, 2010 by Nick Kinkade (xMonox). Since its initial release, Techno Kitten Adventure has been one of the top downloaded and top rated games on the Xbox Live Indie Games market.

=== Nyan Cat Adventure ===
After Techno Kitten Adventure, Nyan Cat Adventure is also a Side-scrolling video game simulator to Techno Kitten Adventure being a Single-button score-based arcade action having 5 game modes, over 8+ characters to choose from. avoiding obstacles and collecting items like pills or powerups. NCA was released in Dec. 8-13, 2011 on Xbox Live Indie Games. The game was based on the Nyan Cat viral animation. On March 20, 2012 Nyan Cat Adventure was also released on iOS App Store for iPhone, iPod touch and iPad.

== List of Games ==
- Nyan Cat Adventure (2011) Xbox Live Indie Games, iOS (2012)
- T-Bone Jackson's Super Pee-Wee Pass Challenge (2012) iOS
- Techno Kitten Adventure (2011) iOS, Xbox Live Indie Games, Android, Windows Phone, Facebook
- The Tossing Dead (2012)
