= Snoticles =

2011 video game

- App icon
- Developer(s): Gamelion
- Publisher(s): Adult Swim Games
- Platform(s): iOS
- Release: December 15, 2011
- Genre(s): Puzzle
- Mode(s): Single-player

Snoticles is a 2011 puzzle video game developed by Gamelion and published by Adult Swim Games. It was released on December 15, 2011, for iOS.

== Gameplay ==
In Snoticles, the player shoots creatures named Snoticles to defeat enemy Blots.

The player controls creatures called Snoticles and must get rid of the enemy Blots.

== Release ==
Snoticles was released for iOS on December 15, 2011.

== Reception ==
Reception

Aggregate score
Aggregator	Score
Metacritic	88/100

Review scores
Publication	Score
TouchArcade	3.5/5
148Apps	4/5
AppSpy	5/5
Modojo	4.5/5

On Metacritic, the game has a "generally favorable" rating of 88% based on five critics.

Multiple critics gave positive reviews.
