= Nyan Cat =

Internet meme

Nyan Cat as seen in the original video

Nyan Cat is a YouTube video uploaded in April 2011, which became an Internet meme. The video merged a Japanese denpa song with an animated cartoon cat with a Pop-Tart for a torso flying through space and leaving a rainbow trail behind. The video ranked at number five on the list of most viewed YouTube videos in 2011.

== Origin ==
=== Song ===
The original version of the song "Nyanyanyanyanyanyanya!" was uploaded by user "daniwell" to the Japanese video site Niconico on July 25, 2010. The song features the Vocaloid virtual singer Hatsune Miku. The Japanese word nya (にゃ) (wikt:にゃん) is onomatopoeic, imitating the call of a cat (equivalent to English "meow"). The song was later included in the rhythm game Hatsune Miku: Project DIVA F, released by Sega in August 2012.

On January 30, 2011, a user named "Momomomo" uploaded a cover of "Nyanyanyanyanyanyanya!" featuring the UTAU voice Momone Momo. The voice source used to create the Momone Momo voice was a Japanese woman named Momoko Fujimoto.

=== Animated GIF ===
Torres's original Nyan Cat doodle

On April 2, 2011, the GIF animation of the cat was posted by 25-year-old Christopher Torres of Dallas, Texas, who uses the name "prguitarman", on his website LOL-Comics. Torres explained in an interview where the idea for the animation came from: "I was doing a donation drive for the Red Cross and in-between drawings in my Livestream video chat, two different people mentioned I should draw a 'Pop Tart' and a 'cat'." In response, he created a hybrid image of a Pop-Tart and a cat, which was developed a few days later into the animated GIF. Nyan Cat was based on a real cat: Torres' pet cat Marty, who died in November 2012 from feline infectious peritonitis.

=== YouTube video ===
YouTube user "saraj00n" (whose real name is Sara June) combined the cat animation with the "Momomomo" version of "Nyanyanyanyanyanyanya!", and uploaded it to YouTube on April 5, 2011, three days after Torres had uploaded his animation, giving it the title "Nyan Cat". The video rapidly became a success after being featured on websites including G4 and CollegeHumor. Christopher Torres said: "Originally, its name was Pop Tart Cat, and I will continue to call it so, but the Internet has reached a decision to name it Nyan Cat, and I'm happy with that choice, too."

In March 2019, ownership of the YouTube channel hosting the original Nyan Cat video was transferred to Means TV, a worker-owned video streaming service.

In November 2023, the original Nyan Cat video ceased to be available on the saraj00n YouTube channel, and its new location was given as the YouTube channel NyanCat.

=== Sale as an NFT ===
In February 2021, it was reported that the GIF's original creator, Christopher Torres, had created an updated version and sold it as a non-fungible token (NFT) for 300 ether, the equivalent of US$587,000 at the time of sale.

== Reception ==
The Nyan Cat music video reached ninth place in Business Insider's top ten viral videos of April 2011, with 7.2 million total views. The original YouTube video has received 205 million views as of May 3, 2023. Later that year, before being made private on the Nyan Cat YouTube channel, the video peaked at 210,009,029 views on November 9, 2023. Nyan Cat won a Webby Award in 2012 for "Meme of the Year".

Due to the video's popularity, many new remixes and cover versions have been made, some several hours long. There are also ringtones, wallpapers and applications created for operating systems and devices, including a progress bar substitute for Windows which would show up in various places such as the file transfer progress indicator in Windows Explorer, following a request on the subreddit "Somebody Make This". Video games were developed for iPhone, iPad, Symbian, Android, Windows Phone, and HP webOS, and a variety of flash games and mobile games such as "Snake" replicas using the cat's rainbow tail or endless runners like "Nyan Cat: Lost in Space". "Nyan Cat Adventure", by 21st Street Games is an officially licensed game. An officially licensed cryptocurrency entitled "Nyancoin" with the domain name nyanco.in (later nyan-coin.org) was launched in January 2014.

=== Website ===
Christopher Torres initially criticized the website www.nyan.cat, which originally featured a similar-looking cat with the pop tart replaced by a slice of toast, and the same background music. The site, which uses the .cat sponsored top-level domain, was described by Torres as "plagiarized". Since 2012 the website has been operated by Torres, and shows the authentic version of the cat.

== Lawsuit ==
In May 2013, Christopher Torres and Charles Schmidt, the creators of the Nyan Cat and Keyboard Cat memes respectively, jointly sued 5th Cell and Warner Bros. for copyright infringement and trademark infringement over the appearance of these characters without permission in the Scribblenauts series of video games. Torres and Schmidt have registered copyrights on their characters and have pending trademark applications on the names. Torres released a statement saying that he had tried to obtain compensation from 5th Cell and Warner Bros. for commercial use of the character, but was "disrespected and snubbed" multiple times. The suit was settled in September 2013, with Torres and Schmidt being paid for the use of the characters.

== See also ==
- Robot Unicorn Attack
- Techno Kitten Adventure
- Cats and the Internet
- List of Internet phenomena
- Memz
