= Small Radios Big Televisions =

2016 video game

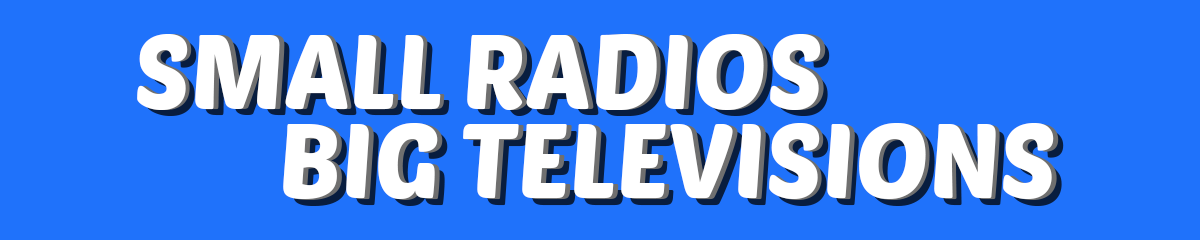
- Developers: Fire Face (Owen Deery)
- Publisher: Adult Swim Games
- Platforms: Windows, PlayStation 4
- Release: 8 November 2016
- Genre: Puzzle
- Mode: Single-player

Small Radios Big Televisions is an indie puzzle video game. The game was developed by Fire Face and released on 8 November 2016 for Microsoft Windows and PlayStation 4. Owen Deery, under the developer name Fire Face, created everything in the game, including artwork and music and wrote a custom game engine. In March of 2024, Warner Bros. Discovery told Deery that the company would be pulling the game from digital storefronts, citing "internal business changes." In response, Deery made the game free to download.

== Development ==
The game started as a free web-based prototype using WebGL and JavaScript. When the prototype attracted significant interest, Owen decided to turn it into a stand-alone game.

== Reception ==
Reception

Aggregate score
Aggregator	Score
Metacritic	PC: 67/100; PS4: 62/100

Review scores
Publication	Score
Destructoid	8.5/10
Hardcore Gamer	3.5/5
Push Square	5/10 stars

Small Radios Big Televisions received mixed reviews from critics upon release. On Metacritic, the game holds scores of 67/100 for the PC version based on 7 reviews, and 62/100 for the PlayStation 4 version based on 15 reviews.

The game received praise from critics for the unique atmosphere created by its visuals and music. The music style has been likened to Boards of Canada, which was also cited as inspiration by Owen. Several reviews voiced their dislike for the unvaried puzzles.
