= Duck Game =

2014 video game

- Steam release logo
- Developer: Landon Podbielski
- Publishers: Adult Swim Games (2015–2024); Corptron (2024–present)
- Platforms: Ouya, Linux, Windows, PlayStation 4, Nintendo Switch
- Release: Ouya: WW: May 13, 2014; Windows and Linux: WW: June 4, 2015; PS4: WW: August 22, 2017; Nintendo Switch: WW: May 2, 2019
- Genre: Action
- Modes: Single-player, multiplayer

Duck Game is a 2014 2D action game developed by Landon Podbielski and published by Corptron. (Note: Originally published by Adult Swim Games, Warner Bros. transferred publishing rights to Corptron, owned by Podbielski, in May 2024.) The game was released for the Ouya in 2014, and for Linux and Microsoft Windows in 2015. A PlayStation 4 version was released in August 2017, and a Nintendo Switch version was released in May 2019.

== Gameplay ==
Duck Game is a 2D video game that features primarily shooting and platforming mechanics. The game features a simple control scheme; beyond basic movement controls, the player can pick up or throw a weapon, use their equipped weapon, strafe (walk backwards), quack, and ragdoll.

The game is primarily played in multiplayer, with support for local or online gameplay with up to eight other players. Duck Game has a simple premise: players die in one hit, and the last player standing wins the round.

Additionally, the game has a single-player 'arcade' mode where the user can complete challenges to get tickets, which can be used to unlock in-game hats and game modifiers (such as moon gravity or explosive props).

== Development ==
Duck Game was developed by Vancouver-based developer Landon Podbielski. Podbielski originally planned to make a 2D platformer inspired by James Pond 3. A friend suggested adding a local multiplayer mode with guns and other weapons. The game was released for the Ouya on May 13, 2014. At launch, the game only featured multiplayer; in November 2014, a single-player mode was added.

The game was released for Linux and Microsoft Windows on June 4, 2015, published by Adult Swim Games. Podbielski previously composed the music for Super Puzzle Platformer Deluxe, a game developed by his friend, Andrew Morrish and published by Adult Swim Games on May 24, 2013. The company offered to publish Duck Game if Podbielski implemented an online multiplayer mode. After struggling to develop a client-server based networking model, Adult Swim Games extended their deadline and allowed Podbielski to use a peer-to-peer system instead. At the 2015 PlayStation Experience, a PlayStation 4 version of the game was announced, with its release following on August 22, 2017. On May 1, 2019, it was released for the Nintendo Switch. A major update was released in November 2020 on PC.

After parent company Warner Bros. announced plans for titles from publisher Adult Swim Games to be delisted in 2024, Podbielski confirmed that he owns the Duck Game intellectual property rights and will continue to support the title. Podbielski confirmed in May 2024 Warner Bros. would transfer publishing rights to him.

== Reception ==
Reception

Aggregate score
Aggregator	Score
Metacritic	82/100

Review score
Publication	Score
Destructoid	8.5/10

Duck Game received generally positive reviews from critics and players. The game received an average Metacritic score of 82 based on six reviews. Critics cite the multiplayer as driving the game's appeal. Reviewers likened the game to other successful 2D brawlers, including Super Smash Bros. Brawl, TowerFall, and Samurai Gunn. Otto Kratky appreciated the game's depth, praising the nuances of the game's combat and controls.

Sean Flint was critical of the name choice, saying "it describes absolutely nothing about it other than the fact that it may contain ducks". Opinions on the game's learning curve were mixed; Steven Hanson enjoyed the frenetic moments of the multiplayer, stating that "It's not the assortment of weapons that is fun, it's the quick reflexes — and their funny failures — needed to remember how they all work, despite the simple two button layout." Several reviewers have complained about the inconsistent level design, and lack of an engaging single player experience.

The game has had a small but committed competitive scene since launch, with high-level gameplay utilizing exploits and advanced techniques to elevate the skill ceiling.
