= Westerado: Double Barreled =

2015 video game

- Developer: Ostrich Banditos
- Publisher: Adult Swim Games
- Platforms: Windows; Xbox One
- Release: Microsoft Windows; April 15, 2015; Xbox One; December 9, 2016
- Genre: Action
- Modes: Single-player, multiplayer

Westerado: Double Barreled is an open-world top-down shooter indie video game developed by Dutch studio Ostrich Banditos and published by Adult Swim Games. It was released for PC on April 15, 2015, and for Xbox One on December 9, 2016. It is an enhanced, standalone version of the browser game Westerado. It takes place in the Old West and revolves around the main character's quest for revenge after their family is murdered by a mysterious desperado.

The game received positive reviews from critics, who cited its non-linear gameplay and story as strong points, but criticized its short length.

== Plot ==
Westerado is inspired by Western films with a revenge plot structure. The game begins when the main character's family is murdered and their ranch set on fire. Their brother gives them information about the killer's clothing, and they set out to get revenge. The game is styled after a Western film, with film-like effects during cutscenes.

== Gameplay ==
As a game based on a revenge plot structure, the player's goal is to discover who killed their family, through a combination of dialogue, shooting, and other errands. The murderer is one of many procedurally generated characters in the game, assembled with details such as their clothing and body type.

The main character wanders from town to town searching for information about the murderer. Sometimes, when they converse with a character, they receive a job, which can range from defending a ranch from bandits to forcing a drunkard from a saloon at gunpoint. As they complete these jobs, they gain clues towards the murderer's appearance, which are collected in a notebook and depicted on a wanted poster. The player can accuse any character of the murder at any point, and interrogate, draw their gun on, and shoot any non-player character, even in the middle of a conversation. However, killing characters can prevent the player from gaining valuable information and make the game more difficult. The game also features a faction system, and the player needs to consider how violent actions have consequences on their social standing.

The player uses a six-shooter for combat, which fires in a straight line. The player must manually load the gun, then cock and fire it. The player can later buy other weapons, like a rifle, shotgun, dual revolvers, and a tomahawk. The game can be played in co-op. The game will randomize the appearance of the killer each time, although the game's map remains the same.

== Reception ==
Westerado: Double Barreled was positively reviewed by critics, with an aggregate score of 80/100 on Metacritic for the PC version, and 76/100 for the Xbox One version.

Jed Whitaker of Destructoid rated the game 10/10, calling it "a great package with lots of replayability" and saying it "can easily be recommended for fans of Westerns or revenge flicks". He also stated that "no other experience that I've played has done revenge so well". The Escapist praised the game's small but reactive open world, proclaiming that "the subversive genius of Westerado is that you can take any approach to solving the mystery - or goofing off along the way - and the game adapts to it. ... Even if you kill a main character - or all of them - you can continue playing the game unimpeded." The game received a "Recommended" rating from Rock Paper Shotgun, with Alec Meer stating that the game was "enormously satisfying", but criticizing the game's tone for being "all over the place". Christopher Livingston of PC Gamer rated the game 83/100, calling it very enjoyable, but saying the gunfights can become a "key-mashing hassle". Sam Greer of Eurogamer stated the game was memorable because she was able to choose her path through the game and its narrative, with emotional beats being effective because the player decided them. She stated that it was more effective than games like Red Dead Redemption 2, which utilized linear missions, with the setting being merely the backdrop for those missions.
