= Jazzpunk =

2014 video game

- Developer: Necrophone Games
- Publisher: Adult Swim Games
- Directors: Luis Hernandez; Jess Brouse
- Artist: Luis Hernandez
- Writers: Luis Hernandez; Jess Brouse
- Composer: Luis Hernandez
- Engine: Unity
- Platforms: Microsoft Windows, OS X, Linux, PlayStation 4
- Release: Windows, OS X, Linux; February 7, 2014; PlayStation 4; September 20, 2016
- Genre: Adventure
- Mode: Single-player

Jazzpunk is a 2014 adventure video game developed by Necrophone Games and published by Adult Swim Games. The game was released for Microsoft Windows, OS X and Linux in February 2014. A director's cut of the game, self-published by Necrophone Games, was released for the PlayStation 4 in September 2016, and for personal computer platforms in June 2017.

== Gameplay ==
Jazzpunk is a single-player, first-person adventure game, focusing on exploration and comedy over puzzle-solving. Each mission has one central objective, but the player is free to explore the game world at their own pace, which is populated with a large number of interactive NPCs, each with their own action or gag. Mini-games, including mini-golf, a Frogger clone, and a version of Duck Hunt in which the player pelts cardboard ducks with slices of bread from a toaster, also feature prominently in the game's storyline.

The game also features a minigame, titled "Wedding Qake" (later changed to "Wedding Cake"), in which players try to shoot AI-controlled enemies with wedding-themed weaponry, including wedding cake, roses, and champagne corks, in a Quake deathmatch-style contest.

== Plot ==
The game is centered on a top-secret espionage agency operating out of an abandoned subway station in a fictional place called Japanada in the late 1950s in a surreal retro-futuristic, alternate reality where the Empire of Japan conquered most of North America. The player takes the role of Polyblank, a silent protagonist. The game begins when Polyblank is mailed to the espionage agency in a human-shaped suitcase. He is then given several missions by the head of the organization, all of which begin by ingesting a dose of prescription medicine. The missions assigned to Polyblank are almost always bizarre and nonsensical, relying heavily on free association and references to older movies and video games. Tasks include degaussing and smuggling pigeons, stealing a cowboy's kidney, cross-dressing, killing a pig with a guitar, and photocopying Polyblank's buttocks to fool a security scanner (this also can be done by taking a photo off of the wall).

In the first mission, Polyblank infiltrates a Soviet consulate and recovers a data cartridge. The second mission involves poisoning a cowboy to steal his artificial kidney. After obtaining the "wetware" Polyblank is intercepted by agents in search of the kidney but escapes. Later at the Kai Tak resort while waiting for heat to die down, Polyblank receives a phone call telling him he has to find a man known as The Editor and fetch the contents of his briefcase. Polyblank meets the Editor and obtains his briefcase before being drugged and stripped of the files. Upon waking up, Polyblank follows a note to the hotel's rear pool, where he finds a conspiracy theorist who believes the resort is a simulation, and that one can only be freed by killing and cooking a mechanical pig that circuits the hotel. After doing this and navigating a digital maze, Polyblank finds himself back in the subway station, only to find the Director and his secretary have been kidnapped by the Editor. At his residence, the Editor challenges Polyblank to multiple games, promising to let the Director go if Polyblank wins. The Editor cheats and triumphs over Polyblank in the games, but Polyblank defeats the Editor by popping him with a pin after appealing to the Editor's ego, which physically inflates him. Polyblank frees the Director but turns him into a crocodile in the process, and is devoured. Inside the Director's intestines, Polyblank passes by the game's credits before taking more capsules, ending the game.

== Development ==
In an interview with Kotaku, developers Luis Hernandez and Jess Brouse stated that the game was originally intended to be a serious game with moments of comic relief thrown in, but that the team liked the comic aspects so much that they changed the entire game into a comedy. The game was originally created as a prototype in 2007, running on a standalone engine. The project was then transferred to Torque3D before being transferred to the Unity game engine, on which the final build was created. Most voices are performed by Hernandez; additional voice acting is provided by Zoë Quinn, Olivia Catroppa, James Stephanie Sterling and Chris Huth.

Alongside the Director's Cut on PC in 2017, a DLC was also released, titled Flavour Nexus, which includes a "lost chapter".

Sometime after the release of Flavour Nexus, Adult Swim games returned the publishing rights for Jazzpunk to Necrophone Games.

=== Influences ===
According to interviews with staff at Necrophone Games, Jazzpunk is a combination of the creators' favourite literature, movies, and music from the spy, cyberpunk, and film noir genres. The game makes many references to older movies, including Blade Runner, Alien, and Evil Dead II. In early 2014, the authors appeared in an interview conducted by Rock, Paper, Shotgun in which they stated that their idea for a short-form comedy game was partially influenced by the success of the original Portal. During this interview, the staff also mentioned that much of the game's writing was influenced by 1980's cyberpunk literature. The game's unique, cartoony art style was influenced by the work of Saul Bass, Josef Albers, and Gerd Arntz, while the simulation game and was music composed using audio production methods common in the 1950s and 1960s. The game's visual elements are also quite similar to Thirty Flights of Loving, whose developer Brendon Chung is thanked in the end credits.

== Reception ==
Reception

Aggregate scores
Aggregator	Score
GameRankings	76.09%
Metacritic	75/100

Review scores
Publication	Score
Destructoid	7/10
Giant Bomb	5/5
The Escapist	4/5
Hardcore Gamer	4/5

Jazzpunk received favourable reviews from critics on launch, earning a 9/10 from Eurogamer, a 7/10 from Destructoid, and a Metacritic score of 75/100.
