= Volgarr the Viking =

2013 video game

- Developer: Crazy Viking Studios
- Publishers: Adult Swim Games (PC); Crazy Viking Studios (XONE, PS4, PSV)
- Platforms: Windows, OS X, Linux, Xbox One, Dreamcast, PlayStation 4, PlayStation Vita, Wii U, Switch
- Release: Windows, OS X, Linux: WW: September 13, 2013; Xbox One: WW: October 31, 2014; Dreamcast: WW: October 15, 2015; PS4, Vita: NA: November 16, 2016; EU: November 7, 2017; Wii U: NA: October 12, 2017; EU: October 5, 2017; Switch: NA: October 5, 2017; EU: October 5, 2017
- Genre: Platform
- Mode: Single-player

Volgarr the Viking (stylized as Völgarr the Viking) is a platform game developed by Crazy Viking Studios. Inspired by side-scrolling platform games from the 1980s like Rastan and Ghosts 'n Goblins, the game is a modern interpretation of the genre, while retaining both the graphical style and the difficulty level of the earlier titles. After a successful Kickstarter campaign to crowd-fund the production of the game, Volgarr the Viking was published on Steam by Adult Swim Games in September 2013 and is supported on Windows, OS X and Linux-based personal computers. In October 2014, Crazy Viking Studios went on to publish the Xbox One port, and all subsequent ports were self-published too.

A sequel, Volgarr the Viking II, was released on August 6, 2024.

== Gameplay ==
In Volgarr the Viking, the player controls the titular character, who has been charged by Odin with a quest to defeat an evil dragon. Volgarr is armed with a sword, a spear and a wooden shield at the start. Along with hitting enemies at range, the spear can also be used to create temporary platforms. Treasure chests located throughout the level will contain power-ups that will grant Volgarr new abilities and, most importantly, enable him to take more damage. In his initial state, Volgarr can sustain a single unblocked hit at the cost of his shield, and a second hit will force the player to return to the last checkpoint, either the beginning of the level or the midpoint of the level. The player has an unlimited number of chances to complete the main levels.

Enemies drop coins and jewels when defeated, which the player can collect. If Volgarr is defeated, he will lose a portion of those coins. Only coins in hand when Volgarr completes a level are kept permanently. Levels can be replayed for additional coins and for faster completion times. By completing a level without losing a life, the player can obtain special key items that unlock additional bonus levels, which ultimately lead to the game's best-possible ending.

== Development ==
Crazy Viking Studios is based in Bothell, Washington and was founded by Kris Durrschmidt and Taron Millet, an artist and a programmer that left their former studio, Griptonite Games, after it was bought out by Glu Mobile, due to their distaste for the freemium mobile business model. Before leaving Griptonite they had held key roles in some of the studio's more well-known titles such as Shinobi 3D for the Nintendo 3DS, Assassin's Creed II: Discovery for the Nintendo DS, Spider-Man: Web of Shadows for the Nintendo DS, and The Legend of Spyro: The Eternal Night for the Game Boy Advance.

In July 2012, the studio launched a Kickstarter campaign to fund Volgarr the Viking, a game they based around "simple controls, high challenge, and meticulous design". The game reached its US$18,000 funding goal within one week, and concluded the campaign with just under $40,000. By then the game's development was already underway, with Taron as the game's designer and programmer, Kris as the artist and business manager, and audio contracted from Kochun Hu of Superhero Soundworks. The game was published on Steam just over a year later, on September 13, 2013, under the Adult Swim Games label. At the 2014 E3 convention, Microsoft said that Xbox One version of the game was to be released under its ID@Xbox program for independent developers; the game debuted on Xbox One on October 31 the same year.

== Reception ==
Reception

Aggregate scores
Aggregator	Score
GameRankings	PC: 78.33% (based on 6 reviews); XONE: 81.00% (based on 5 reviews)
Metacritic	PC: 76/100 (based on 9 reviews); XONE: 77 out of 100 (based on 5 reviews)

Review scores
Publication	Score
Destructoid	PC: 8/10
Eurogamer	XONE: 8/10
Digital Spy	XONE: 5/5

Volgarr the Viking received positive reviews from critics upon its release. On review-aggregating website Metacritic, the PC and Xbox One versions of the game have scores of 76 and 77 (out of a possible 100), respectively. On Metacritic's game-focused sister site, GameRankings, the games have scores of 78.33% and 81%, respectively.

In his review of the game for GameCritics.com, critic Daniel Weissenberger observed the game's similarity to the 1987 Taito video game Rastan, both in general mechanics and also level design, noting that Volgarr's first level was a re-creation of the first level of Rastan, including the skeletal remains of the earlier game's protagonist. Although Weissenberger did not give a numeric score for his review, he did call the game "an amazing accomplishment" and said that Crazy Viking had "taken the skeleton of a classic title and transformed it into the greatest game the 80s never produced". Dan Whitehead of Eurogamer described the game design as "more Ghosts N' Goblins or Rastan than Golden Axe, but there's also a heaping helping of the Bitmap Brothers classic Gods in the mix, along with Rafaelle Cecco's Stormlord".

Critics paid special attention to the game's high difficulty level. Scott Nichols of Digital Spy said "you will die repeatedly", but that the game was "never unfair". Nichols concluded that Volgarr "demands much from its players, testing their skills, determination and patience", but at the same time "it does so in such a balanced and beautifully designed way that makes the joy of playing every bit as high as the toll it demands". GameCritics' Weissenberger said "there are no unfair deaths nor unexpected enemy behavior". Tony Ponce of Destructoid said that Volgarr shouldn't be labeled "unfair" because it was "constructed in such a way that the greatest obstruction to victory is your own mediocre skills". However, Ponce was critical of what the game required to reach its best ending, saying "you're being asked to 1CC (one credit clear) the game, or close enough to it, all without ever getting touched once" and that "if I had to draw the line dividing what I'm willing to endure for the sake of enjoyment, that would be it".

== Sequel ==
A sequel, Volgarr the Viking II, was released on August 6, 2024, with Digital Eclipse serving as publisher.
