= Super House of Dead Ninjas =

2013 video game

- Developer: Megadev Games
- Publisher: Adult Swim Games (Note: Published by Bitmap Bureau from 4 December 2024, following the game's delisting by Adult Swim.)
- Platforms: Windows, browser
- Release: February 18, 2013
- Genre: Platform
- Mode: Single-player

Super House of Dead Ninjas is a platform game developed by Megadev and published by Adult Swim Games for Microsoft Windows in 2013. The game is a remake of House of Dead Ninjas, a freeware browser game available on the Adult Swim website.

== Gameplay ==
The player plays as a ninja and is tasked with descending a randomly generated 350-storey tower. Players have a limited time to descend all 350 storeys, with power-ups available to increase the time. The player character fills a "rage" meter by defeating enemies; when full, the player enters into a "rage" mode that makes them deal greater damage and become invulnerable until it runs out. The "rage" mode can be extended by defeating enemies with a full meter. The player can also unlock weapons and magic spells by meeting specific criteria during gameplay.

== Development ==
Super House of Dead Ninjas was developed by Megadev Games. Before they brought it to the publisher Adult Swim Games, it was known as Ninjinity. Multiple names were considered before this name was chosen, including Ninja Drop, which was used until shortly before launch. However, they changed this because they discovered another game with that name. They initially called it House of Dead Ninjas before adding Super to the beginning. The game was influenced by multiple other games, including Elevator Action and Ninja Gaiden.

When designing the game's style, artist Jon Davies limited himself to only using the color palette possible with Sega Genesis games.

== Reception ==
Super House of Dead Ninjas received mostly favorable reviews, resulting in an average score of 79/100 at Metacritic. Nikola Suprak of Hardcore Gamer described it as "bloody, violent, difficult and a sadistic kind of fun that makes it hard to put down (...) cramming every second of gameplay with as much blood, combat, and fun as possible, a game that is hard to pass up at its meagre asking price, and even harder to stop playing." In an also positive review, Destructoid's Fraser Brown opined "the instant challenge and frantic pace makes it perfect to just pick up and play for 15 minutes, while the tight controls and potentially limitless number of floors make it easy to pour hours into," but recommended to first try out the game's free version.
