= Soundodger =

2013 video game

- Developer: Studio Bean
- Publisher: Adult Swim Games (Until 2024) Studio Bean (Since 2024)
- Platforms: Browser game, Windows
- Release: Browser: WW: June 2013; Windows: WW: 11 October 2013
- Genre: Music
- Mode: Single-player

Soundodger is a 2013 video game developed by Studio Bean Games and published by Adult Swim Games as a browser game. A standalone version, Soundodger+, was released in October 2013. It received positive reviews upon release.

== Gameplay ==
The objective of Soundodger is to move a white circle to avoid projectiles that appear in time with music. If players are hit by projectiles, the music fast forwards and the player is temporarily invulnerable. Players can control the circle using the keyboard, touchpad or mouse. The expanded edition, Soundodger+, introduces two new modes: Auto-Gen Mode, which allows players to generate levels from an .mp3 file on their computer, and Editor Mode, where players can take a song and edit the type, frequency and spin of projectiles fired at the player.

== Development ==
Soundodger was developed by Studio Bean, the outlet of independent developer Michael Molinari. Molinari stated the design of the game was made to evoke the "sensation of moving through music". The game was showcased at IndieCade 2013. An expanded edition titled Soundodger+ was published on 11 October 2013, featuring additional tracks including those by Austin Wintory, Danny Baranowsky and Disasterpeace.

In 2024, following the acquisition of Adult Swim Games by Warner Bros. Discovery, Soundodger+ was delisted from digital storefronts, with Studio Bean writing that the game would be republished on Steam. As of June 29, 2024, Soundodger+ has been made available again for download, as Studio Bean is now the sole publisher of the game.

== Reception ==
Reception

Aggregate score
Aggregator	Score
Metacritic	78%

Review scores
Publication	Score
Hardcore Gamer	4/5
IGN	7.3/10
USgamer	4/5
PC World	4.5/5

According to review aggregator website Metacritic, Soundodger+ received "generally favourable" reviews from critics.
