= Techno Kitten Adventure =

2010 video game

- Publishers: Elite Gudz, 21st Street Games
- Producers: Brian Ferrara, Melissa Fassetta
- Designer: Brian Ferrara
- Programmer: Nick Kinkade
- Artists: Narek Gevorgian, Rolo Ledesma
- Platforms: Xbox Live Indie Games As of June 7: iOS, Android, Windows Phone
- Release: September 6, 2010
- Genre: Indie game Side-scrolling video game
- Mode: Single-player

Techno Kitten Adventure (TKA) is a side-scrolling video game developed by 21st Street Games and published by creative design studio Elite Gudz for the iOS App Store, Xbox Live Indie Games market, Android Market and Windows Phone market. In the game, players control a flying kitten that must avoid obstacles and distractions timed to hardcore music. The game was first released on Xbox Live Indie Games on September 6, 2010 by Nick Kinkade (xMonox). The game was originally developed using Microsoft XNA and is no longer available to purchase.

== Gameplay ==
Gameplay screenshot

In the game, the player navigates a kitten powered by a jetpack or by other methods with a single-button control. In the original Xbox Live Indie Games version the controls were limited to one button which players held to make the cat ascend, and released to make him descend. The object of the game is to accumulate a high score by avoiding black boxes and parameters on the top and bottom of the screen. The black lines change color in time with the intensity of the music, turning into rainbow-patterned lines. The other objects on the screen, including party yachts, unicorns, stars and hands, are intended to distract the player from their main objective of avoiding lines; flying through these objects will not affect the player's score. When the player does hit a black or rainbow line, the kitten character explodes in a spray of sparkles and emits a signature "Meow" sound effect.

Because of its distinctive hardcore music soundtrack, Techno Kitten Adventure draws on elements of rave, techno and electronic dance music culture. The game's main song is by Frisco, titled "Sea of Love (Hixxy Remix)".

On August 12, 2011, a free update was released for the Xbox Indie Games version of the game, which included a brand-new level called the Meat Pack. While maintaining the same one-button control, this level introduced the distraction of a pulsating screen, a complete horizontal inversion of all assets, and a rainbow-colored equalizer that blocks 1/3 of the viewing area. Testers of the Meat Pack have called it the most difficult level of Techno Kitten Adventure so far. It also introduced a new kitten for the Dream Pack, called the Byarf Kitteh (unlocked at 30,000 P).

The next year, on March 27, 2012, another free update was released for the Xbox Indie Games version of the game, which included another new level called the Popaganda Pack. The Popaganda Pack featured artwork from American pop artist Ron English. The new pack featured famous works by English, such as Grin and McSupersize turned into Kittehs for the game. The level introduced sequences such as blurring the screen almost entirely, flashing the hazards on and off, waving the screen, making the player slower, and covering the screen with inverted polka dots. The kittens introduced in this level are the Alien Kitteh (start-off), the Grin Kitteh (unlocked at 40,000 P), and the MC Kitteh (unlocked at 60,000 P). A kitten was also released for each one of the other packs, as well. For the Dream Pack, it was the Mermaid Kitteh (unlocked at 80,000 P), for the Meat Pack it was the Burger Kitteh (unlocked at 80,000 P), for the Lava Pack it was the Dragon Kitteh (unlocked at 80,000 P), and for the Cloud Pack it was the Death Kitteh (unlocked at 80,000 P).

On June 12, 2012, 21st Street Games announced its then-newest then-upcoming pack for Techno Kitten Adventure called the Nyan Cat Pack. The new pack, previewed in a trailer on the 21st Street Games Facebook, features Nyan Cat, Tac Nayn, and Gameboy Cat all as playable characters. The Nyan Cat Pack also features original artwork made specifically for the level as well as new gameplay elements such as the screen flipping upside down during play. The game originally contained a playable Nyan Cat as of July 15, 2011 but it was removed due to rights issues. These issues have since been resolved and Nyan Cat made his return to the game in the summer of 2012.

=== Track listing ===
Retrieved from official Facebook page.

- Dream Pack: Frisco - Sea of Love (Hixxy Remix)
- Cloud Pack: Re-Con & Demand - Like a Rainbow
- Lava Pack: Styles & Breeze - You're Shining
- Meat Pack: R-KADE - Taste of Heaven
- Popaganda Pack: R-KADE - Intergalactical High
- Nyan Cat Pack: R-KADE - My Rainbow

== Re-release ==
On May 5, 2011, Elite Gudz announced that a new version of the game would be released on June 7 for Xbox Live Indie Games, iOS, and Windows Phone, with an Android release sometime during Q2/Q3 2011. According to preview screenshots, the black and rainbow lines have been replaced with rotating and pulsating stars, adding more distraction for the player, possibly increasing the difficulty of the game. The new version has upgraded graphics and additional playable cat characters.

Screenshots released prior to the game's June 7 launch date include a new version of the original scene, a Heaven level with a chubby pink cupid cat, and a Center of the Earth level featuring a cat with bat wings. Gameplay on iPod Touch, iPhone, and iPad is split between pressing the screen to rise (releasing to descend) and a "gyro" mode, where tilting the device toward or away from the user descends and ascends the "kitteh", respectively.

On 23 August 2011, Techno Kitten Adventure for Facebook was released. The Games.com blog gave the game a positive review, saying " If you were a fan of Robot Unicorn Attack when it hit Facebook recently, then we'd say Techno Kitten Adventure is right up your alley."

== Additional content ==
On December 8 of 2011, 21st Street games released Kitteh Parteh on the iOS App Store. Kitteh Parteh is a companion app to Techno Kitten Adventure, which has new content from Techno Kitten for fans, including a full-length comic, a jukebox that plays music featured in the game and Techno Kitten Adventure backgrounds.

== Media ==
Since its initial release, Techno Kitten Adventure has been one of the top downloaded and top rated games on the Xbox Live Indie Games market. On May 14, after posting a Techno Kitten Adventure promotional video on their blog, G4TV tweeted that "Techno Kitten Adventure will be the next runaway hit. Mark our words." Techno Kitten Adventure was also featured on G4TV's "Attack of the Show." In the segment, a Techno Kitten statue is presented by Kevin Pereira, and soon accidentally broken by Candace Bailey.

Although the game was created and developed in America, due to the international accessibility of Xbox Live Indie Games, Techno Kitten Adventure is covered by gaming outlets in Germany and the UK.

=== Social media ===
In February 2011, the Twitter account @ICanHasTechno was created. The account interacts with fans and tweets in catspeak, similar to the grammatical patterns and purposeful misspellings originally developed on 4Chan and popularized by images found on I Can Has Cheezburger. The account was later used to leak images of the redesigned game, art pieces based on the game, and other information before it was officially announced to the media.

== Notable appearances ==
=== Good Day LA ===
Techno Kitten and his Kitten Dancers made an appearance on Good Day LA on June 7, 2011. A special Techno Kitten level was created using Techno Kitten's body and Good Day LA host Steve Edwards' head. In the next segment, weather and lifestyle anchor Jillian Reynolds could be heard off camera saying "Bring back the techno kittens!"

Techno Kitten and his Kitten Dancers also made an appearance outside of E3 on June 7, 2011. Techno Kitten and 10 Kitten Dancers hosted a dance party outside the Los Angeles Convention Center. Passers by received Techno Kitten stickers and an opportunity to try out the game on iPad. While watching the Kitten Dancers outside E3, a cameraman was quoted as saying "Techno Kitten Adventure is now my most wanted game." However, when GameTrailers rep Ashly Burch attempted to interview Brian Ferrara about the usage of "booth babes" to promote the game, he walked out of the interview and demanded that it not be aired.

=== San Diego Comic-Con 2011 ===
A con-exclusive Techno Kitten Adventure comic book was given away to select fans at San Diego Comic-Con. Their presence was noted by G4's Attack of the Show as they displayed one of the "rocket cats" that were sold at the convention.

== See also ==
- Nyan Cat
