= Death's Gambit =

2018 video game

- Developer: White Rabbit
- Publisher: Adult Swim Games (Note: Afterlife version published by Serenity Forge.)
- Designer: Jean Canellas
- Programmer: Jean Canellas
- Artist: Alex Kubodera
- Platforms: Microsoft Windows; PlayStation 4 Afterlife; Microsoft Windows; Nintendo Switch; PlayStation 4 Xbox One
- Release: 14 August 2018; Afterlife; Microsoft Windows, Nintendo Switch; 30 September 2021; PlayStation 4; 30 November 2021; Xbox One; 26 May 2022
- Genres: Action role-playing, Metroidvania

Death's Gambit is a side-scrolling action role-playing game developed by White Rabbit and published by Adult Swim Games. It was released for Microsoft Windows and PlayStation 4 in August 2018. An expanded edition of the game titled Death’s Gambit: Afterlife released in September 2021 for Microsoft Windows and Nintendo Switch, in November 2021 for PlayStation 4 and in May 2022 for Xbox One.

== Gameplay ==
Death's Gambit is a side-scrolling action role-playing game featuring Soulslike and Metroidvania elements. The game is presented from a 2D perspective with a pixel art aesthetic.

== Development and release ==
Death's Gambit was developed by independent studio White Rabbit. The primary inspiration for the gameplay of Death's Gambit was Metroidvania games. The development team also wanted to integrate systems from games and series they enjoyed playing such as Castlevania, Dark Souls, and Shadow of the Colossus. Castlevania games were also an influence for game's art direction, as well as Superbrothers: Sword & Sworcery EP.

The game was published by Adult Swim Games and was released for Windows and PlayStation 4 on 14 August 2018.

=== Death's Gambit: Afterlife ===
An expanded and revised edition of the game titled Death's Gambit: Afterlife was released on 30 September 2021 for Microsoft Windows, Nintendo Switch, and on 30 November 2021 for PlayStation 4, with a version for Xbox One currently in development. Afterlife featured new content including 10 new levels, over 30 weapons, 5 new bosses, and mechanical overhauls. White Rabbit released the expansion for free to new users upon receiving community feedback.

== Reception ==
Death's Gambit

Aggregate score
Aggregator	Score
Metacritic	PC: 71/100; PS4: 72/100

Review scores
Publication	Score
GameSpot	6/10
IGN	6.7/10
PC Gamer (UK)	67/100

Death's Gambit: Afterlife

Aggregate score
Aggregator	Score
Metacritic	PC: 81/100; NS: 78/100

Death's Gambit received "mixed or average" reviews, according to review aggregator Metacritic.

GameSpot's James Swinbanks praised the exploration and the story, but criticized the game's combat as being clunky. Writing for PC Gamer, Samuel Horti enjoyed the game's story, but disliked the stamina system. In a mixed review, Mike Epstein at IGN wrote, "Death’s Gambit is a very blunt attempt to fuse two beloved games, Dark Souls and Castlevania: Symphony of the Night, into one challenging 2D action-platformer. Developer White Rabbit shows a strong understanding of what made each of them great but glosses over fundamentals that all great games need, such as responsive controls and an understandable game world, and falls short of its promise."

Death's Gambit: Afterlife received greater critical acclaim than the original game, with critics citing that the game made a number of quality additions and improvements to the base game while retaining its unique qualities.
