= Kingsway (video game) =

2017 fantasy role-playing video game

- Steam storefront header
- Publishers: Adult Swim Games (2017-2024); Andrew Morrish (2024-present)
- Designer: Andrew Morrish
- Composer: Landon Podbielski
- Platform: Windows
- Release: WW: 18 July 2017
- Genre: Role-playing
- Mode: Single player

Kingsway is a fantasy role-playing video game developed and published by Andrew Morrish. (Note: Originally published by Adult Swim Games, Warner Bros. transferred publishing rights to Morrish in 2024.)

== Gameplay ==
Kingsway is a fantasy role-playing video game presented through the interface of a 1990s operating system, similar to Windows 95. The role-playing game elements are represented through different facets of the operating system interface. For example, the inventory, world map, and character stats appear in separate window elements. Enemies are displayed in popup windows that move about the screen. Progress bars are used to display the player and enemy turn speeds. Quests are received via email and when the player is low on health or mana an error message will show.

== Development and release ==
Kingsway was developed by Andrew Morrish and published by Adult Swim Games. Morrish and Adult Swim had collaborated previously on his shooter game Super Puzzle Platformer (2013). Morrish was influenced by old computer role-playing games and operating systems. He also noted Lucas Pope's dystopian puzzle video game Papers, Please (2013) as a particular inspiration for his first prototype of Kingsway. In Papers, Please, players would receive more documents and instructions as the game progressed. This created clutter that the player would have to organise efficiently to succeed. Morrish applied this philosophy of creating clutter by making the player have to manage multiple window elements, popups, files and folders. Finding the most intuitive correspondences between the role-playing game mechanics and operating system mechanics was the most challenging aspect of designing Kingsway for Morrish. Due to the familiarity player had with using an operating system interface, Morrish found that players did not require much guidance to play the game.

Kingsway was playable at the Electronic Entertainment Expo 2017. The game was released for Windows on 18 July 2017.

== Reception ==
Kingsway was well received by professional critics. Both aggregators Metacritic and GameRankings gave it 79 and 80 out of 100 respectively. It was nominated for "Game, Original Role Playing" at the National Academy of Video Game Trade Reviewers Awards.

Ray Porreca of Destructoid praised the game's gameplay.

Alice O'Connor of Rock, Paper, Shotgun compared Kingsway to the '90s desktop versions of Indiana Jones and Star Wars.

== Further reading and listening ==
- Humphries, Matthew (8 March 2017). "Kingsway is an RPG Set Inside an Operating System". PC Magazine.
- Francis, Bryant (21 July 2017). "Chat with the developer of RPG 'operating system' Kingsway at 3PM EDT". Gamasutra.
- Francis, Bryant (21 July 2017). "Kingsway's developer explains how to make the most out of your user interface". Gamasutra. Archived from the original on 22 July 2017.
