= Girls Like Robots =

2012 video game

- Developer(s): Popcannibal
- Publisher(s): Adult Swim, Popcannibal, Unity Japan
- Platform(s): Microsoft Windows; OS X; Linux; Wii U; iOS
- Release: iOS; October 11, 2012; Steam; February 14, 2014; Wii U: JP: July 29, 2015; NA: November 12, 2015
- Genre(s): Puzzle

Girls Like Robots is a game developed by American studio Popcannibal for multiple platforms and published initially on iOS by Adult Swim on October 11, 2012. It is a puzzle game about seating arrangements.

== Critical reception ==
The iOS version has a Metacritic score of 88% based on 10 critic reviews.
