= Robot Unicorn Attack =

2010 video game

- Developer: Spiritonin Media Games
- Publisher: Adult Swim Games
- Platforms: Adobe Flash, iOS, Android
- Release: NA: February 4, 2010
- Genre: Endless runner
- Mode: Single player

Robot Unicorn Attack is an endless running video game released by Spritonin Media Games on February 4, 2010. In the first week after its release, the game garnered one million plays. Erasure's song "Always" was a main part of the original game. Following Robot Unicorn Attack, Adult Swim released three follow-ups, titled Heavy Metal, Christmas Edition, and Evolution. As part of the Robot Unicorn Attack series, a sequel was developed and released by PikPok for iOS and Android on April 25, 2013, and July 12, 2013, respectively. Robot Unicorn Attack Forever, a third game rendered in full 3D, was released on April 27, 2017 for iOS.

== Gameplay ==
The Robot Unicorn approaching a star

Robot Unicorn Attack is a side scrolling platform game with gameplay that speeds up as it progresses. The player controls a robotic unicorn and aims to prolong gameplay without falling off the stage, crashing into the edges of platforms, or colliding into crystal stars without dashing into them. Jumps and dashes can be chained together while the unicorn is airborne. Points are earned during playtime, by collecting pixies, and by destroying crystal stars by dashing through them. Consecutive collection of pixies or crystal stars adds progressively higher incremental scores to the total. Upon missing a pixie or star, the increment resets. The player has three lives (referred to as "wishes"), and the sum of the scores from each life counts for the player's final score.

== Other versions ==
=== Heavy Metal ===
In October 2010, Adult Swim Games released Robot Unicorn Attack: Heavy Metal, an alternate version of the game featuring different visuals and music, for iPhone. It was later published to Adultswim.com, as well, on November 19, 2010. The game features the song "Battlefield" from German power metal band Blind Guardian.

The game's presentation is influenced by depictions of Hell as well as glam metal. It received a better score on their website than the original.

In January 2011, Robot Unicorn Attack: Heavy Metal was made available on Facebook alongside its original counterpart as a single application.

=== Christmas Edition ===
On November 23, 2010, Adult Swim released a Christmas-themed version of Robot Unicorn Attack entitled Robot Unicorn Attack: Christmas Edition. The game features "Christmas Time (Don't Let the Bells End)" by The Darkness. Robot Unicorn Attack: Christmas Edition was released on Adultswim.com in November 2011.

=== Evolution ===
Robot Unicorn Attack: Evolution has identical gameplay to the original, but after three stars are broken in a row (four in a row in the Facebook version), the Robot Unicorn evolves into other robotic creatures. There are also multiple fairies per platform. In the Facebook version, the player must keep breaking stars in order to transform into the next animal; missing a star will cause the animal to revert back to the unicorn.

=== Retro Unicorn Attack ===
Retro Unicorn Attack, a version of the game styled after popular video games in the 8-bit era, was released in 2013.

== Sequels ==
=== Robot Unicorn Attack 2 ===
A sequel titled Robot Unicorn Attack 2 was developed by PikPok and released on iOS on April 25, 2013, and Android on July 12, 2013. It has similar core gameplay to the original, but expands upon it in several ways, such as adding boosts that affect gameplay. For example, the "Collection Vacuum" boost pulls fairies and teardrops towards the player. It also introduces new enemies, such as giant golems called Dash Giants that are destroyed by dashing into them, as well as character customization and the ability to fly by equipping wings. The player can collect teardrops to customize their character and complete missions to unlock new content and abilities. Additionally, the player can join either Team Rainbow or Team Inferno and compete in daily missions to win teardrops by dashing through the most stars. The game also has updated visuals, with the unicorn player and backgrounds having more detail. Post-launch updates introduced Egyptian and medieval-themed unicorns as well as the new threat of Solar Geysers. The "Lava World" was also added, available for purchase with real-world currency.

This is the first Robot Unicorn Attack to include in-game purchases; the player can buy credits to upgrade the unicorn and gain additional sound-packs. Erasure's song "Always" – which was a main part of the original game – is not in the base game and must be purchased separately for $0.99.

"I will never be able to separate Always from Robot Unicorn Attack", wrote Kieron Gillen in 2010. "I can't even imagine wanting to do such a thing. It'd be like decapitating the Mona Lisa. It merges with the sparkles of sound effects and the explosions of light and makes it complete." The song is not included with the base game due to copyright issues. Since Adult Swim wanted the game to be free-to-play, the song was made into an in-game purchase.

Other songs by bands such as Blind Guardian, Slade, Limahl, and Corey Hart are also available for purchase.

=== Robot Unicorn Attack 3: Forever ===
A third game titled Robot Unicorn Attack 3 Forever was released by Adult Swim Games on iOS and Android on April 27, 2017.

Like Robot Unicorn Attack 2, Forever features in-game purchases; the player can buy different amounts of Soul Crystals and a Rainbow Pack. These purchases range from $1.99 to $99.99 per item.

== Critical reception ==
Reception

Aggregate score
Aggregator	Score
Metacritic	73/100 (Heavy Metal Edition) 67/100

Review score
Publication	Score
TouchArcade	4.5/5

Ivan Williams of 1UP.com stated that, "Whether it's the song constantly on a loop or the simple desire to get a better score than the millions of other gamers playing, I challenge anyone to play Robot Unicorn Attack and not have that game pop into your head every now and then."

In reviews of the major flash games of 2010, Eurogamer writer Kieron Gillen said, "Like a comet made of gold, glitter and Lady Gaga's eyelashes, Robot Unicorn Attack circled the Earth and filled the firmament with its irresistible radiance for the whole of 2010. It changed lives. It challenged sexualities. It involves pressing two buttons. It is undoubtedly the greatest game of all time that features a Robot Unicorn unless you're a metalhead who digs its sequel."

Scott Sharkey of UGO Networks said that while "the aesthetic is a good gag for a few minutes", the important point of Robot Unicorn Attack is that "the game itself is addictive enough to last much, much longer. At least, until someone catches you playing and ribs you about it for the next week or so."

Neon Kelly, Previews Editor of VideoGamer.com, concluded after playing that "Somehow the whole thing ends up being extremely addictive - despite the fact that the game's tongue is so firmly wedged in its cheek that it's in danger of giving itself permanent facial damage. If you've not yet done so, I heartily urge you to go try it."

Toby Green of The Independent wrote in a short review that the game was "Great fun", giving it four out of five stars.

In a review of the iPhone version of the game, CNN writer Topher Kohan concluded, "Easy-to-use controls, great soundtrack, the ability to turn the sound off and get useful feedback via vibrate and fun in-game tidbits. This feels like a game you'll put on your phone, then pull out to play again and again."

In a twin review for the Australian Broadcasting Corporation by reviewers Stephanie Bendixsen ("Hex") and Steven O'Donnell ("Bajo"), Hex finished by saying, "This game is utterly riDONKulous, so I'm giving it the utterly ridonkulous score of 8971. I can't wait to press Z to chase my dreams again", to which reviewer Bajo responded, "I'm not sure how to score it after that."

== See also ==
- Nyan Cat, an Internet meme similar to the game
