= Newton Game Dynamics =

Physics engine

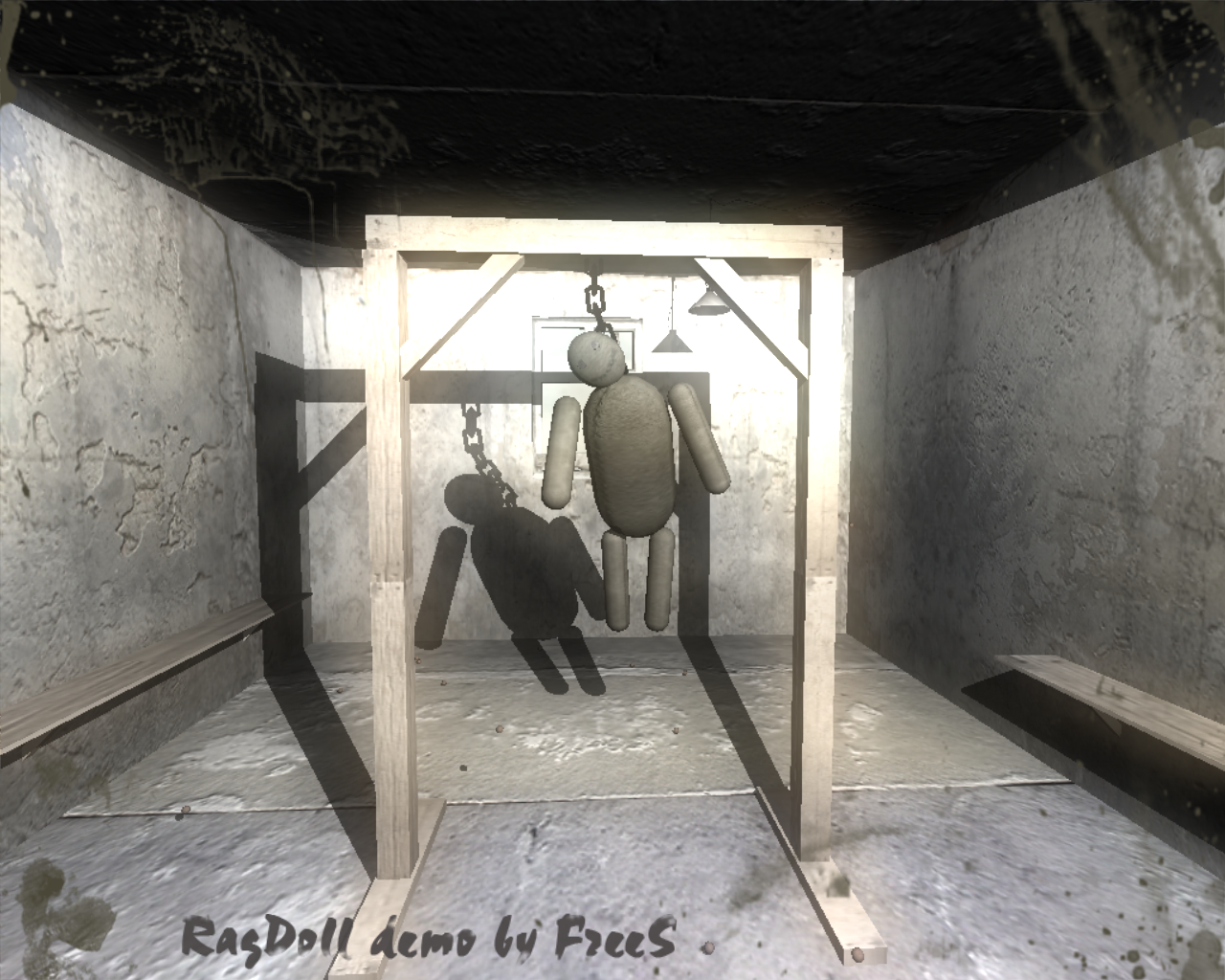
- Ragdoll demonstration. This demo uses Newton Game Dynamics, the free OGRE graphics engine, and the free texture library DevIL.
- Original authors: Julio Jerez & Alain Suero
- Stable release: 4.02 / December 30, 2022; 3 years ago
- Written in: C++
- Operating system: Windows, Linux, macOS, iOS
- Type: Middleware
- License: zlib License
- Website: Newton Game Dynamics Homepage (archived)

Newton Game Dynamics is an open-source physics engine for realistically simulating rigid bodies in games and other real-time applications. Its solver is deterministic and not based on traditional LCP or iterative methods.

Newton Game Dynamics is actively developed by Julio Jerez. Currently a new version which will take advantage of multi-core CPUs and GPUs is being developed.

== Games that used Newton ==
This is a select list of games using Newton Game Dynamics.

- Amnesia: Rebirth
- Amnesia: A Machine for Pigs
- Amnesia: The Dark Descent
- Amnesia: The Bunker
- b4n92uid theBall
- City Bus Simulator
- Future Pinball – a 3D pinball editing and gaming application
- Mount & Blade
- Nicktoons Winners Cup Racing
- Overclocked: A History of Violence
- Penumbra: Overture
- Penumbra: Black Plague
- Penumbra: Requiem
- Vivisector: Beast Within
- SOMA
- Steam Brigade
- SALVATIONLAND

== Engines which incorporated Newton ==
A list of game engines using Newton Game Dynamics:

- HPL Engine 1, 2, and 3
- Leadwerks

== See also ==
- Open Dynamics Engine (ODE)
- Project Chrono
