= Penumbra (disambiguation) =

The penumbra is the part of a shadow where the light source is only partially blocked.

Penumbra may also refer to:

== Entertainment ==
- Penumbra (band), a French gothic metal band
- "Penumbra", a song by John Ireland
- "Penumbra", a song by Tortoise
- "Penumbra" (Star Trek: Deep Space Nine), a 1999 episode of Star Trek: Deep Space Nine
- Penumbra (TV series), Mexican telenovela
- Penumbra (World of Darkness), a region in the World of Darkness line of role-playing games
- Penumbra, a series of video games by Frictional Games consisting of:
  - Penumbra: Overture
  - Penumbra: Black Plague
  - Penumbra: Requiem

== Companies ==
- Penumbra Theatre Company, an African American theatre in Saint Paul, Minnesota
- Penumbra (medical company), in Alameda, California

== Other uses ==
- Penumbra (law), a metaphor for rights implied in the United States Constitution
- Penumbra (medicine), surviving tissue at the margin of an ischemic event (such as a stroke) which is in danger of hypoxia and subsequent cell death
- Penumbra (Sun), the ring-shaped semi-bright region of a sunspot that surrounds the darker umbra
- Penumbral lunar eclipse, an eclipse that occurs when the Moon passes through the Earth's penumbra

== See also ==
- Umbra (disambiguation)
