= Penumbra: Necrologue =

- Developer: CounterCurrent Games
- Engine: HPL Engine 2
- Platforms: Microsoft Windows, Linux, macOS
- Release: 31 October 2014
- Genre: Survival Horror
- Mode: Single-player

Penumbra: Necrologue is a third-party total conversion modification released for Amnesia: The Dark Descent in 2014 by CounterCurrent Games. It was in development for 2 years. It continues the storyline after the events of Penumbra: Requiem, and like its predecessors, heavily focuses on exploration and survival.

On 31 October 2015, the add-on Penumbra: Twilight of the Archaic was released, described by the makers as a prequel/spin-off to Necrologue.

== Gameplay ==
The gameplay is identical to that of the Penumbra series. The game features puzzles and several monsters that cannot be defeated. Players must use their wits and hide or run away to survive. Almost every in-game object can be interacted with, such as doors, drawers, boxes, bricks, etc.

=== Synopsis ===
Join Philip in the last part of his journey as he tries to find the answers to everything he witnessed in the Archaic Shelter while trying to stay alive from the many horrors that await him deep below the ice. Will he finally be able to escape the nightmare, and see daylight again?

=== Setting ===
Necrologue takes place in 2001 right after the events of Penumbra: Requiem, in an underground facility called The Shelter. The Shelter is located in a remote location in Greenland.

== Music ==
Penumbra: Necrologue Original Soundtrack

Soundtrack album by Various Artists
- Released: 4 November 2014
- Recorded: 2013–2014
- Genre: Soundtrack
- Length: 45:41
- Label: Open-source

The soundtrack of Penumbra: Necrologue was composed by Julien Hauspie, ScoreStorm, Drex Wiln, Tiero, and Valentin Parhomenko. The songs are inspired on the previous work of Frictional Games composer Mikko Tarmia as to keep the atmosphere as close to the original as possible.

The "Penumbra: Necrologue Original Soundtrack" was released as a free download on 4 November 2014 on the Mod DB page. It does not include all of the tracks of Necrologue, but 23 hand-picked remastered and remixed tracks.

1. Main Theme	13. Hunter Danger
2. Go Ahead, Monkey	14. Hunter Chase
3. Eclips	15. End Of Jayla
4. Collector	16. Hunter Danger (alt.)
5. Red Again	17. Hunter Chase (alt.)
6. Cryochambers	18. Complex
7. Laboratory	19. If Fate Frowns...
8. Accommodations	20. The Mines
9. Archives	21. The Tuurngait Tomb
10. Lights On	22. Tower Is Collapsing
11. At Heart	23. Credits
12. Unfinished Complex	

== Reception ==
Penumbra: Necrologue was very well received, with mostly positive reviews. One of the main downsides were game-breaking bugs upon release. These bugs have been fixed however, in the latest 1.2 patch.

Several gaming websites praised the game for its soundtrack and atmosphere, saying it fits right in with the official Penumbra trilogy.

The mod also won the Mod DB: Mod of The Year "Editors' Choice" 2014: "Best Singleplayer" award.

The Steam Greenlight campaign for Necrologue started on 8 January 2015 and was successfully greenlit on 23 January 2015.
