= Jubert =

Jubert is a surname. Notable people with the surname include:

- Luis Jubert Salieti (1900–1936), Spanish military commander
- Tom Jubert (born 1985), British video game writer and narrative designer
