= Umber (disambiguation) =

Umber is a brown or reddish-brown earth pigment.

Umber may also refer to:

- Umber Island, Antarctica
- Umber (album), 1989 debut album of the American post-hardcore band Bitch Magnet
- Umber, a Northern House in A Song of Ice and Fire and its adaptations

== See also ==
- Hamerkop, a bird species also known as the umber bird or tufted umber
- Mottled umber, a moth species
- Umbers, a surname
- Umbar, a land in J. R. R. Tolkien's fantasy Middle-earth
- Umbra (disambiguation)
