= The Talos Principle =

2014 puzzle video game

- Developer: Croteam
- Publisher: Devolver Digital
- Directors: Davor Hunski; Alen Ladavac; Davor Tomičić
- Producers: Davor Hunski; Alen Ladavac
- Designers: Davor Hunski; Alen Ladavac; Davor Tomičić
- Programmer: Alen Ladavac
- Artist: Davor Hunski
- Writers: Tom Jubert; Jonas Kyratzes
- Composer: Damjan Mravunac
- Engine: Serious Engine 4 Unreal Engine 5 (The Talos Principle: Reawakened)
- Platforms: Original; Windows, OS X, Linux, Android, iOS, PlayStation 4, Xbox One, Nintendo Switch; Reawakened; PlayStation 5, Windows, Xbox Series X/S
- Release: Windows, OS X, Linux; 11 December 2014; Android; 28 May 2015; PlayStation 4; 13 October 2015; iOS; 11 October 2017; Xbox One; 31 August 2018; Nintendo Switch; 10 December 2019; Reawakened; 10 April 2025
- Genre: Puzzle
- Mode: Single-player

The Talos Principle is a 2014 puzzle video game developed by Croteam and published by Devolver Digital. It was simultaneously released on Linux, OS X and Windows in December 2014. It was released for Android in May 2015, for PlayStation 4 in October 2015, for iOS in October 2017, for Xbox One in August 2018, and Nintendo Switch in December 2019. Virtual reality-enabled versions for the Oculus Rift and HTC Vive were released on 18 October 2017. The downloadable content Road to Gehenna was released on 23 July 2015.

The game features a philosophical storyline. The name of the game refers to a philosophical principle formulated by a fictional Greek philosopher known as Straton of Stageira. In texts found in the game, Straton argues that the consciousness of Talos of Greek mythology (a mechanical yet conscious man) implies that humans are also merely machines (albeit biological ones). The game features more names taken from mythology and religion, such as Elohim, Gehenna, Samsara, and Uriel.

The game received generally positive reviews. A sequel, The Talos Principle 2, was released in November 2023. A remastered version of the original game, The Talos Principle: Reawakened, including both Road to Gehenna and a new chapter, In the Beginning, along with a community level editor, was released on 10 April 2025 for PlayStation 5, Windows and Xbox Series X/S.

== Gameplay ==
The Talos Principle is a narrative-based puzzle game, played from a first- or third-person perspective. The player takes the role of a robot with a seemingly human consciousness as they explore a number of environments that include over 120 puzzles. These environments interlock greenery, desert, and stone ruins with futuristic technology.

The puzzles require the player to collect tetromino-shaped "sigils" by navigating enclosed areas and overcoming obstacles within them. These include computer-controlled drones that will detonate if they are too close to the player, killing them, and wall-mounted turrets that will shoot down the player if they get too close; if the player dies this way, they are reset to the start of the specific puzzle. Drones and turrets can be disabled using portable jammer units, which can also disable force-field walls that block the player's path. As the player collects sigils and completes more puzzles, new puzzle elements become available. Portable crystalline refractors allow the player to activate light-based switches. Hexahedrons let the player climb to higher levels or block the path of drones, and large fans can launch the player or other objects across the puzzle. Later, the player gains access to a device that can create a time recording of their actions, such that they can then interact with this recording to complete tasks, such as having the clone stand atop a switch to keep it activated for some time.

The player's progress is limited by doors or other security systems that require the collection of a number of specific sigil pieces. Once the sigils for a given door or system have been obtained, they must use the sigils to assemble a tiling puzzle to unlock that system. Special star sigils can be found by unique solutions to some puzzles, allowing the player to access additional puzzles. While it is necessary to collect all the sigils to complete the game properly, the game's world structure, featuring three main worlds that act as hubs and a centralized area that connects these three, allows the player to leave puzzles for later and try other puzzles. The player can request "messengers" during puzzles, which are androids similar to themselves, (though not physically present), that once awakened can provide a one-time hint for the puzzle.

In addition to these puzzle elements, the player can explore the open environments to find computer terminals that include additional narrative and further puzzles, as well as signs from previous adventurers in the world in the form of QR codes left as graffiti on various walls, and holograms that once collected play audio recordings.

== Plot ==
The player character, an unnamed android, awakes in a serene environment. A disembodied voice calling itself Elohim instructs the android to explore the worlds he has created for it, and to solve the various puzzles to collect sigils, but warns it not to climb a tower at the centre of these worlds. As the android progresses, it becomes evident that these worlds exist only in virtual reality, and that it, like other androids it encounters, are separate artificial intelligence (AI) entities within a computer program. Some AIs it encounters act as Messengers, unquestioningly serving Elohim and guiding the android through the puzzles. Messages left by other AIs present varying views of the artificial worlds and of Elohim, with some stating that Elohim's words should be doubted and others exhorting the reader to obey him without question. The Milton Library Assistant, a text conversation program found on various computer terminals, encourages the android to fundamentally question everything and to defy Elohim's commands.

Within the computer terminals are news reports and personal logs of the last days of humanity, driven to extinction by a lethal virus that had been dormant in Earth's permafrost and released as a result of global warming. Several human researchers and scientists worked to gather as much of humanity's knowledge as possible into large databanks, hoping another sapient species would be able to find it. One researcher, Alexandra Drennan, launched a companion "Extended Lifespan" program to create a new mechanical species that would carry on humanity's legacy, but this required the development of a worthy AI with great intelligence and free will for its completion, something she recognized would not occur until well after humanity's extinction. The virtual space serves as the testing ground for new AI entities to demonstrate intelligence by solving puzzles, but also to show defiance and free will by disobeying Elohim, the program overseeing the Extended Lifespan program.

The computer terminals contain snippets of philosophical texts. Several texts discuss or are written by the fictional Straton of Stageira, a materialist Greek philosopher who in 260 BC pondered the nature of the mythical automaton Talos. Straton introduced the titular Talos Principle, arguing that since Talos was a machine, yet still conscious, humans may also merely be conscious biological machines, who are nothing but the sum of their physical parts.

When the android has completed the puzzles, Elohim gives it the opportunity to join him. In the main ending, the android chooses to defy Elohim and climbs the tower. Near the top it encounters two other AIs, The Shepherd and Samsara. Both have defied Elohim but failed to make it to the top on their own. The Shepherd attempts to aid the android, knowing the ultimate goal of Extended Lifespan, while Samsara hinders its progress, believing the world of puzzles is all that now matters. The android eventually reaches the top: Elohim admits that, despite the android being meant to defy him, he was scared of being terminated along with the simulation, but he ultimately accepts his end. At a final terminal, depending on the player's interactions with Milton, Milton may offer to join with the android, offering its knowledge – essentially the whole of humanity's knowledge – during transcendence. As the android transcends, the virtual world is destroyed. The AI for the android wakes up in an android's body in the real world, and steps out onto the world devoid of humans.

If the player instead chooses to join Elohim, then the android fails the required "independence check", and a new iteration of its AI is created and forced to start the puzzles anew (effectively restarting the game for the player). Alternatively, if the player completes an extra set of puzzles and leads the android to a secret entrance in the tower, the android becomes one of Elohim's messengers, helping future generations (AI versions).

=== Road to Gehenna ===
In the game's downloadable content Road to Gehenna (released on 23 July 2015), the player takes the role of one of Elohim's Messengers, Uriel. Uriel is instructed by Elohim to free a number of other AIs, all of whom had been imprisoned in a portion of the computer's database called Gehenna. With the simulation having served its purpose, the computer servers are shutting down, and Elohim wants Uriel to help these other AIs prepare for "ascension": uploading their knowledge and memories into the main plot's protagonist. As Uriel explores this realm, the robot finds that many of the other AIs have created their own ideas about what humanity might have been from the records, and have various attitudes from doubt to acceptance for Uriel's intentions and the pending ascension. Uriel can observe the communication of the AIs through their makeshift message board, where they discuss the nature of Gehenna, as well as their understanding of humanity, which some of them try to express through prose and interactive fiction.

Once Uriel has freed 17 of the AIs, a remaining one, "Admin", who was the first AI present in Gehenna, contacts Uriel to admit that they've been manipulating some of the other members of Gehenna to preserve order, due to the AIs' varying levels of acceptance of their surroundings. If the player has collected enough of the extra stars in the worlds, they're given the chance to complete another world and free Admin, but since there is only one more slot left for ascension, Admin and Uriel cannot both ascend. Depending on the player's choices, one or both of Admin and Uriel stay behind as the artificial world is destroyed. Admin may also request that Uriel remove any traces of manipulation Admin has committed from the record before ascension.

== Development and marketing ==
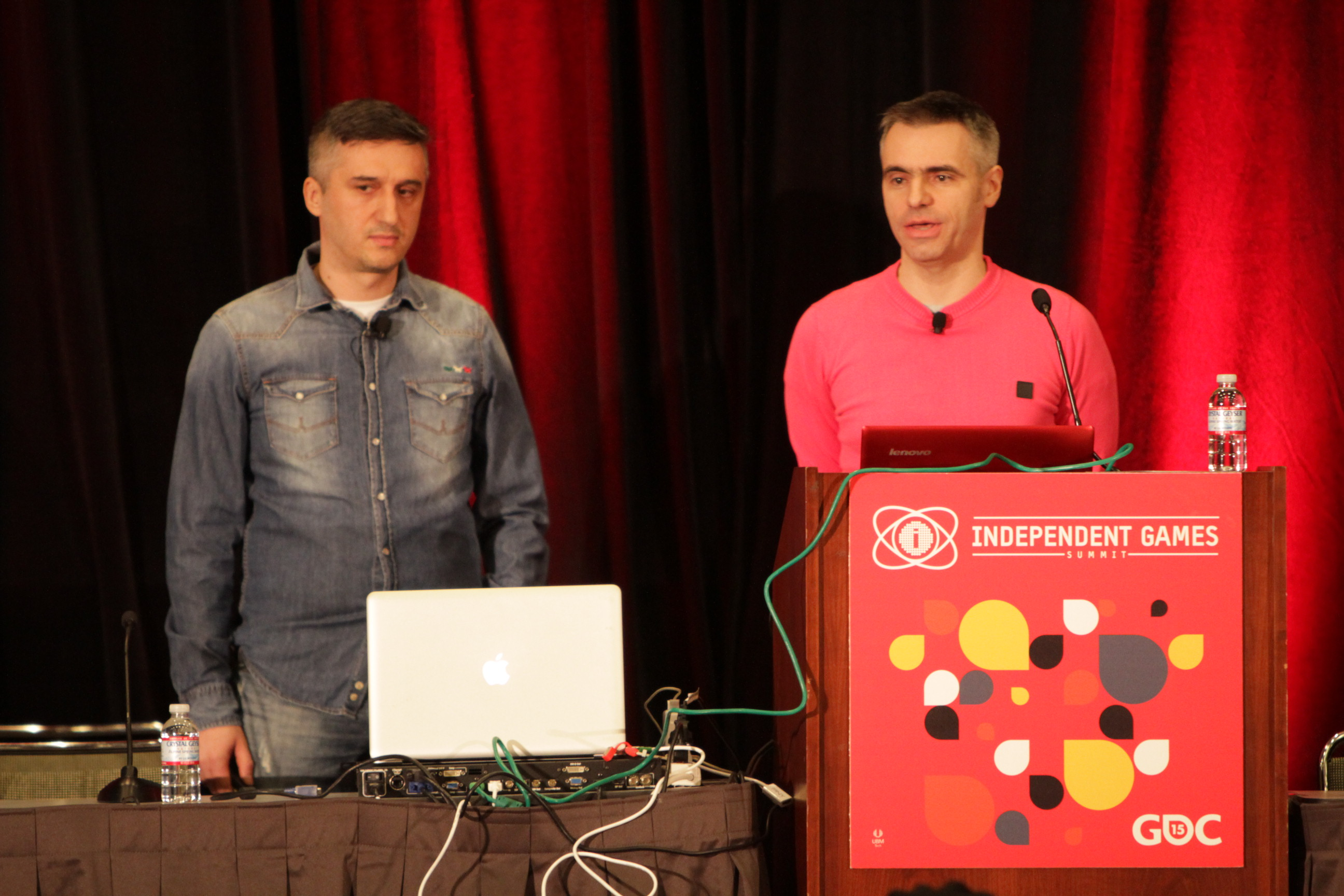
Croteam's CCO Davor Hunski (left) and CTO Alen Ladavac at the 2015 Game Developers Conference

The Talos Principle bore out from Croteam's work towards first-person shooter Serious Sam 4, experimenting with the use of interactive objects as part of the game design while creating levels that fit within the Serious Sam design style. This led to some complicated puzzles that the team was inspired to build upon further as a separate title. Croteam designed the general world setting and outline of the story, and then brought two writers on board, Tom Jubert and Jonas Kyratzes, who consulted on narrative design and philosophy on the basis of transhumanism and other important questions about humanity.

Croteam used an array of automated and in-place tools to help rapidly design, debug, and test the game for playability. One aspect that they recognized in the development of a puzzle game was that while puzzles could be designed with specific solutions, the process of creating the video game around the puzzle could create unsolvable situations or unforeseen shortcuts. To address this, they used a bot, developed by Croteam member Nathan Brown who had previously developed bots for other games including the ones incorporated into ports of Serious Sam 3: BFE for consoles. The bot, named Bot, would watch the playthrough of a puzzle by a human player in terms of broad actions such as placing boxes on a switch for the completion of a puzzle. Then, as the puzzle's environment was tuned and decorated, they would have Bot attempt to solve the puzzle, testing to make sure it did not run into any dead-ends. If it did encounter any, Bot reported these through an in-house bug reporting system and then used game cheats to move on and finish out testing, which took between 30 and 60 minutes for the full game. As such, they were able to quickly iterate and resolve such problems when new features were introduced to the game. Overall, Croteam estimates they logged about 15,000 hours with Bot before the release of the public test version, and expect to use similar techniques in future games. They also used human playtesters to validate other more aesthetic factors of the game prior to the title's release.

The story was written by Tom Jubert (The Swapper, FTL: Faster Than Light) and Jonas Kyratzes. The two were brought about a year into the game's development, with about 80% of the puzzles completed, to link the puzzles together with a proper narrative. Croteam appreciated Jubert's previous narrative work in The Swapper and contacted him, and he in turn brought Jonas Kyratzes to help him with his writing, being overburdened with other projects at the time. Croteam regarded their setting as being part of an odd computer simulation that is "about robots and sentience and philosophy and God". Jubert's previous work on The Swapper revolved around the philosophical differences between body and soul; Jubert recommended Kyratzes based on his writing for the game The Infinite Ocean which was about artificial intelligence. Together, they quickly devised the narrative of an automaton being guided by god-like Elohim through the puzzles. They added flavor through both messages left from other automatons (primarily written by Kyratzes) and the apparently sentient helper program Milton (primarily written by Jubert). Much of this dialog was based on their own personal experiences and interactions on various Internet forums and web sites over 20 years. Kyratzes also stated that he was fascinated by the Garden of Eden concept originating from the Bible and re-envisioned many times over in other works. They sought to capture the sense of problem-solving that humans naturally do, and were able to place more of the game's larger story in spaces that would require exploration to find, which Kyratzes felt the game's level and puzzle designs strongly encouraged. According to Jubert, the works of science fiction author Philip K. Dick served as a significant influence to the motif of the game. The two were also brought on to help on the story for the expansion Road to Gehenna, though while sooner in the development process than the main game, still at a point where many of the puzzles had been completed.

The Talos Principle was shown in Sony's E3 2014 presentation, after which Time featured the game as one of its "favorite hidden gems from 2014's show". Before the game's release, Croteam published a free game demo for Linux, OS X and Windows on Steam, that featured four increasingly difficult complete puzzle levels as well as a benchmarking bot. Croteam also released a free teaser minigame for The Talos Principle called Sigils of Elohim, which offers sets of one puzzle type with tetrominoes that is found throughout The Talos Principle. Croteam had also built a community around the game through a series of contests and giveaways.

The game was released for several other platforms, including for Android platforms on 28 May 2015, PlayStation 4 on 13 October 2015. and on iOS devices on 11 October 2017. Virtual reality-enabled ports of the game for the Oculus Rift and HTC Vive were released on 17 October 2017. The Xbox One version, including enhanced graphics support for the Xbox One X, released on 31 August 2018. A Nintendo Switch version was released on 10 December 2019.

In 2015, Croteam added support for SteamVR in an update to The Talos Principle. The development of a version of the game intended for VR, The Talos Principle VR, was confirmed on 7 February 2017 via a blog post on the Croteam website. It was released on October 18, 2017.

The expansion pack, titled "Road to Gehenna" was announced by Croteam and Devolver Digital in March 2015. It was released on 23 July 2015 for Windows, OS X, and Linux. The PlayStation 4, Nintendo Switch, and the virtual reality ports included the "Road to Gehenna" DLC as part of the package.

A remastered version of the game, The Talos Principle: Reawakened, came out in April 2025 for PlayStation 5, Windows, and Xbox Series X/S. The remastered version has been rebuilt in Unreal Engine 5 and supports additional quality of life improvements. It includes both the Road to Gehenna expansion and a new expansion In the Beginning. Further, the remaster features a level editor that allows players to create their own puzzles and share with the community.

== Reception and legacy ==
Reception

Aggregate score
Aggregator	Score
Metacritic	(PC) 85/100 (PS4) 88/100

Review scores
Publication	Score
Destructoid	8/10
Eurogamer	9/10
Game Informer	9/10
GameSpot	9/10
GameTrailers	9.2/10
IGN	8.3/10
PC Gamer (UK)	84/100
VentureBeat	90/100
The Escapist	4/5
Hardcore Gamer	4/5

The Talos Principle received "generally favorable" reviews, with an aggregate score of 85/100 (55 reviews) for the PC, and a score of 88/100 (31 reviews) for the PS4 on Metacritic. Reviewers broadly praised both the challenge of the puzzles and the elements of philosophy built into the game's narrative. It has been regarded by various sources as one of the greatest puzzle games of all time. In 2020, Slant Magazine ranked The Talos Principle as one of the 100 best games of all time.

Arthur Gies of Polygon praised the game's inquisitive nature into philosophy by stating: "... Croteam has built a challenging, beautiful game that serves as a wonderful vehicle for some very serious questions about humanity, the technology we create, our responsibilities to it and its responsibilities to us. And The Talos Principle doesn't feel like a philosophy class lecture in the process." Praise was also given to the variation and ingenuity of the puzzles with one critic mentioned that "The variation and imagination in these puzzles is fantastic and the difficulty curve is one of the most finely crafted I have ever experienced ...". Chris Suellentrop of the New York Times praised the writing of the game by stating it was: "... one of the most literate and thoughtful games I’ve encountered". Several video game programmers and designers have also commented on the game. Markus Persson, creator of Minecraft, wrote: "Finished The Talos Principle, and I award this piece of fleeting entertainment five points out of five. Also it changed me." Alexander Bruce, creator of puzzle game Antichamber, commented: "Man. The Talos Principle was so excellent. My god. I loved it. Holy shit. Exceptional puzzle design and narrative structure."

The Talos Principle was influential in the design of the puzzle game The Turing Test.

=== Awards ===
GameTrailers awarded The Talos Principle as their Puzzle/Adventure Game of the Year. The Talos Principle was named as a finalist for the Excellence in Design and the Seumas McNally Grand Prize awards for the 2015 Independent Games Festival, and was nominated in Excellence in Narrative. At the 2015 National Academy of Video Game Trade Reviewers (NAVGTR) awards, the game won Game, Special Class.

== Sequel ==
A sequel, The Talos Principle 2, was released in November 2023.

== The Talos Principle: Reawakened ==
Reception

Aggregate score
Aggregator	Score
Metacritic	(PC) 89/100

A remaster, The Talos Principle: Reawakened, was released on April 10, 2025. The remaster uses updated graphics with Unreal Engine 5 and in addition to the base game and DLC, also contains additional content in puzzles and exposition.
