= Mikko Tarmia =

Finnish video game music composer (born 1978)

- Born: 1978 (age 47–48)
- Origin: Mikkeli, Finland
- Genres: Video game music
- Occupations: Composer, musician, sound designer
- Label: The Sound of Fiction
- Website: mikkotarmia.com

Mikko Tarmia is a Finnish video game music composer known for working with Codeblender Software, Frictional Games, and Wolfire Games. He founded the independent record label The Sound of Fiction.

His first work was with the Macintosh developer Codeblender Software, and between 2002 and 2005 worked on four games with them. He is most well known for making the music for the Penumbra series. His record label released the soundtrack for the games in January 2010. He also worked with Frictional Games for their game Amnesia: The Dark Descent, with a feature about him being included with the games special features. Tarmia's work is also featured in the 2023 Frictional Games release of Amnesia: The Bunker, another installment in the Amnesia survival horror game series.

He has worked on Frictional Games' SOMA and with Wolfire Games for their game Overgrowth.

== Games credited ==
- Amnesia: The Bunker
- Amnesia: Rebirth
- SOMA
- Overgrowth
- Amnesia: The Dark Descent
- Penumbra: Necrologue
- Penumbra: Requiem
- Penumbra: Black Plague
- Penumbra: Overture
- Pools
- Deep Trouble 2
- Rally Shift
- Epsilon Tahari: Reign of the Machines
- DeepTrouble
- The Designer's Curse
- The Designer's Curse Chapter 2 - Forgotten Horrors
