= Ontos =

Ontos may refer to:

- M50 Ontos, a self-propelled anti-tank weapon
- Ontos (video game), an upcoming video game
- One of the three Trinity Core Processors known as the Aegises in Xenoblade Chronicles 2
