= The Talos Principle 2 =

- Developer: Croteam
- Publisher: Devolver Digital
- Director: Davor Hunski
- Producer: Davor Hunski
- Designer: Davor Hunski
- Programmer: Davor Tomičić
- Artist: Davor Hunski
- Writers: Jonas Kyratzes; Verena Kyratzes; Tom Jubert
- Composer: Damjan Mravunac
- Engine: Unreal Engine 5
- Platforms: PlayStation 5; Windows; Xbox Series X/S
- Release: November 2, 2023
- Genres: Puzzle, adventure
- Mode: Single-player

The Talos Principle 2 is a puzzle-adventure video game developed by Croteam and published by Devolver Digital. A sequel to The Talos Principle (2014), the game was released for PlayStation 5, Windows, and Xbox Series X/S in November 2023 to generally positive reviews.

== Gameplay ==
Similar to its predecessor, The Talos Principle 2 is a first-person puzzle game; the core mechanic for the player is to be able to press a button at the end of an enclosed puzzle, which is separated from the entrance of the puzzle by various mechanics the player must utilize to gain access. To complete the main story, the player must complete 8 different puzzles in each of the 12 main areas. When eight puzzles in an area are complete, the player can then complete a tetromino puzzle to build a bridge in order to reach a large structure in the middle of the area. While there is no map for each area, the game HUD features a compass that features most relevant locations. Players can also find "sparks" hidden around an area: Utilizing a spark allows players to clear one puzzle without solving it.

Some mechanics from the first game return: Wall-mounted emitters emit laser beams which can be connected to receivers using connectors, which then trigger some sort of effect like opening a barrier, or powering another device. Additional tools include hexahedrons which are boxes players can stand on and place on pressure plates, large fans that can propel objects (or the player), platforms that can be held by robots over their heads, allowing other objects to be placed on them; and pressure plates. Progress is hindered by walls, fences, elevation, barriers (which can be often turned on or off using other elements), or exclusion fields which allow the player pass through but not any items; some of these hindrances may block laser beams, if the player places connectors in a way that they break line of sight. Jammers also return, which can disable powered items from a distance. Solving puzzles require the player to utilize combinations of such items and lateral thinking: for example, players may place a connector on a box which they can propel upwards using a fan - this way a connector would be able to float in the air to connect to generators and receivers where the line of sight would be blocked if it were simply on the ground. Unlike the first episode, the only way for the player to die is submersing into deep water or falling from certain heights: Turrets from the previous game are absent, and roving drones only appear in an optional stealth level.

As the player progresses, new items to the sequel are introduced: "RGB Converters" can combine lasers of two of the primary colors, and produce the third, complementary color; "inverters" can turn red lasers into blue and vice versa; "drillers" can create a temporary hole on a specific type of wall that can pass items and laser beams through (but not the player); blank robots can be teleported into, leaving the original body behind; anti-gravity beams can change the localized gravity behavior of an item (or the player), causing them to fall sideways or upwards; "swappers" provide additional items, but players must place in another item as a trade; teleport pads can be teleported to; drones that can be powered to carry items on a set path; "accumulators" that are connectors that, when connected to a laser beam, store that color and can emit it without being connected; and "activators" that, when powered with a correctly colored laser beam, activate any other powered item within a certain radius. Some levels also feature walls that the player can walk up vertically on, changing their orientation.

The game features a number of optional puzzles, which, when completed, unlock additional secrets: Each area features two "Lost" puzzles, which are harder than the main story puzzles; completing all Lost puzzles opens up the Golden Gates which then include even harder puzzles, which when completed modify the game's ending slightly. Each area also features two unlockable stars that are tied to monuments of either Prometheus, Pandora, or The Sphinx: Prometheus' puzzles are solved by finding a "sprite" around the map and chasing it back to the statue, Pandora's puzzles are solved by aiming a correct colored laser from one of the main story puzzles onto the receiver on the box Pandora is holding, while The Sphinx' puzzles involve some other, bespoke mechanic custom to that area. Collecting all stars unlocks an additional cutscene.

== Plot ==
The Talos Principle 2 takes place some years after the first game, which occurred after humanity was wiped out by a virus released from the permafrost due to global warming; to salvage their knowledge before they died, a group of humans established a project to create sapient artificial intelligence by solving puzzles within a virtual space, with those that succeed inhabiting android bodies and continue to extend humankind. The first android to awaken (the player character from The Talos Principle) was Athena, who manufactured the first twelve androids (referred to as the first companions) who gradually built New Jerusalem, collecting resources to build more androids.

The game starts with the awakening of the one thousandth android, named "1k". 1k is brought to New Jerusalem, a city created by the androids, and welcomed as the completion of "the Goal" of having one thousand androids, as established by Athena (No. 001), who has since disappeared and gained the status among a portion of the androids as a religious figure. During the celebration, a holographic figure of Prometheus appears to the androids warning them of more challenges for them to face, while simultaneously, sensors detect a massive energy surge far from the city. As 1k is the newest android and free of the numerous political disagreements in the city, 1k is asked to come on an expedition to this location, discovering a pyramid-like megastructure, as well as several outlying areas that tie into it. (Note: The player can also choose to refuse to join the expedition, resulting in a joke ending where the game ends, quickly scrolls through the credits, and cuts to a post-credits scene showing the expedition standing at the megastructure, lamenting that 1k did not join them.) These new areas are found to have similar puzzles as from the virtual space, and 1k is assigned to solve them. The androids are shocked to witness numerous technologies, such as matter fabricating from floating high-energy particles, massive power generators, and consciousness transference. When 1k completes a set of puzzles resulting in activating colored lasers, they are able to enter a portion of the central megastructure. They encounter holograms of Prometheus, who encourages the androids to "seek the flame"; Pandora, who is paranoid about the flame destroying the androids; and the Sphinx, who questions them about the follies of humankind and their quest for knowledge.

In addition to these messages, 1k encounters recordings and echoes of Athena and other early founders of New Jerusalem. Through these recordings, 1k learns that the megastructure and the surrounding areas were built by Athena after she and Cornelius created a child android, Miranda. After decades of study and research, the trio created the Noema Project, resulting in Athena discovering the theory of everything, which allowed her to create a singularity, enabling the numerous physics-defying technologies around the megastructure to work. However, during an experiment, Miranda was destroyed in a lab explosion. Grief-stricken, Athena entered the machine. While her initial intent was to use the technology to help New Jerusalem and her fellow androids, she became stuck in a logic loop.

After completing half of the puzzles, the expedition returns to the inside of the megastructure, where Byron (No. 007) activates a terminal, becoming stuck in the loop, and Pandora violently drives off the other androids, declaring that they will never be ready to use the technology of the machine wisely. The team returns to New Jerusalem to report, but come back to rescue Byron. After completing all of the regular puzzles, Byron is freed, telling the other androids that Athena is stuck in the machine, and that Prometheus, Pandora, and the Sphinx are all projections of Athena's hopes, fears, and self-doubts respectively. While fleeing the megastructure again, 1k is struck with a massive electrical surge.

Several weeks later, 1k awakens in New Jerusalem, having been repaired. Depending on the player's philosophical choices throughout the game, the leadership of New Jerusalem may have changed, and 1k returns to the singularity with a clear goal of either coopting it or destroying it, but to save Athena regardless. If enough puzzles are solved, Cornelius contacts 1k, imploring him to solve the twelve gold door puzzles which will allow him to access the machine's memory, where he believes Miranda's consciousness was saved as she was connected to the machine when her android body was destroyed.

Entering the machine, 1k reaches Athena, who gives 1k the ultimate choice to take over or shut down the machine. Depending on the leadership of New Jerusalem, the ultimate fate of the machine, and whether or not Miranda is returned to life alters the epilogue of the story.

=== Road to Elysium ===
The Road to Elysium expansion pack features three individual stories:

- In Orpheus Ascending, the player plays as 1k to enter a simulation, to retrieve the memories of a citizen called Sarabhai who perished in a power plant explosion; in the simulation, solving puzzles recovers fragments of Sarabhai's memories, where they explain their love for their partner Hypatia. Solving the game allows the citizens of New Jerusalem to reconstruct both Sarabhai and Hypatia, and reunite them; solving three additional star-puzzles recovers an additional memory of Sarabhai's near-death experience.
- In Isle of the Blessed, the player plays as Yaqut, the pilot from the base game's story. Since the events of the base game, Yaqut has been dating Miranda, (Note: This is seen in the ending of the base game if the player rescues Miranda; Jonas Kyratzes has confirmed that Miranda being saved is the canon ending, and is the premise the DLC builds on.) but is very self-conscious about being a good partner. When a citizen called Barzai announces a large scale exhibition, which features brand new puzzles, the team from the base game decides to take a vacation and visit the exhibition, and Yaqut feels compelled to solve them all to impress Miranda - despite her insisting that it does not matter. After solving all the puzzles, Yaqut admits that he learned to enjoy the process, while Miranda concludes that the point of the exhibition was to realize that doing things for fun, without a higher purpose, is important.
- Into The Abyss plays during the period in the base game's story when Byron gets stuck in the megastructure; it shows Byron being trapped in a world based on Athena's mind, with her fears and nightmares of her decisions haunting her. In that world, Byron is guided by Elohim and is asked to solve eight extremely difficult trials to safely leave the loop. If all twenty four puzzles are solved, a cutscene of Byron talking to his subconscious self plays.

== Development ==
Developer Croteam announced that they were working on a sequel, The Talos Principle 2, in May 2016. On September 23, 2020, one day before the release of Serious Sam 4, Croteam writer Jonas Kyratzes confirmed that The Talos Principle 2 was still "definitely happening." Kyratzes explained that The Talos Principle 2's story was "challenging" to create due to the original's plot having "wrapped up so well". Kyratzes also explained that work on the game had been slow due to the development of Croteam's other two games: the aforementioned Serious Sam 4, and The Hand of Merlin. He also stated that The Talos Principle 2 would be the company's next focus following Serious Sam 4's release.

In May 2023 at the virtual PlayStation Showcase livestream event, it was announced that the sequel will be released by the end of the year. The sequel builds on the first game's origin story of robotkind by exploring the newly emerged robotic civilization. It was showcased at Gamescom 2023. The sequel was released on 2 November 2023. It is powered by the Unreal Engine 5, as Croteam decided to move away from their in-house engine following the release of Serious Sam 4. Initially, The Talos Principle 2 was developed in Unreal Engine 4 but development later switched to Unreal Engine 5 to make use of its features like Nanite, Lumen, World Partition, Virtual Texturing, Virtual Shadow Maps, and Local Exposure. Epic Games advised the team throughout development on the Unreal engine; Croteam were the first studio in the world to develop on Unreal version 5.2.

=== Downloadable content ===
Road to Elysium, a three-chapter expansion to The Talos Principle 2, was released June 14, 2024.

== Reception ==
=== Critical reception ===
Reception

Aggregate scores
Aggregator	Score
Metacritic	(PC) 88/100 (PS5) 90/100 (XSXS) 85/100
OpenCritic	99% recommend

Review scores
Publication	Score
Digital Trends	4/5 stars
Eurogamer	4/5 stars
Game Informer	8.75/10
GameSpot	9/10
GamesRadar+	4.5/5 stars
IGN	8/10
PC Gamer (US)	89/100
Push Square	9/10 stars
Shacknews	9/10

According to review aggregator website Metacritic, the PlayStation 5 version received "universal acclaim", while the PC and Xbox Series X versions received "generally favorable reviews".

Will Borger from IGN praised the game's puzzle design, its exploration of philosophy themes and its story, describing it as "thoughtful, heartfelt, and deeply moving". Dominic Tarason from PC Gamer compared the puzzle design to Portal and how the game gradually introduces new mechanics to players. He enjoyed the game's larger emphasis on narrative, praising the game's dialogue for being "deeply compelling and fully worthwhile". He concluded his review by writing that The Talos Principle 2 is "not just a great sequel, but a thoughtful and human narrative adventure wrapped in a satisfying and beautiful puzzle game".

New Game Network declared The Talos Principle 2 its Best Story and Best Puzzle Game award winners for 2023.

=== Sales ===
From its release on November 2, until November 19, the game sold 100,000 copies. It reached the highest number of concurrent players on Steam among games published by Devolver Digital in 2023.

== Sequel ==
The final entry to the series, The Talos Principle 3, was announced on May 13, 2026. It is set to release on PlayStation 5 and Windows.
