= Ontos (video game) =

- Developer: Frictional Games
- Publisher: Kepler Interactive
- Writer: Philip Gelatt
- Engine: HPL Engine 4
- Platforms: PlayStation 5; Windows; Xbox Series X/S
- Release: 2027
- Genre: Psychological thriller
- Mode: Single-player

Ontos is an upcoming psychological thriller video game developed by Frictional Games and published by Kepler Interactive. It is the spiritual successor to Soma (2015). The game is set to be released for PlayStation 5, Windows, and Xbox Series X/S in 2027.

== Gameplay ==
Ontos is a psychological thriller video game played from a first-person perspective. As players explore the moon hotel Samsara, which was described by Frictional Games as a large, interconnected space, they will encounter various non-playable characters and complete "Experiments", which are narrative puzzles in which players have to make moral choices that not only affect the outcome of the mission but the rest of the narrative as they progress. There are often multiple ways to solve a puzzle or resolve a conflict. Ontos has a nonlinear narrative, meaning that players can complete missions in different order before reaching its conclusion.

== Story ==
The game follows an engineer named Aditi Amani, who must explore a hotel on the Moon named Samsara to find out the truth about her estranged father. Guided by fragments of the past, she will find out about the mysteries behind Samsara, and the unsettling truths about the nature of reality.

== Development ==
Developer Frictional Games described Ontos as a spiritual successor to Soma (2015), as both shared similar philosophical themes and gameplay. Development of the game lasted for more than 10 years. According to Thomas Grip, the founder of Frictional Games, Ontos had a more "cerebral" focus, as players will face strange, disturbing scenarios, unlike Amnesia which was meant to evoke a more "primal" sense of fear. The narrative choices in the game were designed to leave players questioning their own morality. Grip further added that the game was about forcing players to "grapple with heavy and thought provoking themes" to evoke a sense of "deep existential terror". The game was designed to be more open-ended to reward players' choice. Puzzles were deprioritized in favour of extended story sequences known as "Experiments", which were singled out as the highlight of the game by Grip. It can often be resolved with multiple approaches, though players must first explore thoroughly to find all viable paths. The game utilized Frictional's own proprietary HPL4 engine. Samsara was designed to feel "lived-in", and that every room in the hotel was designed to provide players with additional information about the game's story and setting.

Ontos was announced by Frictional Games and publisher Kepler Interactive in December 2025 during The Game Awards. The reveal trailer also announced that Stellan Skarsgård had joined the voice cast. The game is set to be released for Windows, PlayStation 5, and Xbox Series X/S in 2027.
