= Umbral =

Umbral is derived from the Latin word umbra, meaning "shadow". It is also the Spanish and Portuguese word for "threshold" and is sometimes used as a surname in those languages.

Umbral may also refer to:

- Umbral calculus, the surprising similarity between seemingly unrelated polynomial equations and certain shadowy techniques used to "prove" them
- Umbral moonshine, a mysterious connection between Niemeier lattices and Ramanujan's mock theta functions
- Francisco Umbral (1932–2007), Spanish journalist, novelist, biographer and essayist

== See also ==
- Umbra (disambiguation)
