= Umbra (disambiguation) =

The umbra is the innermost and darkest part of a shadow, where the light source is completely blocked by the occluding body.

Umbra may also refer to:

== Brands and companies ==
- Umbra (3D technology company), a Finnish video game middleware company
- Umbra (housewares company), a Canadian designer and manufacturer of housewares
- Umbra (typeface), an American typeface designed by R. Hunter Middleton

== Fictional characters, locations and objects ==
- Umbra (comics), a member of the Legion of Super-Heroes
- Umbra (World of Darkness), a realm within the World of Darkness universe
- Lord Umbra, the main antagonist of the animated television series Mighty Orbots
- Umbra Witches, a clan of witches in the video game series Bayonetta
- Umbra, a sphere-like creature in Warhammer 40,000
- Umbra, a sword and multiple characters in The Elder Scrolls series
- Queen Umbra, the final boss of Child of Light
- Excalibur Umbra, a player character in Warframe

== Music ==
- Umbra (album), a 2001 album by Boom Boom Satellites
- Umbra, a song by Karnivool from the 2009 album Sound Awake
- Umbra, the penultimate track from the 2025 Ghost album Skeletá

== Other uses ==
- Shade (mythology) or umbra, the spirit or ghost of a dead person, residing in the underworld
- Umbra (fish), a genus of freshwater fishes of the family Umbridae
- Umbra (poets), a collective of young black writers who published Umbra Magazine
- Umbra, the circular dark region of a sunspot that is surrounded by the semi-bright penumbra

== See also ==
- Penumbra (disambiguation)
- Umber (disambiguation)
- Umbral (disambiguation)
