= Soma (video game) =

2015 survival horror video game

- Developers: Frictional Games; Abylight Studios (Switch)
- Publishers: Frictional Games; Abylight Studios (Switch)
- Director: Thomas Grip
- Writer: Mikael Hedberg
- Composer: Mikko Tarmia
- Engine: HPL Engine 3
- Platforms: Linux; macOS; PlayStation 4; Windows; Xbox One; Nintendo Switch
- Release: Linux, macOS, PS4, Windows; 22 September 2015; Xbox One; 1 December 2017; Nintendo Switch; 24 July 2025
- Genre: Survival horror
- Mode: Single-player

Soma is a 2015 survival horror video game developed and published by Frictional Games. The game follows protagonist Simon Jarrett, who gains consciousness in a deteriorating underwater research facility under mysterious circumstances. Encountering machinery exhibiting human characteristics like possessing consciousness and distinct personalities, he sets out to uncover the events that led to the facility's current state while trying to make sense of his predicament and uncertain future.

Soma's gameplay builds on the conventions established in the previous horror titles of Frictional Games (notably, Amnesia: The Dark Descent) including an emphasis on stealthy evasion of threats, puzzle-solving, and immersion. However, in a break with this tradition, it also de-emphasizes aspects such as inventory management in favour of a tighter focus on narrative and character development.

Soma was released on 22 September 2015 for Windows, macOS, Linux, and PlayStation 4, and on 1 December 2017 for Xbox One. A port to the Nintendo Switch developed and published by Abylight Studios was released on 24 July 2025. It received generally positive reviews from critics, with praise for its story, themes, atmosphere, sound design, and voice acting, though its enemy design and encounters received criticism. A spiritual successor titled Ontos is set to be released in 2027.

== Gameplay ==
Soma is a survival horror video game with psychological horror elements played from a first-person perspective. The player encounters numerous creatures, each of which embody an aspect of the game's themes. Throughout Soma, the player will find a large array of clues, such as notes and audio tapes, which builds atmosphere and provides background to the narrative. Similar to most titles by Frictional Games, the player progresses the plot through puzzle-solving, exploration, and the use of stealth; the player may die if they fail to avoid monsters, although two years after the initial release, a "Safe Mode" has been added that keeps the monsters but stops them from killing the player. Continuing the trend from previous Frictional Games titles, the player is unable to obtain any weapons, meaning the only option is to attempt to outrun or hide from the monsters.

== Plot ==
=== Setting ===
Soma takes place in 2104 and is set in PATHOS-II, a sophisticated research outpost and underwater research facility located in the North Atlantic Ocean that has fallen into a state of disrepair. Originally established as a thermal mining operation in the 2060s by conglomerates Haimatsu and Carthage Industries, PATHOS-II's primary purpose shifted to space technology and the operation of the Omega Space Gun – an electromagnetic railgun designed to launch satellites and other small equipment into orbit without the cost or risks of traditional rockets. All operations and maintenance on PATHOS-II are overseen by the Warden Unit (WAU), an artificial general intelligence integrated with all computer systems in the facility.

The crew of PATHOS-II unexpectedly became the last people alive on Earth after a major extinction event caused by a comet striking the planet. The crew survived on a day-to-day basis, attempting to fight the negative effects of their collective isolation, as well as other issues that began to pose a threat to their well-being.

=== Story ===
In 2015, Simon Jarrett survives a car accident, but sustains severe brain damage and cranial bleeding. Due to his injuries, Simon agrees to undergo an experimental brain scan. During the scan, Simon appears to black out, and regains consciousness in Site Upsilon of PATHOS-II, a seemingly abandoned subsea geothermal power plant. Confused, Simon explores Upsilon and makes contact with a woman named Catherine Chun, who invites him to Site Lambda and reveals that he is currently in the year 2104, one year after a comet devastated the Earth and left PATHOS-II as the final known outpost of humanity. While he is talking to Catherine, a communication array goes offline, forcing Simon to attempt to fix it. When the communication platform Simon is in floods, he briefly blacks out and awakens to discover that he is unexpectedly inside a diving suit. Exploring the seabed around Site Upsilon, he manages to find the facility's internal transport train and uses it to travel to Site Lambda. Throughout the journey, Simon encounters robots — both hostile and passive — that believe they are human.

Arriving at Site Lambda, Simon discovers that Catherine is not human, but a brain scan of a PATHOS-II employee downloaded into a robot's storage unit. Simon later learns that he died in 2015 after his brain reconstruction treatment was a failure. His brain scan was later used as a historical template for AI reconstruction until it was uploaded into the modified corpse of another PATHOS-II employee by WAU, 89 years later. The WAU took control of the facility and turned all the surviving humans into grotesque, mechanically animated automatons to fulfill its task of preserving humanity. Catherine explains that prior to the facility falling into disarray, members of the crew, aware of their pending demise, proposed that the sole means of any form of humanity surviving Earth is the ARK, a digital black box aboard a miniature solar-powered satellite. Designed by Catherine, it houses a simulated world in which the brain scans of many of the PATHOS-II personnel have been preserved, the source of the crew's personalities uploaded by the WAU to any mechanical host capable of hosting one. Despite its completion the ARK has not yet been sent into space using the facility's space gun. Simon agrees to aid Catherine in recovering the ARK and completing her mission.

Since the ARK is kept in the Tau site at the absolute depths of the Atlantic Ocean, Simon heads toward the Theta site to retrieve a submarine named DUNBAT that can withstand the abyssal pressure. However, the WAU has preemptively tampered with the DUNBAT, forcing Simon to make his way to the Omicron site to find a new body capable of travelling through the seabed. While searching for the essential components at Site Omicron, Simon receives mental messages from a WAU-converted (but still sane) artificial intelligence specialist, Johan Ross, who begs him to destroy the WAU. After completing Simon's new body, Catherine copies his consciousness into it. Simon realizes that his old body is still conscious, forcing him to choose between euthanizing the Simon in his old body or leaving him to whatever fate befalls him.

Descending into the abyss, Simon braves it and its fauna modified by WAU and retrieves the ARK from Site Tau, where he finds it guarded by the last fully human survivor of PATHOS-II, Sara Lindwall. Relieved of her duty and having learned that she is likely the last human on Earth, she asks Simon to kill her by disabling her life support, a request the player may choose to oblige. Simon takes the ARK toward Site Phi, where the Omega space cannon is located. However, he is forced to take a detour through Site Alpha, where the WAU's core is located. Here, Ross reveals to Simon that the structural gel with which he created his new body was designed by Ross to poison and destroy the WAU, and that his colleagues refused to use it in time. Ross gives Simon the opportunity to eliminate the WAU, while secretly planning to kill him to prevent the WAU from adapting to Simon's immunity. Before he can do so, Ross is devoured by a mutated aquatic leviathan, from which Simon escapes by reaching the Phi site.

At the Phi site, he discovers the body of the original Catherine who was accidentally killed in a confrontation with other PATHOS-II staff who refused to launch the ARK due to fears of a potential launch failure. Catherine then copies their brain scans into the ARK at the last moment before it is launched into space. Simon is confronted with the fact that his perception of self remains in the pilot seat. Catherine explains that it is their copies that are on the ARK; they argue frantically about the matter until Catherine's cortex chip short-circuits from overexertion, effectively killing her. Simon is left helpless and alone in the darkness of the abyss.

In a post-credits scene, the copy of Simon uploaded to the ARK awakens and reunites with Catherine in an idyllic, simulated landscape. Meanwhile, the ARK drifts off into space and leaves the devastated Earth behind.

== Development ==
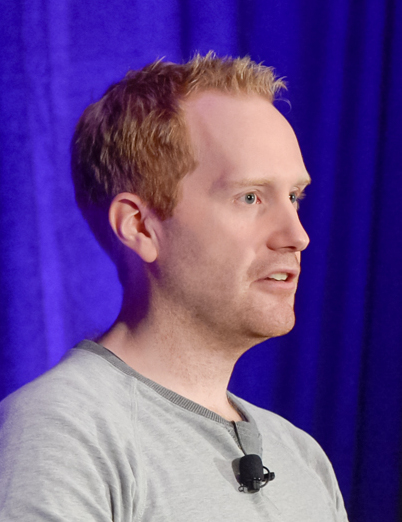
Thomas Grip of Frictional Games presents Soma at the 2016 Game Developers Conference.

Soma was in the making since 2010, beginning with the advancement of new technology for the game engine. Setting the game at the bottom of the Atlantic Ocean was an idea decided on a "whim" by Frictional Games co-founders Thomas Grip and Jens Nilsson, which Grip said they had wanted to try for a long time. At some point in development, the story of the game underwent a number of major changes before ending up at the final version that was released, with an older build released via an easter egg. The storytelling was designed to rely on the player's actions rather than serve as a guide for the player to adhere to, so as to allow those who ignore exposition material, such as audio logs and notes, to follow the plot. Soma's underlying theme is consciousness, and was developed in order to explore the nature of free will and the self. The game's atmosphere was inspired by the work of Philip K. Dick, China Miéville, and Greg Egan.

Achieving a realistic sound to fit the mood required audio director Samuel Justice to utilise what he called "the room size system". Instead of processing sounds to make an effect possible, recordings were made of environments that complemented such needs, like the reverb of a large hall. With this system, over 2,000 footstep sounds were captured.

In January 2025, publisher Abylight Studios announced a collaboration with developer Frictional Games to bring three of their most recent games (Soma, Amnesia: The Bunker, and Amnesia: Rebirth) to the Nintendo Switch.

== Marketing ==
A teaser trailer featuring gameplay footage of Soma was released on 11 October 2013. The official website's info page displays a quote by author Philip K. Dick. Another trailer of the game was released in April 2014.

Two live action shorts, "Vivarium" and "Mockingbird," were shot back-to-back at LeftJet Studios in Seattle, over the course of nine days. The films were produced by Imagos Films, an independent film company based in Seattle. Imagos Films also completed for Frictional Games a set of live action clips that were set to release in 2015 in monthly installments and would connect to the story of the upcoming game. Due to production problems the release date was delayed and on 28 September, shortly after the release of the game, Frictional Games announced they had made available the first clip on their YouTube channel under the title "SOMA - Transmission #1", with seven more to follow in each coming day. The live action miniseries acts as a prequel to the events of the game, albeit one which is inspired by its plot and characters rather than being strictly canonical to it.

In collaboration with Frictional Games, a feature film tentatively called "DEPTH" was filmed by Imagos Films under the code name "Project Apophis". The film's director is Don Thacker and clips from it were used for Soma's marketing campaign, such as the "Transmissions" webseries. The film stars Trin Miller, Josh Truax, and Rachelle Henry, and was expected to release in 2016.

== Reception ==
Reception

Aggregate score
Aggregator	Score
Metacritic	(PC) 84/100 (PS4) 79/100 (XONE) 82/100

Review scores
Publication	Score
Destructoid	9/10
Game Informer	8.5/10
GameRevolution	5/5
GameSpot	9/10
GamesRadar+	3.5/5
GameTrailers	7.8/10
IGN	8.1/10
PC Gamer (US)	80/100
Polygon	9/10
VideoGamer.com	8/10

Soma received "generally favorable reviews" according to review aggregator website Metacritic.

Richard Wakeling from GameSpot gave the game a 9 out of 10, and praised the "engaging and thought-provoking" story, the "impressive" writing and voice acting, and the atmosphere and sound design, which together, fills the game with "dread" and provides a "chilling", "edge of your seat" feeling. However, Wakeling disliked the sections in which the player walks on the ocean floor, calling them "dull, plodding affairs" and "incredibly linear". Philip Kollar of Polygon also gave the game a 9/10 and wrote: "I don't know if SOMA will scare people as much as Amnesia did, but it is without a doubt a stronger game, with better pacing, smarter writing and more powerful subject matter. This isn't a horror game about obfuscation; events aren't building to a huge, shocking twist. More than anything, it's about the process of dealing with the horror of reality." Caitlin Cooke from Destructoid awarded the game a 9/10 as well. She stated "SOMA gets everything right about the survival horror genre. It's like someone created the perfect video game mixtape -- a little bit of abandoned underwater atmosphere from BioShock, detailed environments a la Gone Home, and (of course) the frenzied monster mechanics from Amnesia. Even if you dislike non-combat-oriented games, I dare you to give it a try."

Tim Turi from Game Informer awarded the game an 8.5 out of 10. He commended the sound for convincingly immersing the player in the game, as well as the "eerie" environments, the "simple", "reliable" controls, and the "intriguing" narrative. In his review for GamesRadar+, Leon Hurley wrote: "A disturbingly different take on interesting sci-fi concepts let down by a slow start ... but worth it overall." Hurley praised the "great" story, "likeable" characters, and the "interesting and unpredictable" locations. He also commended the game for its ability to pull the player through the story by providing rewarding situations, although Hurley did feel "lost" at times, as there are no distinct directions. IGN's Daniel Krupa scored the game an 8.1/10 and wrote: "SOMA is a sustained exploration of an original and thought-provoking idea. The concept of artificial intelligence has been explored by lots of science fiction, so it isn't unique in that regard, but it makes particularly intelligent use of video game conventions to present those familiar ideas in new and surprising ways."

Criticism of Soma focused on the implementation and design of its enemies. While Cooke generally enjoyed the monster encounters and their "unique and frightening" designs, she felt disappointed that there were only a few different types, most of which only made one appearance in the game. Turi found that the cat and mouse gameplay of stealthily evading monsters now felt "formulaic" in the genre and "required patience". Wakeling wrote that while the encounters were necessary to provide adversity, he felt they were otherwise "tedious" and found himself "clambering to get back to the story." Hurley wrote that the monsters lacked "threat" and "never really deliver ... they're little more than dumb ambulatory obstacles", being overcome by the player "looping around behind them, or slipping past while they obediently investigate thrown objects." Alex Avard of GamesRadar+ praised the game's "Safe Mode" update from 2017 that decreased the threat of the monsters, having felt they were originally "unwelcome interruptions to an otherwise enthralling mystery", but instead in Safe Mode gave the "high minded story the space it always needed to breathe". He wrote that the enemies' typically passive behavior and discernible forms improved the game's atmosphere and themes while allowing him to fully engage in the narrative, writing: "I'm no longer beset with frustrated paranoia or constantly distracted by my own survival instincts. Instead, my attention is entirely focused on engaging with Simon's personal journey and learning more about the history of PATHOS-II".

After ten days of release, Soma had sold 92,000 copies, exceeding the 20,000 copies made by the developer's previous game Amnesia: The Dark Descent in its first week. In March 2016, Frictional Games announced that the game had sold more than 250,000 copies and that the company was close to breaking even, which required them to sell 276,000 units. In a blog post commemorating one year of release, Frictional Games estimated that the sales figures had exceeded 450,000 copies. By March 2021, 1 million copies were sold on PC alone. At the 2016 Golden Joystick Awards, Soma was nominated for three categories: Best Original Game, Best Storytelling and Best Visual Design. In 2018, GamesRadar+ ranked the game 8th in their list of "the 20 best horror games of all time".

== See also ==
- Digital immortality
- Embodied cognition
- Mind uploading
- Open individualism
- Philosophical zombie
- Posthumanism
- Simulated reality
- Ship of Theseus
- Teletransportation paradox
- Transhumanism
- Turing test
- Vertiginous question
