= Penumbra: Overture =

2007 video game

- Developer: Frictional Games
- Publisher: Lexicon Entertainment
- Designer: Jens Nilsson
- Programmer: Thomas Grip
- Artist: Anton Adamse
- Writer: Tom Jubert
- Composer: Mikko Tarmia
- Engine: HPL Engine 1
- Platforms: Windows, Linux, Mac OS X
- Release: Windows: WW: 30 March 2007; NA: 8 May 2007 (Retail); Linux: WW: 31 May 2007; WW: 11 December 2012 (Steam); OS X 10 January 2008
- Genre: Survival horror
- Mode: Single-player

Penumbra: Overture (also known as Penumbra: Overture – Episode One) is the first in a series of episodic survival horror games developed by Frictional Games. The game follows a physicist named Philip who travels to Greenland after his mother's death and is forced to explore an abandoned mine. Penumbra: Overture received average reception from critics.

The game was originally intended as the first episode of a trilogy. With the announcement of the second episode, Penumbra: Black Plague, it was stated that the second game would be the final chapter. However, an expansion has been released since then: Penumbra: Requiem, technically giving the series a third chapter.

== Gameplay ==
Although Frictional Games describes Penumbra: Overture as a "first-person adventure", the game blends the genres of survival horror, psychological horror, and adventure. The use of the Newton Game Dynamics physics engine emphasizes physics-based puzzles as well as physics-based combat. The game also takes advantage of advanced artificial intelligence to respond realistically to noises and light, creating stealth-based gameplay. There are no firearms in the game, so during combat the player is limited to improvised melee fighting with a hammer or pickaxe, or throwing objects at attacking creatures. The game is designed to emphasize stealth and avoidance over direct conflict. For example, Philip can close doors behind him to temporarily hold off attacking enemies.

The game's main focus is on exploration and classic adventure game object interaction: examining and collecting objects and using them to solve puzzles. These mostly involve finding keys or other objects that can either be used by themselves or in combination with each other to solve certain problems. In addition to these standard inventory based puzzles, Overture also offers several physics-based puzzles where certain objects must be moved or manipulated in real time. Environmental objects such as doors, desk drawers, and switches on machinery must be opened or manipulated using realistic movements mirroring their use in the real world, and certain obstructions can only be cleared by utilizing certain objects in a specific way; for example, in order to solve one of the game's puzzles a player may choose to stack boxes and barrels in such a manner as to allow for the player to be able to leap past an obstacle, such as an electrical fence, or to reach a certain area normally too high to reach.

Essential to puzzle solving is the ability to read written notes scattered around the mine by its previous inhabitants, which often offer clues or solutions as to how to get past a certain area, as well as providing plot exposition and character development. The player also has access to a notebook where important information and the players goals and objectives are recorded.

== Plot ==
Set in the year 2001, (Note: Philip receives the letter in 2000, but the game starts a year later:) Penumbra: Overture follows the story of Philip, a thirty-year-old physicist whose mother has recently died. After receiving a mysterious letter from his supposedly dead father, Philip follows a series of clues that lead him to a mysterious location in uninhabited northern Greenland. The harsh cold forces him to take shelter in an abandoned mine, the entrance of which collapses as he enters it, and he is forced to move deeper inside. Within the mine, Philip discovers diary extracts written by a stranded scientist who gradually resorted to eating cave-dwelling spiders as an alternative food source as his supplies diminished.

The scientist also describes discovering a psychoactive toxin in the spiders and deduces that, after eight months of using them to supplement his diet, it was beginning to have an effect on him. Philip begins to receive radio messages from Tom "Red" Redwood, a man driven insane by cabin fever. Red promises that, if he is found, he will give Philip answers. The game follows Philip as he descends deeper into the mines in search of Red while unravelling the secrets of their previous and current inhabitants.

Philip quickly discovers that the mine is inhabited by an ecosystem of abnormally large and hostile animals: dogs, giant spiders, and gargantuan earthworms, among others. Abandoned outposts and various papers scattered throughout the mine indicate that a secret society is studying some unusual phenomena inside the mines.

Following clues and solving various puzzles, Philip eventually comes to an area deep within the mine where Red is waiting for him. Red waits inside an incinerator, where he begs Philip to kill him. With no other option, Philip activates the incinerator and, amongst Red's remains, he finds an item that he needs in order to progress into a new area of the mine identified as "The Shelter". Once inside, Philip notices what appears to be a human watching him. Philip approaches the figure, but the lighting is suddenly extinguished, and Philip is knocked out and dragged away.

== Development ==
The Penumbra Tech Demo from 2006

The full commercial game Overture

=== Tech demo ===
Penumbra: Overture is based on Frictional Games' earlier game Penumbra, a short tech demo meant to demonstrate the capabilities of the company's HPL Engine 1.

The developers admitted to making significant modifications of the original engine to accommodate the 3D graphics in this game: "The engine is built from an engine created when making a thesis job which resulted in the platform game Energetic. Before moving into the 3rd dimension I made some cleanup of the engine (which was quite rushed in some places) and started to add a base for 3D rendering. I would not say that the original 2D engine was modified to add 3D, but rather a 3D layer was added so all of the 2D stuff is still there. It is still possible to make a 2D tile game using our engine".

While not initially intended to be a commercial product, Penumbra was received exceedingly well, and Frictional decided to develop it into a full-length game.

=== Release ===
The first episode of Penumbra was released on 30 March 2007, through various online distribution websites. The game was simultaneously released in a boxed edition in the United Kingdom, and the boxed release in the United States was shipped to retailers on 8 May. On 30 May, the full version for Linux was released on the Frictional Games store.

In addition, the game became available on GameTap on 4 October. On 10 January 2008, the full version for Mac OS X was released on the Frictional Games forum for PowerPC and Intel architectures. In March 2009, Paradox Interactive released Penumbra Overture in a collection pack along with Penumbra: Black Plague and Penumbra: Requiem. The game became available via Steam on 7 March.

Overture was released as part of the Humble Indie Bundle, and when the Bundle made more than $1 million, Overture's source code was released under the GNU GPL-3.0-or-later. Frictional Games also hosts a dedicated forum on their website where people can discuss the code and any projects based around it.

== Reception ==
Reception

Aggregate score
Aggregator	Score
Metacritic	73/100

Review scores
Publication	Score
1Up.com	C
Adventure Gamers	3.5/5
Eurogamer	7/10
GameSpot	7.8/10
GamesTM	6/10
GameZone	7.5/10
IGN	7/10
PC Format	79%
PC Gamer (US)	74%
VideoGamer.com	6/10
The New York Times	(positive)

The game received "average" reviews according to the review aggregation website Metacritic. It was criticized on a number of fronts, especially for its rather crude combat system and sometimes confusing or poorly implemented story elements, causing Eurogamer to comment that the game would "do better if it relied on its own inherent spookiness rather than trying to create artificial atmosphere by banging on about a character we don't have any real reason to care about, something about his dad, destiny and miners writing stupidly long notes to themselves about their imminent horrible deaths". It did however praise the character of Red, stating that he was "the most compelling element of the narrative, and wonderfully acted". GameSpot in its review commented on the combat by saying that fights are often "so frenetic that it's almost impossible to control your movements" and that "it would have been much more sensible for the camera to lock on and move with enemies". It did however note that it did help differentiate Overture from more action oriented titles, saying that the "end result of the difficult combat is that you feel like an average Joe who wants to avoid zombie dogs with glowing eyes, not a video game superman out to stack dead canines like cordwood".

Despite these apparent flaws, the game was praised for its unsettling and creepy atmosphere, with The Adrenaline Vault deciding that "every element in the game is geared to set a dark, scary mood. On occasion, you'll feel helpless, overwhelmed, guilty and frightened. I think this is helped, rather than hindered, by the developer's choice to keep physical fights intermittent and less gory and bloody than in many other horror games. The result is a sense of depressing solitude, with the disturbing knowledge that you're not alone". The game's approach to puzzle solving was also generally well received, with Worthplaying stating that "the control scheme adds an interesting touch to the game and helps with the immersion", although GameZone in their review of the game complained that "sometimes having to interact with things in this way lead to problems, as in when necessary actions were hard to accomplish". While the game's production values were lower than some of the other titles released around the same time, Adventure Gamers noted that for "an independent project from a team of four people, the game looks great, besides a few shoddy textures", and saying that the game's sound effects "help set the mood" and are "realistic and jarring".

Many of the criticisms directed at Overture were taken into consideration during the development of the next episode Penumbra: Black Plague. These changes included the removal of dogs and other combat related enemies, as well as moving away somewhat from a reliance on written notes. The combat system was also dropped entirely and the physics system somewhat reworked, leading the game to be even more stealth based than its predecessor. Black Plague received slightly more positive reviews from critics, and its design was for the most part mirrored with only a few additions by Frictional's critically acclaimed 2010 spiritual successor to the series, Amnesia: The Dark Descent.

Linux Format wrote that "Considering the price, and the fact that the Linux version comes hot on the heels of the original Windows release (and before an imminent OS X version), this is a great addition for any devoted Linux gamer... It's not a masterpiece, but if we can drum up enough support for the first episode, it will hopefully mean that the developers can approach the next episode with renewed confidence."
