= Amnesia: The Dark Descent =

2010 video game

- European Windows box art
- Developer: Frictional Games
- Publisher: Frictional Games
- Designers: Thomas Grip; Jens Nilsson
- Programmers: Thomas Grip; Luis A. Rodero Morales
- Writers: Mikael Hedberg; Thomas Grip
- Composer: Mikko Tarmia
- Series: Amnesia
- Engine: HPL Engine 2
- Platforms: Linux; Mac OS X; Windows; PlayStation 4; Xbox One; Nintendo Switch
- Release: 8 September 2010: Linux, OS X, Windows; 8 September 2010; PlayStation 4; 22 November 2016; Xbox One; 28 September 2018; Switch; 12 September 2019
- Genres: Survival horror, adventure
- Mode: Single-player

Amnesia: The Dark Descent is a 2010 survival horror adventure game developed and published by the Swedish game development studio Frictional Games. It was first released on 8 September 2010 for Microsoft Windows, Mac OS X, and Linux. Later, it was released to PlayStation 4 on 22 November 2016, Xbox One on 28 September 2018, and Nintendo Switch on 12 September 2019 as part of The Amnesia Collection. The game follows Daniel, who must explore the dark and foreboding Castle Brennenburg, while trying to maintain his sanity by avoiding monsters and unsettling events.

Amnesia was met with a positive critical reception upon release. Reviewers consistently highlighted its innovative approach to survival horror, unique gameplay mechanics, and ability to evoke genuine fear, though some noted shortcomings in its narrative resolution and technical aspects. The game won a number of awards and garnered retrospective praise as one of the most influential games of the decade, and one of the best horror games of all time. It is also credited as contributing to the rise of popular Let's Play videos on the streaming platform YouTube.

Amnesia was followed by Amnesia: A Machine for Pigs (2013), an indirect sequel developed by The Chinese Room. In 2016, Amnesia: The Collection was released, a compilation that included Amnesia: The Dark Descent, its expansion Amnesia: Justine (2011), and Amnesia: A Machine for Pigs. In 2020, the series made a return with Amnesia: Rebirth, developed by Frictional Games, and serving as a direct sequel to The Dark Descent. The most recent addition to the franchise was released in 2023, titled Amnesia: The Bunker.

== Gameplay ==
Daniel is chased by a Grunt, one of several monsters encountered in the castle.

Amnesia: The Dark Descent is a first-person survival horror adventure game. The player takes control of Daniel, an archaeologist who must navigate Castle Brennenburg while avoiding various hazards and solving puzzles. The gameplay retains the physical object interaction used in the Penumbra series, allowing for physics-based puzzles and interactions such as opening doors and fixing machinery. Smaller items can be stored in an inventory menu, while larger objects can be raised by holding down a mouse button and pushing or pulling the mouse. Objects such as doors or levers can be manipulated by using the mouse in a fashion that imitates moving the said object. The difficulty level can be adjusted before starting the game, but cannot be readjusted once the game has begun.

In addition to a health indicator, Daniel's sanity must be managed, centered around an "afraid of darkness" mechanic. According to designer Thomas Grip, "the idea was basically that the darkness itself should be an enemy." Sanity is reduced by staying in the dark for too long, witnessing unsettling events or looking directly at monsters. Low sanity causes visual and auditory hallucinations and an increased chance of attracting monsters, while its complete depletion results in a temporary drop in mobility, or death in higher difficulties. Light sources help restore sanity, and if none are available, Daniel may use tinderboxes to ignite candles and torches or deploy an oil-burning lantern. The number of tinderboxes and the amount of oil available are both limited, even more so in higher difficulties.

If a monster sees Daniel, it will chase him until he evades its sight. Daniel has no means of fighting monsters, so he must either avoid being seen, run away or hide. Daniel can withstand only a few attacks from a monster before he dies, which will cause the most recent save of the game to load. The player can restore Daniel's health by using laudanum found throughout the game. The player can hinder monsters by closing doors and building barricades from nearby objects. Monsters can destroy doors and knock over objects. Hiding in dark areas where monsters will not notice Daniel is also effective, but will decrease Daniel's sanity.

=== Hard Mode ===
Amnesia: The Dark Descent's Hard Mode was released for Xbox One and PC on 28 September 2018, in which several gameplay mechanics are altered to create a more challenging experience. Autosaving is disabled, requiring players to manually save, which costs four tinderboxes per save, making resource management even more crucial. Additionally, if the player's sanity reaches zero, they die.

Hard mode also reduces the availability of essential supplies, such as oil and tinderboxes, making it harder to maintain the player's lantern and save progress. Enemies, including the Gatherers, also become faster and deal more damage. Further, these monsters will spend more time searching for the player. Unlike in normal mode, there is no "danger music" to warn players when enemies are nearby.

== Plot ==
On 19 August 1839, a young man awakens in the dark and empty halls of Brennenburg Castle in Prussia with no memory about himself or his past. All he can remember is that his name is Daniel, that he lives in Mayfair, and that someone or something is hunting him. Shortly after regaining consciousness, Daniel finds a note he wrote to himself, which informs him that he has deliberately erased his own memory and is being hunted by a "Shadow", an unearthly presence that manifests itself through fleshy, acidic growths spreading throughout the castle. The note instructs Daniel to descend into the Inner Sanctum of the castle in order to find and kill its baron, Alexander.

As he makes his way through the castle, Daniel gradually learns both about its mysteries and about his own past, through notes and diaries he finds as well as through sudden flashbacks and visions. The origin of his situation is a mysterious orb that he recovered from the Tin Hinan Tomb in Algeria. When the orb was shattered, Daniel received a vision which enabled him to reassemble it, unleashing the Shadow in the process. Each of the experts he consulted in person about the orb were later found gruesomely dismembered. Disturbed by this, Daniel desperately exhausted all archaeological leads into strange orbs until contacted by Alexander, who summoned him to Brennenburg. There, Alexander informed him that the Shadow was slowly stalking him, killing everyone he came into contact with, and will not stop until it kills him as well. Alexander promised a means of repelling the Shadow by ritualistically coating the orb with a "vitae" substance, which could only be harvested from humans experiencing extreme pain and agony. Alexander's true purpose is to use Daniel's vitae-enriched orb to return to his native dimension, from which he was banished centuries prior. To achieve this end, Alexander and Daniel gathered vitae by torturing prisoners in the castle dungeons, many of whom were innocent people that Alexander claimed to be murderous criminals.

To maximize the production of vitae, the victims were forced to consume a potion that induced amnesia, so that they could never grow accustomed to their torment. Daniel slowly realized that the rituals were becoming less effective and the Shadow was getting ever closer. Desperate to survive, he became sadistic in his attempts to harvest vitae, and accidentally killed two escaping prisoners, a mother and her young daughter, in a fit of rage. Following the final ritual, Alexander sensed Daniel's guilt and declining faith in him and left him for dead as a result. Realizing how Alexander had manipulated him, Daniel swore revenge and consumed an amnesia potion in order to overcome his paralyzing guilt.

As Daniel nears the Inner Sanctum, he encounters Heinrich Cornelius Agrippa, a man who had once studied the orbs with his student Johann Weyer and has since been kept alive and imprisoned by Alexander, due to his extensive knowledge on the subject and as leverage against Weyer. He tells Daniel that Weyer stole Alexander's previous orb and harnessed its power to travel between dimensions. When Daniel asserts that he has learned to reassemble orbs, Agrippa instructs him to find his own shattered orb, which is needed to breach the Inner Sanctum. Agrippa also asks Daniel to take with him his head, which can be severed alive using a tonic invented by Weyer, and throw it into the inter-dimensional portal after Alexander opens it.

Once Daniel enters the Inner Sanctum, he finds Alexander preparing to open the portal. From here, there are three possible endings:

- If the player does nothing, Alexander enters the portal, leaving Daniel to be killed by the Shadow and descends into darkness, while Alexander tells him his sacrifice will be forever celebrated.
- If the player prevents the portal from opening by knocking over its support columns, the Shadow kills Alexander and spares Daniel, allowing him to leave the castle, content with his redemption.
- If the player throws Agrippa's head into the portal, the Shadow kills both Alexander and Daniel. In the darkness, Agrippa assures Daniel that everything will be alright, calling upon Weyer to help him.
- A secret fourth ending, similar to the one where Alexander escapes, can be obtained at an earlier point when Daniel is captured and imprisoned by Gatherers. If the player waits in the prison cell for an extended period of time, the Shadow will arrive and kill Daniel, with Alexander once more thanking him for his sacrifice.

=== Amnesia: Justine ===
The player takes control of an unnamed woman, who awakens with amnesia in a dungeon cell. A phonograph in the cell contains a recording by a woman named Justine, who tells the unnamed woman that she is the subject of a psychological test. The woman must overcome three puzzles to escape the dungeon. In each, she has the option of simply abandoning the puzzle and walking away, but doing so will cause an innocent victim to die. She is also pursued by the Suitors, three monstrous characters who turn out to be Justine's former paramours, now twisted by physical and psychological torture. After surviving the puzzle sections, the woman discovers a phonograph dangling from the ceiling, which causes the walls of the chamber to close in and threaten to crush the woman. She passes out, but awakens unharmed and begins to congratulate herself, revealing that the woman is Justine herself, who staged the entire experiment to see if she still had any compassion for humanity within herself. The ending sequence's dialogue differs depending on the number of people Justine had rescued.

== Development ==
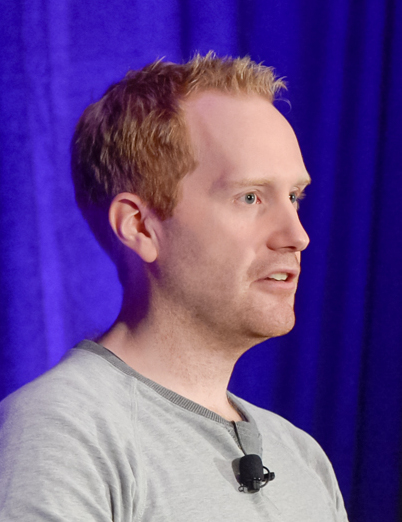
Frictional Games co-founder Thomas Grip (pictured in 2016) handled the game's development, including the game's sanity bar mechanic.

Work began on the game while Penumbra: Requiem was still being developed, with the company working on both projects at the same time. The game was first known under two working titles: Unknown and Lux Tenebras. It was not until 3 November 2009 that it was announced as its current title, Amnesia, and 13 November with the release of the game's website and a game trailer. Initial designs of the game varied considerably from the final game, with the developers interested in reintroducing more combat elements similar to those utilized in their first commercial title Penumbra: Overture. The developers soon discovered that they encountered many of the same problems and difficulties that plagued the combat in that game, and the design was further changed to be more similar to the style set out by Overture's sequel Penumbra: Black Plague.

On 5 February 2010, it was announced that the game had reached the alpha stage of development on all platforms. Two weeks later the developers released a new teaser trailer that showed actual gameplay footage, and the developers began accepting pre-orders for the game through their website. Also revealed was that the game was at that point being tested on all three intended platforms. It was also announced that the game would be released simultaneously for all of them in August 2010. This was later rescheduled, and the game was then expected to have an 8 September 2010 release. It was then later announced on 27 August 2010 that the game had officially gone Gold and would soon be ready for sale. On 3 September, the game's demo was released containing selected parts of the gameplay and story. It was then successfully released on 8 September 2010.

Frictional had revealed a release for extra content in the game if it had reached 2,000 pre-orders by the end of the pre-orders sake on 31 May 2010, and was achieved due to the success of Penumbra: Overture as the part of the first Humble Indie Bundle. The extra content was revealed to be commentary, and they explained in the comments section of the same page that its intended function was similar to that of Valve's commentary system that began in the Half-Life 2 series. The authors cite "Soul Made Flesh" by Carl Zimmer and older horror movies such as The Haunting as being inspirations for the mood and style of the game. Other critics have drawn parallels between the game's story and the writings of H. P. Lovecraft.

Thomas Grip, one of the game's main developers, would later write up a post-mortem of the game titled "The Terrifying Tale of Amnesia" for The Escapist, where he outlined in detail the process of the game's development, mostly focusing on its ever-changing design and the financial problems that plagued the developers for most of the game's development. A PlayStation 4 version – Amnesia Collection – was released on 22 November 2016 via PlayStation Network; this title includes The Dark Descent, its expansion Amnesia: Justine, and the sequel Amnesia: A Machine for Pigs. Just two days after its release on PS4, Frictional Games posted a tweet stating that the port managed to recoup all costs and "more". On 23 September 2020, it was announced that Amnesia: The Dark Descent would be made open source.

== Downloadable content ==
On 12 April 2011, Frictional Games released an extra free level for owners of the Steam version of Amnesia. This additional campaign is set apart from Brennenburg Castle. Justine was released on Steam as a way to promote the then-upcoming release of Portal 2, as getting 100% on the campaign (all of the collectables, all of the analysis and making correct choices) unlocks a message from the fictional company Aperture Science. The content was made available for all of the game's supported platforms and versions as part of the Amnesia v1.2 update on 17 May 2011.

It is possible to create custom stories for Amnesia that can then be loaded in the game. Various tools for the HPL Engine 2 have been released that allow the creation of unique levels, models, particle effects and materials, using an interface similar to Valve's Hammer Editing Software. Game logic can be implemented using the AngelScript scripting language. A prominent example of a custom story is Penumbra: Necrologue, a fan-made sequel to Frictional's earlier Penumbra series.

On 23 September 2020, Frictional Games announced that they would be releasing the source code for both Amnesia: The Dark Descent and Amnesia: A Machine For Pigs. Both games are available as open-source video games under GNU GPL-3.0-or-later.

== Reception ==
Reception

Aggregate score
Aggregator	Score
Metacritic	PC: 85/100

Review scores
Publication	Score
Adventure Gamers	4.5/5
Destructoid	9/10
Eurogamer	8/10
Game Informer	9.25/10
Gamekult	8/10
GameSpot	8.5/10
GameZone	7.5/10
IGN	8.5/10
Joystiq	4/5
MeriStation	6/10
PALGN	9/10
PC Gamer (UK)	88%
The Telegraph	9/10
Igromania	8/10

Amnesia: The Dark Descent received "generally favorable" reviews according to review aggregator website Metacritic. Josh Tolentino of Destructoid, Adam Biessener of Game Informer, and Bev Chen of PALGN saw Amnesia as a return to true survival horror, contrasting it with action-heavy titles like Resident Evil or Dead Space. Its focus on powerlessness and psychological horror was seen as a bold, influential move, with Ashton Raze of The Telegraph calling it a "masterwork of horror" and Al Bickham of PC Gamer noting its superiority to modern blockbusters.

Critics unanimously lauded Amnesia for its oppressive, terrifying atmosphere. The game's use of darkness, sound design, and minimalistic music was said to create a constant sense of dread. Biessener, Adventure Gamers's Nathaniel Berens, and IGN's Charles Onyett described it as one of the scariest games ever made, with moments that induce genuine panic and fear of the unknown. The game's lack of combat was widely appreciated as a bold choice, emphasizing vulnerability. Raze and Eurogamer's Quintin Smith noted that the inability to fight monsters heightens tension, forcing players to run or hide, which amplifies the horror. The sound design was a standout feature, with ambient noises like creaking doors, distant screams, and footsteps creating immersion. Berens and Raze particularly praised the audio for its role in sustaining unease, though Brian Rowe of GameZone noted some repetitive sound cues slightly diminish the effect over time.

The sanity mechanic, where prolonged exposure to darkness or monsters drains Daniel's mental stability, was universally praised for adding depth to the gameplay. Tolentino and Joystiq's Richard Mitchell highlighted the role of visual and auditory distortions in immersing players in Daniel's deteriorating psyche. The interplay between light and dark, where light preserves sanity but increases visibility and darkness offers safety but risks insanity, was regarded as a core strength. Bickham and Gamekult's Dr. Chocapic commended this risk-reward balance, noting its constant tension and strategic resource management.

The first-person, physics-based interaction system, inherited from Frictional's Penumbra series, was widely appreciated for its immersive quality. Berens, Raze, and GameSpot's Brett Todd noted that actions like opening doors or manipulating objects with realistic mouse gestures enhance the tactile experience. Mitchell mentioned occasional frustration with controls during panicked moments. Smith and MeriStation's Ramón Méndez González found the puzzles simple yet satisfying, fitting the game's focus on exploration over complex brainteasers. Rowe noted inconsistencies, such as interactive objects not always being clearly distinguishable.

The story was praised for its literary influences, drawing comparisons to Poe, Shelley, and Lovecraft; González specifically cited passages of Lovecraft's "The Outsider" as a possible primary inspiration for the game's story. Berens and Biessener highlighted the engaging backstory revealed through notes and flashbacks, which pulls players forward despite fear. The narrative's resolution was a point of criticism. Berens, Tolentino, and Smith noted that the climax feels vague or unsatisfying, with multiple endings lacking closure. González pointed out that the slow, fragmented storytelling is effective for immersion but can leave players confused.

The game's technical aspects were considered solid despite some limitations. The graphics were generally praised for their detailed environments and moody lighting, especially given the game's indie budget. Berens and Chen noted the castle's hauntingly beautiful design, though Dr. Chocapic and González mentioned that brighter areas expose the engine's limitations, with dated character models and textures. The voice acting received mixed feedback. Tolentino praised Sam Mowry's performance as Alexander but found Daniel's delivery too calm, while Smith and Bickham noted occasional weaknesses in vocal delivery.

Critics emphasized the game's immersive quality, enhanced by the developers' recommendation to play in the dark with headphones. Berens, Onyett, and Mitchell strongly endorsed this setup for maximizing terror. González noted that the game's experimental nature and lack of combat make it niche, appealing primarily to horror fans willing to embrace its slow pacing and oppressive atmosphere. Its short length, estimated at 6-10 hours, was seen as appropriate for its intensity, though Smith suggested more varied horror set-pieces could have enhanced it.

== Sales and accolades ==
Frictional Games did show some trepidation over the game's initial sales after the first week, but were encouraged by continued sales throughout the first month after the game's release, with Frictional recouping all the expenses from creating Amnesia by early October 2010. By the beginning of January 2011 the developer reported that nearly 200,000 units had been sold, declaring in response that "With these figures at hand, we must confess that it gives us new confidence for the PC." The game kept gaining sales and in July 2011 it had sold almost 350,000 units. At the 2011 Independent Games Festival Amnesia won awards for both "Excellence in Audio" and "Technical Excellence" along with the "Direct2Drive Vision Award" which included a $10,000 prize.

A year after the original release of Amnesia, the developers revealed that they had sold around 391,102 units and were continuing to sell about 6,000 units per month. They also released details about how much money each platform generated for them by analyzing the sales from their online store, with 70% of sales coming from Windows users and 15% coming from users of Linux and another 15% coming from users of Mac OS X. Frictional did state that their store was the only place anyone could purchase the Linux version of the game, whereas the Mac OS X and Windows versions could be purchased from other sources, meaning that the total percentage of Linux sales is actually considerably smaller compared to other platforms taken collectively. Observing that their own Mac OS X sales did not go down from their own store even as services like Steam picked up the game for that platform, meaning that it did not steal customers from their store but instead opened up a new market, they decided this makes a good incentive for other stores to support Linux as well. As of September 2012, the game sits at an estimated 1.4 million sales.

In 2011, Adventure Gamers named Amnesia the 34th-best adventure game ever released. In 2015, Kotaku originally ranked Amnesia as the 2nd best horror game of all time, beaten only by P.T., but moved it to 1st after P.T. was removed by Konami. In 2017, GamesRadar+ ranked Amnesia as the 3rd best horror game of all time, although in a revised list in 2018, moved the game down to 13th place. In 2018, The A.V. Club ranked Amnesia as the 7th greatest horror game of all time in a list of 35. The Washington Post cited it as one of the most "influential games of the decade".

== Legacy ==
An indirect sequel called Amnesia: A Machine for Pigs was released on 10 September 2013, developed by The Chinese Room and published by Frictional Games. It takes place in the same universe as The Dark Descent, but in an alternative history with different characters.

The third game in the series, titled Amnesia: Rebirth was announced on 6 March 2020. Rebirth is the second Amnesia game to be developed by Frictional Games. A gameplay reveal trailer was uploaded on 2 October 2020 to a positive reception. The game was released on 20 October 2020 for PlayStation 4, Linux and Windows.

Amnesia: The Bunker, developed by Frictional Games, was released on 6 June 2023.
