= Umbers =

Umbers is a surname. Notable people with the surname include:

- Arthur Umbers (1919–1945), New Zealand Second World War flying ace
- Geoff Umbers (1933–2014), Australian rules footballer
- Mark Umbers (born 1973), English actor
- Richard Umbers (bishop) (born 1971), auxiliary bishop-elect of the Roman Catholic Archdiocese of Sydney
- Richard Umbers (footballer) (born 1968), former Australian rules footballer
