= Tom Jubert =

British video game writer and narrative designer

- Born: 1985 (age 40–41)
- Occupations: Video game writer, narrative designer
- Website: sites.google.com/site/tjubert

Tom Jubert (born 1985) is a British video game writer and narrative designer. He is best known for his work on many high-profile games, including Subnautica, FTL: Faster than Light, The Talos Principle, and The Swapper. Although he has worked on AAA games, most of his work has been on smaller indie titles.

== Biography ==
Jubert went to the University of Southampton, where he did one year of computer science before changing majors to English and philosophy, graduating best-in-class in 2007. He also holds an MA in philosophy from King's College London.

In 2007, Jubert received his first writing job in the game industry, writing the story of Penumbra: Overture, as well as voicing the protagonist Philip. In 2008, he wrote the sequels as well, Penumbra: Black Plague, for which he was nominated for a Writer's Guild of Great Britain award, and Penumbra: Requiem. Despite the fact that the games' stories were positively received, he stated that, looking back on the game, he believed that it was "far too text-heavy", as the bulk of the story was communicated via diary entries.

In 2009, Jubert wrote and developed the text adventure Ir/rational, which was originally a minigame from the Penumbra series. It was later followed in 2012 by Ir/rational Redux, and in 2013 by Ir/rational Investigator. These games were described as logical deduction games with witty writing and humor.

In 2010, Jubert worked as a narrative designer on the game Driver: San Francisco, as well as localizing the script of Lost Horizon for a western release. In 2012, he wrote the story for the game FTL: Faster than Light. In 2013, he wrote The Swapper, and in 2014, The Talos Principle. That year, he was included in Develop Online's "30 Under 30", which mentioned that he was described by Rhianna Pratchett as one of the game industry's best up-and-coming writers. In 2015, he wrote a new story mode for the game The Masterplan prior to the game's release from Steam Early Access. The same year, he was also hired to add a story to the game Subnautica while the game was in Early Access.

== Game writing credits ==
- The Talos Principle 2 (2023)
- Subnautica: Below Zero (2019)
- Subnautica (2014)
- The Talos Principle (2014)
- FTL: Faster Than Light (2012)
- Binary Domain (2012)
- Driver: San Francisco (2011)
- Penumbra: Black Plague (2008)
- Penumbra: Overture (2007)
