= Amnesia: Rebirth =

2020 video game

- Developer: Frictional Games
- Publishers: Frictional Games; Abylight Studios (Switch)
- Directors: Fredrik Olsson; Thomas Grip
- Designer: Patrik Dekhla
- Programmer: Peter Wester
- Artist: Rasmus Gunnarsson
- Writer: Ian Thomas
- Composer: Mikko Tarmia
- Series: Amnesia
- Platforms: Linux; Windows; PlayStation 4; Amazon Luna; Xbox One; Xbox Series X/S; Nintendo Switch 2
- Release: 20 October 2020: Linux, Windows, PS4; 20 October 2020; Luna; 22 October 2021; Xbox One, Xbox Series X/S; 20 October 2022; Switch 2; 30 April 2026
- Genre: Survival horror
- Mode: Single-player

Amnesia: Rebirth is a 2020 survival horror video game developed and published by Frictional Games. It was released for Windows, Linux, and PlayStation 4 on 20 October 2020, for Amazon Luna on 22 October 2021, and for Xbox One and Xbox Series X/S on 20 October 2022. A version for Nintendo Switch 2 was released on 30 April 2026. It is the third installment in the franchise and serves as a sequel to Amnesia: The Dark Descent (2010). The game received generally favorable reviews.

== Gameplay ==
Like The Dark Descent, the game is played from a first-person perspective. The player assumes control of Tasi Trianon, who must wander through desert caves and ancient tombs in order to find the whereabouts of her companions. The game is dimly lit, and players must use light sources, such as Tasi's own fuel lamp, to see clearly and find ways to progress. Players can also scavenge matches, which can be used to light up mounted torches and candles. Players also need to solve various puzzles to progress in the game, and read the notes left by non-player characters to know more about the story.

As in the first game, Tasi's fear level builds up gradually. Fear overwhelms Tasi when she walks completely in the dark, causing her to hallucinate and hear whispers in her head. Grotesque images also pop up on the screen. Solving puzzles, hiding from monsters, and managing light sources can control her fear, preventing such from happening. The game does not feature any combat system and when Tasi encounters a supernatural creature, she can either run or hide. Unlike the first game, when the player is killed, the game will not reload an earlier save point. Instead, it will bring the player a bit forward, allowing the player to skip the monster encounter entirely during the player's second attempt.

== Plot ==
The game is set in March 1937, and follows Anastasie "Tasi" Trianon, a French drafter on an expedition in colonial Africa. After her plane crash-lands in Algeria, she wakes up to discover that her companions are missing, with no recollection of what happened. Following the trail of her expedition, Tasi realizes that she is pregnant and has come into possession of a Traveler's Amulet, an alien device that allows her to travel to an alien world. During this time, she finds her husband Salim's corpse, having died from the crash.

Tasi reaches an abandoned French fort and discovers an unknown force has slaughtered its garrison. She contacts an expedition survivor, Dr. Metzier, who instructs her to head to a nearby village. Tasi travels under the fort and encounters mutated ghouls that stalk the tunnels. She makes her way out but is caught in a cave-in and falls into ancient ruins that belonged to a highly advanced, but now extinct, society. As she studies the ruins, Tasi learns that the facility was built by an alien race dubbed the Gate Builders, who could traverse worlds and extend their lives thanks to vitae, a substance obtained by torturing humans on a mass scale. A failed plot to end the suffering caused the Gate on their homeworld to destroy itself, wiping out the Gate Builders and spreading the Shadow, a dangerous force that manifests in red tumor-like growths. Tasi also comes across signs of a previous expedition led by Professor Herbert. To her horror, Tasi discovers that one of her expedition members, Leon, has been turned into a ghoul. She later rescues another expedition member, Richard, but kills him in a rage when he attempts to leave her to die.

Tasi activates a teleporter in the ruins to transport herself to the village, but finds it deserted and goes into labor. She encounters expedition member Yasmin, who in the process of turning into a ghoul had killed the villagers. Metzier arrives and kills Yasmin. Tasi enters labor, assisted by Metzier, and gives birth to a girl, Amari. Metzier takes Amari, claiming she is needed to reverse the curse causing them to become ghouls. Tasi chases after Metzier, who uses the Traveler's Amulet to travel to the Gate Builders' world.

During the pursuit, Tasi recovers her memories. Shortly after the plane crash, the Empress of the Gate Builders approached the expedition and brought them to the Gate Builders' world. The Empress, longing to be a mother after vitae treatment for an affliction rendered her infertile, gave them the Traveler's Amulet and promised to save them if Tasi gave her Amari. Tasi, still traumatized by the loss of her previous daughter Alys, refused. The Empress then tricked the expedition into drinking from a fountain that inflicted the curse, before sending them back to Earth.

Tasi catches up to Metzier and kills him. The Empress warns Tasi that Amari is afflicted with the same illness that killed Alys. She pleads with Tasi to allow Amari to stay with her, as she can provide vitae to Amari to suppress her illness, allowing her to live a full life. Tasi is left with three choices.

- If Tasi leaves Amari behind, the Empress commends her for making the right choice and turns Tasi into a ghoul. Tasi roams the ruins of the Gate Builders' world with fragmented memories of Amari. This ending is also achieved if the player is captured by the Empress during the final section of the game.
- If Tasi decides to fight the Empress, she injects the flesh of the Shadow into the Empress' vitae supply, killing the Empress and ending the Gate Builders' civilization. While this euthanizes the humans being tortured for their vitae, both Tasi and Amari are consumed by the Shadow's growth and perish.
- If Tasi decides to flee with Amari, she activates a teleporter that sends her and Amari to Paris and beyond the Empress' reach, with both of them facing an uncertain future.

== Development ==
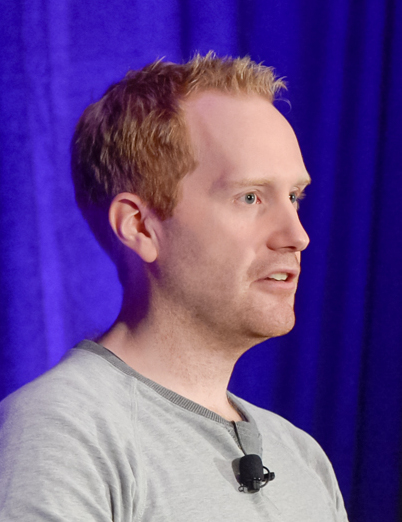
Thomas Grip, the game's director and the co-founder of Frictional Games

Amnesia: Rebirth was developed by Frictional Games. It was their first Amnesia game since The Dark Descent in 2010 and their first game since Soma in 2015. While in development, the team attempted to identify the strengths and the shortcomings of The Dark Descent and Soma, and decided that Rebirth would keep Soma's focus of having an overarching narrative, and Amnesia's "lower-level gameplay". The team chose to return to the Amnesia franchise because they felt that it would shorten the game's development cycle, as the team only need to refine the franchise's established elements without having the need to start anew. The team also felt that Amnesia could expand to many other settings, as indicated by the in-game notes in the original games. Despite this, the game is not a direct sequel to The Dark Descent. Players do not need to play the first game in order to understand the stories, but the game would have a lot more connections with the original game than Amnesia: A Machine for Pigs, which was developed externally by The Chinese Room.

According to Thomas Grip, the game's creative director, the game explores the idea of "survival". Instead of relying on short-term scares, the team believed that the game's overarching theme and narrative should be what haunts the player. The team chose a desert setting as the game's main setting, as it allows the team to create more diverse environments, and allows players to appreciate moments of beauty and spectacle, which can then be used to contrast the more claustrophobic areas and the sense of dread the game hopes to deliver. Skeletons on the Zahara served as a major source of inspiration for the team. Learning from their experiences creating Soma, the game story unfolds as the player progresses, unlike in The Dark Descent whose story is mostly delivered through text-based collectibles and focuses entirely on the past.

Frictional Games announced Rebirth on 6 March 2020. The game was released for Windows, Linux and PlayStation 4 on 20 October 2020. It was then released for Amazon Luna on 22 October 2021. Versions for Xbox One and Xbox Series X/S were released on 20 October 2022.

In January 2025, publisher Abylight Studios announced a collaboration with developer Frictional Games to bring three of their most recent games (Soma, Amnesia: The Bunker, and Amnesia: Rebirth) to the Nintendo Switch.

== Reception ==
Reception

Aggregate scores
Aggregator	Score
Metacritic	PC: 80/100; PS4: 75/100
OpenCritic	70% recommend

Review scores
Publication	Score
Game Informer	7.5/10
GameSpot	8/10
GamesRadar+	4.5/5
IGN	8/10
PC Gamer (US)	91/100
Push Square	4/10
Shacknews	9/10
The Guardian	3/5

Amnesia: Rebirth received "generally favorable" reviews, according to review aggregator website Metacritic. Fellow review aggregator OpenCritic assessed that the game received strong approval, being recommended by 70% of critics.

Ben Reeves of Game Informer noted that "Praising Amnesia: Rebirth as a horror experience is easy", specifically noting the "superb environmental design and sound work". As a game, however, it comes up short in a lot of areas" specifically noting the puzzles ruined the tension of the game and that the goals of the game are often unclear with maze-like rooms that make you easily miss your target. Phil Hornshaw of GameSpot echoed this statement, stating that "none of the puzzles are especially difficult, it's definitely possible to get stalled here and there as you search for a solution that's not immediately intuitive." Hornshaw declared that the game was "at its best when Tasi's personal journey intersects with the supernatural goings-on as it explores the responsibilities of motherhood." while noting "the game delivers the illusion of more agency than it actually offers--there are only a couple of big choices along the way and it's not clear they actually make much difference in terms of how the story unfolds."

Rick Lane of The Guardian described the game as "an ambitious tale that invokes body horror, cosmic horror, and themes of colonialism, as well as mental-health traumas such as bereavement and loss of sanity" but found the story suffered from thinly drawn out secondary characters, specifically noting that "Tasi's maudlin relationship with Salim is a particular weak point." The review concluded that the game's combination of "light puzzle-solving with evading the twitching creatures who lurk in the game's oppressive darkness, and though the puzzles are intelligently constructed (a lengthy sequence set in an abandoned Foreign Legion fortress is a highlight), they lack the elaborate tactility of Frictional's masterful sci-fi horror, Soma."

In a more critical review, Liam Croft from Push Square wrote that it was a disappointing follow-up to Soma from Frictional Games. He added that while the setting was interesting, he found the story to be unsatisfying. He further criticized the gameplay for being rudimentary, adding that "this hide and seek style of gameplay has long outstayed its welcome".
