= The Swapper =

2013 video game

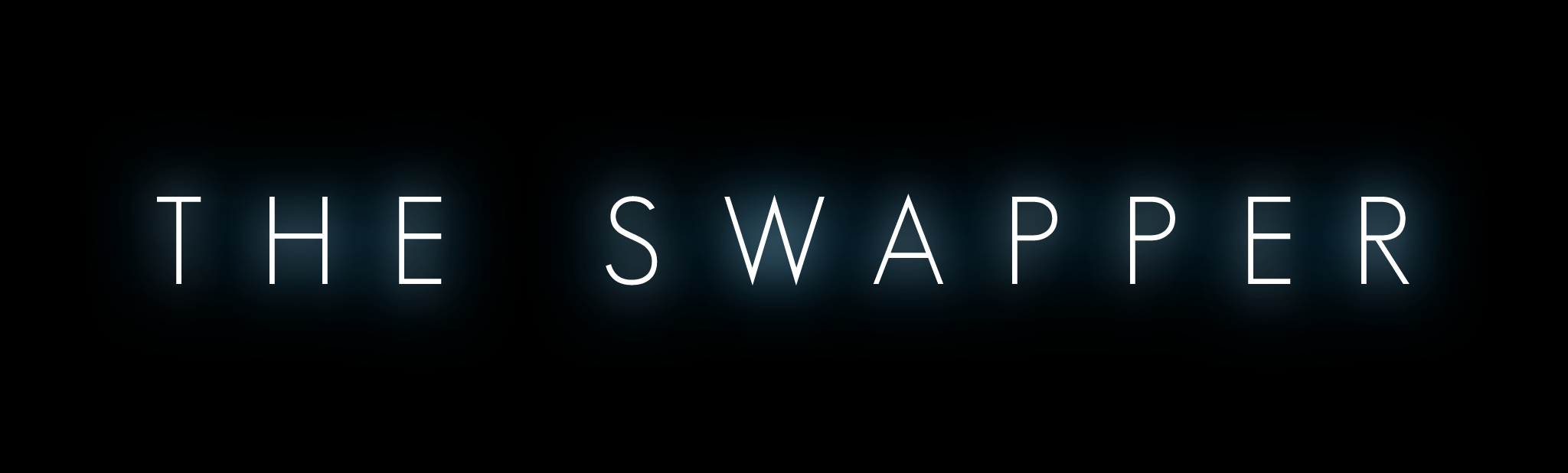
- Developers: Facepalm Games; Curve Studios (Console Ports)
- Publisher: Facepalm Games; Curve Digital (Console Ports): JP: Nintendo (Wii U)
- Designer: Olli Harjola
- Programmer: Olli Harjola
- Artist: Olli Harjola
- Writer: Tom Jubert
- Composer: Carlo Castellano
- Platforms: Windows; Mac OS X; Linux; PlayStation 3; PlayStation 4; PlayStation Vita; Wii U; Xbox One
- Release: Windows: WW: 30 May 2013; Mac, Linux: WW: 18 February 2014; PlayStation 3 / 4 / Vita: NA: 5 August 2014; EU: 6 August 2014; Wii U: NA: 6 November 2014; EU: 6 November 2014; JP: 2 April 2015; Xbox One: WW: 5 June 2015
- Genres: Puzzle-platform, Metroidvania
- Mode: Single-player

The Swapper is a 2013 puzzle-platform game. A science fiction-themed title, the player controls a scavenger stranded aboard an abandoned research station, and discovers the strange titular device, which allows her to create clones of herself and switch her consciousness between these clones. The player uses this ability to solve various puzzles and learn about the fate of the station's researchers. The game's plot explores philosophical themes including the nature of consciousness, identity, telepathy, and the mind–body problem, with two of its main characters named after famous philosophers Daniel Dennett and David Chalmers.

The Swapper was developed by Facepalm Games, an independent developer in Helsinki, Finland, and released on May 30, 2013, for Microsoft Windows, Mac OS X, and Linux. It was ported to PlayStation and Nintendo by Curve Studios in 2014. The game was released to critical acclaim, with reviewers praising the game's visual style and atmosphere, puzzle quality, and innovative mechanics.

== Gameplay ==
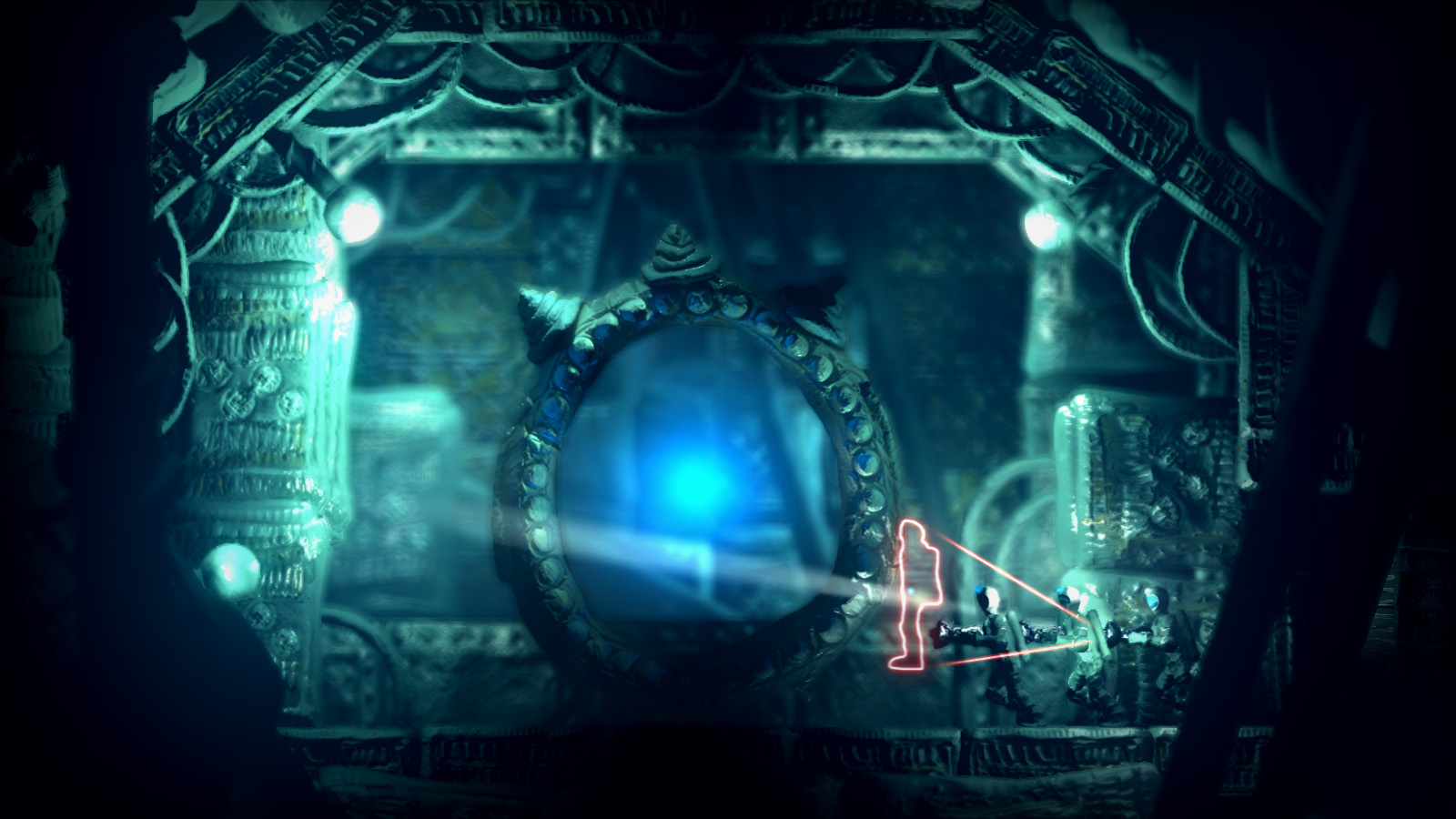
The Swapper's art assets were modelled in clay and then digitized for the game.

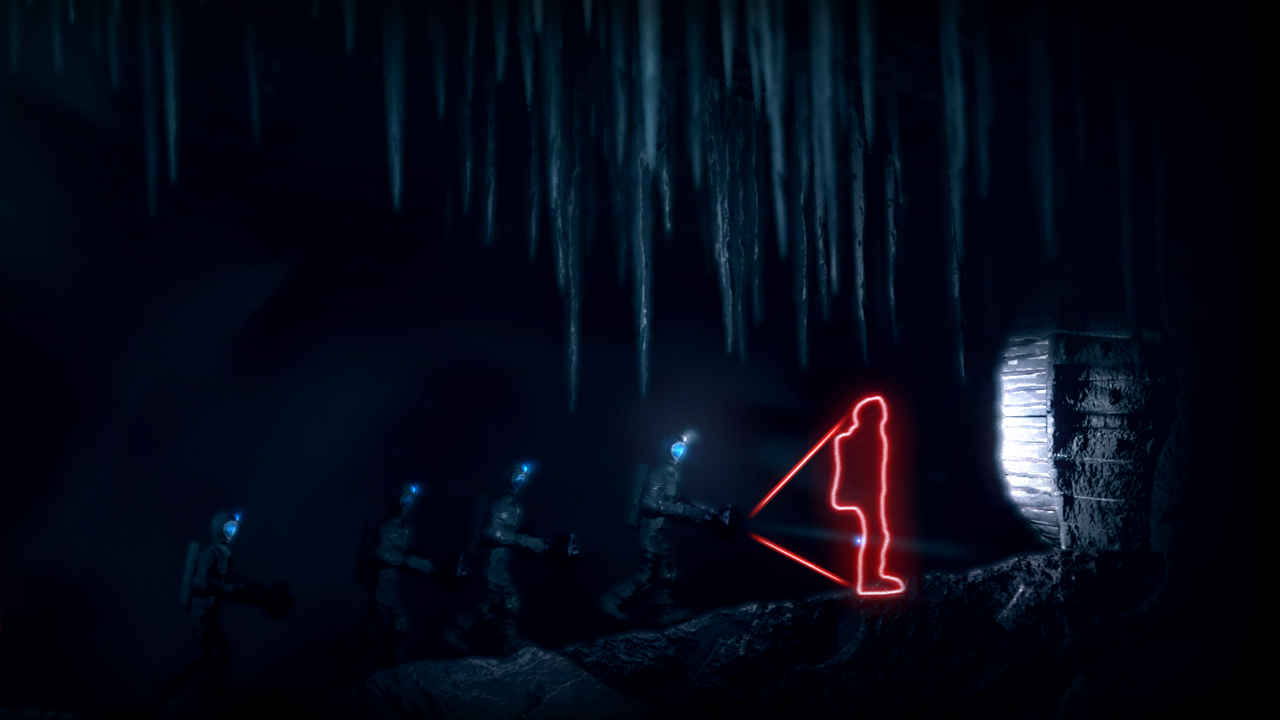
The player character and their clones

The Swapper is a side-scrolling puzzle-platformer in a science fiction setting. The player character is stranded on a damaged space station and is looking for a means to escape. To do so, they must explore the station and find orbs that are used to activate certain doors, allowing them to progress further into the game. The game uses some concepts of "Metroidvania" games in which the player may have to backtrack through the facility, divided into a number of rooms, to proceed within the game.

The player acquires a hand-held cloning tool early in the game through which they solve puzzles to collect orbs. The tool offers two functions: the ability to create up to four simultaneous clones of the player character, and the ability to swap control to any of these clones as long as they are within line of sight. Once created, the clones will move with the player unless otherwise blocked by the environment; for example, if the player moves left, all the clones will move left unless they run into a wall. This allows the player to complete complex steps to activate doors and switches as to acquire the orbs. Like the player, clones can die falling from a large height or through other environmental hazards. Clones are reclaimed if they die or if they physically move into the same space as the player. When using the cloning tool, time slows down, allowing the player to execute more difficult maneuvers involving the clones. One example is to scale a vertical area by repeating the process of creating a clone higher than the currently active clone and immediately swapping control to the new clone while it is falling in mid-air, until a safe platform at the top of the area can be reached by a clone. Later levels include sections of the station where gravity has been reversed, increasing the difficulty of the puzzles.

The cloning functionality is limited by certain light sources. Blue lights will prevent clones from being created in the illuminated area, while red lights will block the control swapping ability; purple lights block both actions. Touching certain white lights, moving off the current stage, or touching another clone will otherwise destroy those clones.

== Plot ==
Humanity has exhausted its natural resources, and seven remote outposts are established in distant space to extract and synthesize useful materials from their neighbouring planets, to send back to Earth. The crews of the space stations must survive independently off Earth for several decades. First, Station 7 loses orbit and disintegrates into its closest sun, then Station 6 goes offline for unknown reasons.

When the crew of Theseus explore an uninhabitable desert planet called Chori V, with abundant natural mineral deposits, they find a more durable steel amalgam, an alien life form similar to Earth's silkworm, and highly complex rock formations of unknown origin. The rocks display unusual electro-chemical activity, leading some to believe they may possess rudimentary intelligence. The crew call these rocks 'The Watchers'.

Over time, the crew begins to notice that the rocks are penetrating their dreams and comes to believe that the rocks are telepathic. The scientists use what they learned from the rocks' electro-chemicals to create a device they call 'The Swapper'. They learn that this device creates clones of the user, and allows them to become the clone. A failed attempt at swapping two different people, which causes such massive memory loss as to make it impossible to know if either person was actually swapped, leads to a ban on person-to-person swapping. One of the crew, Dr. Chalmers, circumvents the ban by performing brain transplants on terminally-ill patients and keeping their brains alive. She believes she can use the swapper directly on the transplanted brains, and swap the person's consciousness into a body, prolonging their life. Her colleague, Dr. Dennett, disagrees with this practice on ethical grounds.

As time goes by and the scientists learn that the Watchers are millions of years old, they are believed to be much more intelligent than previously thought, perhaps even more intelligent than humans themselves.

The first Watcher to be found mysteriously resembles the shape of a human face, with eyes, a nose, a mouth and ornately carved decorations. It exhibits far more neurological activity than the other Watchers. The scientists hypothesize that it acts as a communications hub for the rest of the Watchers. They record radioactivity from the Head Watcher, but deem it safe enough for the crew to be around. However, members of the crew begin dying, and areas of the ship are deemed uninhabitable. The crew barricaded themselves inside one area of the ship, thinking something must have followed them back from the planet's surface. It soon becomes clear that the Watchers are causing the deaths. People report being able to hear the Watchers' thoughts. Those who do die shortly afterward. By the time the crew realize the cause of the deaths, it is too late. They have brought on board too many watchers, they would never be able to jettison them all into space and off the station.

The player, a Scavenger, arrives at the station via an escape pod and hears a woman on the radio who alternates between berating them and asking for their assistance. The plot is slowly revealed through messages on data terminals and the Watchers on the station. Eventually the Scavenger is told by the woman to use the Swapper on the Head Watcher to prevent further deaths, but appears to quickly change her mind and instructs them to instead detach the Solar panels so that the station can land on the planet below.

In the last sequence, the woman plays a video to another Scavenger revealing a twist. To survive, Dennet and Chalmers transferred their consciousness into brains on life-support within a sealed section of the ship in order to await rescue for decades. This other Scavenger arrived on the station and confronted them about what had happened on the station. To prove what had transpired Chalmers encouraged the other Scavenger to try the Swapper. The other Scavenger did so and in confusion sent a Swapper-made clone of herself into space via an escape pod. Left with few options, since the other Scavenger's ship is broken and the Watchers will consume them in the now-unprotected ship section within hours and the rescue team will take one day to arrive, Chalmers suggested swapping minds with the other Scavenger to find a solution. Before the video cuts out, the other Scavenger prepares to use the device on Chalmers' brain.

Moments later the player Scavenger confronts the other Scavenger whose body is revealed to have the consciousnesses of Dennet and Chalmers in addition to her own, which explains why she appeared to argue with herself. Dennet wished to land the station (in order to return the Watchers to the planet) while Chalmers wished to use the Swapper on the Head Watcher. The consciousness of the other Scavenger, fed up with their arguing, uses the Swapper on the Head Watcher and her body appears to die. The player Scavenger completes the station landing and exits onto the planet surface. Watchers on the surface begin to express the thoughts of the three human females who inhabited the other Scavenger, suggesting that their consciousnesses merged with the watcher collective when they used the swapper on the Head Watcher. From across a chasm the player Scavenger is met by a rescue team member, Marcus, who scans the Scavenger as a precaution and radios for quarantine procedures. Unfortunately, the ship's Captain responds that they do not have the quarantine facilities onboard meaning that the player must be left behind. Marcus apologizes and turns to leave. Here the player is presented with two options:

If the player chooses to swap, they switch bodies and commit a murder of Marcus, who falls to his death in the Scavenger's body. The player, in Marcus's body, makes a way to the rescue ship and is treated with suspicion by another female crew member, but the Captain ignores the concern and pulls the ship into orbit.

If the player chooses to stay on the planet, they fall down the chasm and are spoken to by the Watchers, who express that although the death is unknown, they imply that the player will be allowed to maintain the identity in their collective, at least for a while.

== Development ==
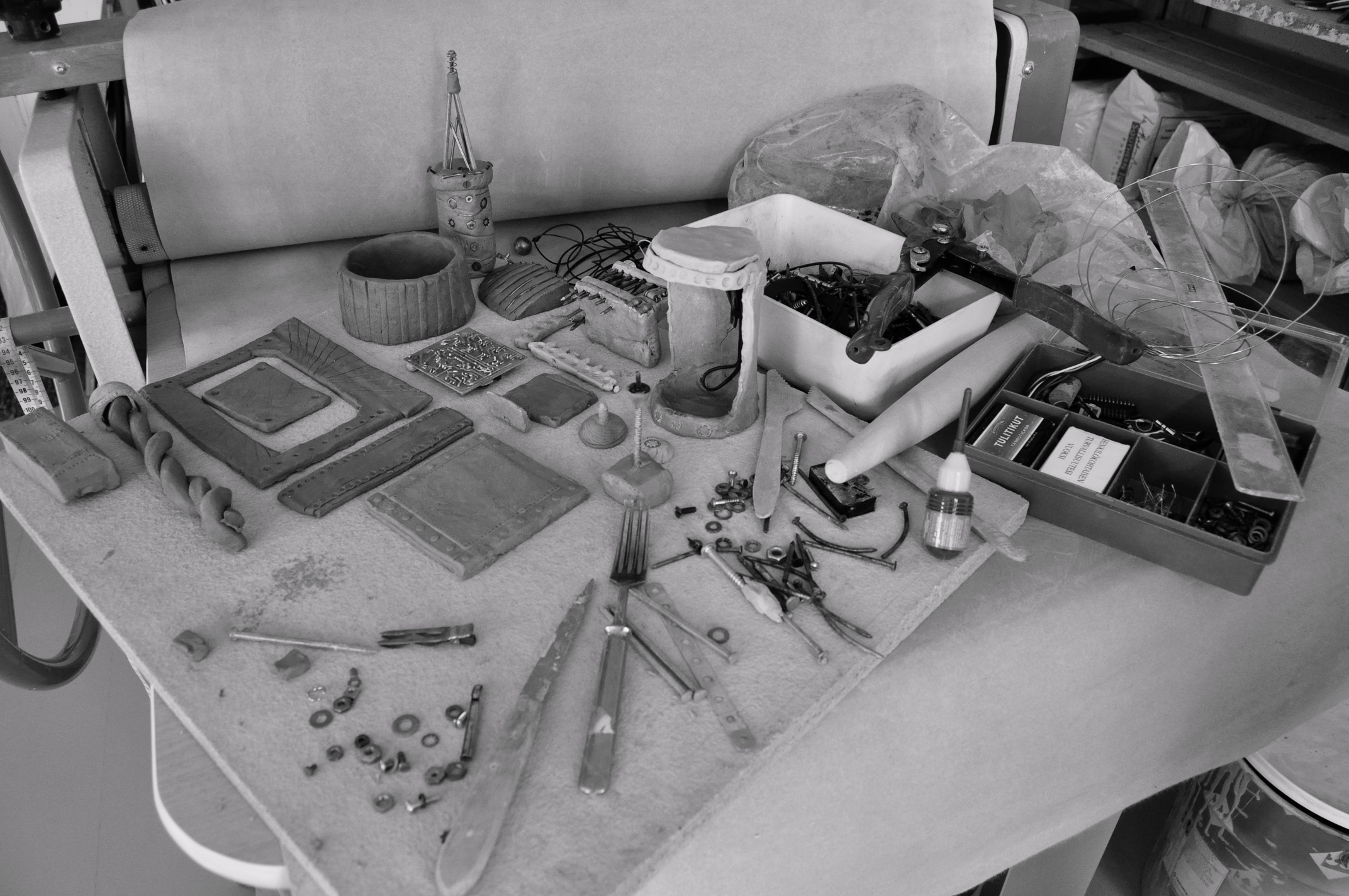
A selection of the game's art assets in their original clay form

The Swapper was a project made by two University of Helsinki students Otto Hantula and Olli Harjola in their spare time. The Swapper was backed by the Indie Fund, the 6th indie game title the fund has supported. Rather than digital textures, the game features handcrafted art assets and clay which forms the various game levels.

Curve Studios helped to port the title to the PlayStation 3, PlayStation 4, and PlayStation Vita platforms, with an expected release date in May 2014. After being delayed to ensure the PlayStation 3 and PlayStation Vita versions are "up to scratch", the game was released on 5 August 2014 in North America and the following day in Europe. Curve Studios later announced that they will bring the game to Wii U, the graphical capability will be on par with PC version. Subsequently, after the game's release on Wii U, Nintendo assisted in bringing The Swapper to the Japanese market, and they announced this during the Japanese version of the April 2015 Nintendo Direct presentation.

== Reception ==
Reception

Aggregate scores
| Aggregator | Score |
|---|---|
| GameRankings | 88.09% |
| Metacritic | (PC) 87/100 (PSV) 86/100 (PS4) 83/100 (WIIU) 83/100 (XONE) 92/100 |

Review scores
| Publication | Score |
|---|---|
| Destructoid | 10/10 |
| Edge | 7/10 |
| Game Informer | 9.25/10 |
| GameSpot | 8/10 |
| IGN | 9.3/10 |
| ComboGamer | 80% |

The Swapper received positive reviews from critics. It has an aggregate score of 88.09% on GameRankings and 87/100 on Metacritic. The game has won numerous awards including Best International Game at Freeplay 2011 and Special Recognition Award at Indiecade 2011.

== See also ==
- List of puzzle video games
- Philosophical fiction
- Philosophy of mind
