= Amnesia: The Bunker =

2023 video game

- Developer: Frictional Games
- Publishers: Frictional Games; Abylight Studios (Switch)
- Directors: Fredrik Olsson; Thomas Grip
- Designer: Max Lidbeck
- Programmers: Edvin Grafe; Peter Wester
- Artist: Rasmus Gunnarsson
- Writer: Philip Gelatt
- Composer: Mikko Tarmia
- Series: Amnesia
- Platforms: PlayStation 4; Windows; Xbox One; Xbox Series X/S; Nintendo Switch
- Release: June 6, 2023: PS4, Windows, Xbox One, Xbox Series X/S; June 6, 2023; Switch; TBA
- Genre: Survival horror
- Mode: Single-player

Amnesia: The Bunker is a 2023 survival horror video game developed and published by Frictional Games. The fourth installment in the Amnesia series and a prequel to Amnesia: Rebirth (2020), the game follows a French soldier who is trapped in a bunker with a monster and must find a way to escape. It was released for Windows, PlayStation 4, Xbox One and Xbox Series X/S on June 6, 2023. It received generally positive reviews from critics.

== Gameplay ==
In many areas of Amnesia: The Bunker, the player's only source of illumination is a small dynamo flashlight held in Henri's left hand. The Beast's limb stretches out from a hole in the wall in front of Henri.

Amnesia: The Bunker, like its predecessor, is a first-person survival horror video game. The game is set in World War I, and the player assumes control of French soldier Henri Clément. Henri is trapped in an underground bunker and hunted by a mysterious but photosensitive monster named "the Beast". To survive in the bunker, Henri must maintain the base's power while collecting resources and ammo, which are randomly placed in the game's map. Henri can also use a revolver, a shotgun, and other throwable items such as grenades and flares to fight against enemies, but ammo is very scarce. The base is dimly lit, and Henri is eventually equipped with a watch that indicates when the generators will run out of fuel. If the fuel runs out, the base will become completely dark and the monster will actively hunt Henri. To solve the problem, the player needs to refuel the generator, and use a noisy dynamo flashlight to find his way in the bunker. There are limited amounts of fuel in the bunker, and once all supplies are used up, the player will have to complete the rest of their playthrough in the dark.

Unlike previous Amnesia games, the game features a "semi-open world", one that gives players more freedom to explore and approach their objectives. The game does not feature many scripted moments, and the Beast is an ever-present threat that haunts Henri throughout the game. The game features elements inspired by immersive sims, and the game's world will respond to the player's action. For instance, players can pour gasoline on the floor and ignite it, creating a temporary light source to scare the monster. Players can enter various safe rooms regularly in order to save the game, one of which has a chest to store items, and view a map of the bunker to better understand its layout. Subsections of the map are filled in as those sections are found/viewed. Unlike previous games in the series, The Bunker does not feature a sanity mechanic.

== Plot ==
In the year 1916, France and Germany are in the midst of World War I. French soldier Henri Clément heads out into No Man's Land in search of his friend Augustin Lambert, who has gone missing during a patrol. Henri finds Lambert trapped in a large crater. He has Lambert drink from the water he finds inside the crater to revive him, and attempts to carry Lambert to safety. However, they are spotted by the Germans and Henri is knocked unconscious by an artillery shell blast.

Henri wakes up some time later inside a seemingly abandoned bunker with no memory of how he ended up there. He quickly finds a surviving soldier, Albert Boisrond, who informs him that the bunker has been sealed off, and instructs him to find dynamite and a detonator to reopen the exit and begs for Henri to kill him. Boisrond is attacked and killed by a strange creature shortly after. Exploring the bunker further, Henri learns that some unknown Beast had appeared out of nowhere and has been terrorizing the bunker, slaughtering the French garrison one by one. The bunker's cowardly officers fled, caving in the only exit to seal the Beast inside, but trapping the soldiers left behind. With no other choice, Henri searches the bunker complex for dynamite and a detonator. During his search, he comes across more clues left behind by the soldiers and he begins to piece together the events that led to this situation.

Some time ago, the bunker garrison discovered an underground tunnel dating back to Ancient Rome. They began to excavate the tunnel with the intention of using it to stage a surprise attack on German lines, but some of the soldiers began suffering hallucinations and vivid nightmares about ritualistic torture, monsters fighting to the death, and extradimensional architecture. Fearing that the tunnel actually led to Hell, a group of soldiers sabotaged the excavation with dynamite in an attempt to seal the tunnel. The saboteurs were subsequently court-martialed, and the excavation was indefinitely delayed.

Meanwhile, Henri and Lambert gambled with dice to determine which of them would go out on patrol one evening; Henri, still smarting from a series of pranks played by his friend, cheated with a sleight-of-hand trick, causing Lambert to lose. Guilt-stricken when Lambert failed to return, Henri left the bunker in search of his friend. Later, Lambert brought back a wounded and comatose Henri; oddly, Lambert was completely unscathed. It is revealed that the water Lambert drank originated from the tunnel and was part of the ancient rituals; it began to slowly mutate him and drive him insane until he completely transformed into the Beast, stalking the bunker and killing his former comrades.

Henri is eventually able to recover the dynamite and detonator and blasts open the exit. However, instead of finally escaping, Henri accidentally falls deeper into the Roman ruins, where he has one final confrontation with the Beast, where he can either try to fight it (and send it plunging into an underground abyss) or flee.

Henri eventually manages to return to the surface. However, if he failed to kill the Beast, it escapes along with him before running off into No Man's Land. Regardless of the ending, Henri falls into a shell crater filled with the mangled corpses of French soldiers just as a German patrol approaches, leaving his fate uncertain.

== Development ==
Frictional Games described The Bunker as the franchise's "pivotal point", as it incorporates elements from sandbox games and focuses on emergent gameplay. According to game director Fredrik Olsson, the team focused on the game's replayability, and that each playthrough will lead to unique moments for players. With the game's procedural generation, the team wanted to avoid "linearity and predictability" and offer a challenging experience for players. He added that the team prioritized developing gameplay over crafting the game's narrative, though the game still features journal entries for players to further explore the game's world and its lore.

Weapons were added for a dual purpose, while the player can defend themselves with grenades and guns, they also can be used to break locks or set objects ablaze. The Bunker's revolver was designed to be "clunky" and take a long time to reload. “Loading that last bullet creates a strong sense of urgency, adding an extra layer of stress to already harrowing situations.”

Amnesia: The Bunker was announced in December 2022. Initially set to be released in March 2023, the team postponed the game's release to May 2023 as the team "had a tough winter with a slew of illnesses that has affected development". It was then further delayed by two weeks due to "unforeseen certification issues". The game was released for Windows PC, PlayStation 4, Xbox One, Xbox Series X and Series S on June 6, 2023.

In January 2025, publisher Abylight Studios announced a collaboration with developer Frictional Games to bring three of their most recent games (Soma, Amnesia: The Bunker, and Amnesia: Rebirth) to the Nintendo Switch.

== Reception ==
Reception

Aggregate score
Aggregator	Score
Metacritic	(PC) 77/100 (PS4) 73/100 (XSXS) 77/100

Review scores
Publication	Score
Eurogamer	4/5 stars
GameSpot	8/10
GamesRadar+	4/5 stars
IGN	8/10
PC Gamer (US)	93/100
Push Square	7/10 stars
Shacknews	6/10

Amnesia: The Bunker received "generally favorable" reviews from critics, except for PlayStation 4, which received "mixed or average" reviews, according to review aggregator website Metacritic.

While criticizing the monster AI as mediocre, IGN liked the pressure the game put on the player through the limited amount of generator fuel, "What this means is every trip out into the far corners of the bunker comes with a sense of urgency and purpose". GameSpot praised the tension present in the resource management mechanics of the game, writing, "All resources are finite, so using any of them must come with good reason or else you're damning yourself to failure". GamesRadar+ felt the story was weaker than previous entries, "The unfolding horror of Amnesia: The Bunker, told over old documents, is really enthralling, but it's not quite on the same level as Frictional's past works".

PC Gamer enjoyed the sound design of the title, "There's this ambient, cavernous hum to The Bunker, punctuated by the squeals of rats, occasional cries from the Beast, and the earthshaking thumps of German artillery". Eurogamer liked how the game encouraged experimentation, by utilizing the environment as a means to discover new things, "As terrifying as it is, it's such a thrill to find your brave explorations and inventiveness rewarded in such interesting ways".
