= Frictional Games =

Swedish video game developer

Frictional Games AB
- Type: Private
- Industry: Video games
- Founded: 1 January 2007; 19 years ago in Helsingborg, Sweden
- Founders: Thomas Grip; Jens Nilsson
- Headquarters: Malmö, Sweden
- Key people: Thomas Grip (creative director); Fredrik Olsson (creative lead)
- Products: Penumbra series; Amnesia series; Soma
- Number of employees: 35 (2025)
- Website: frictionalgames.com

Frictional Games AB is a Swedish independent video game developer based in Malmö, founded in January 2007 by Thomas Grip and Jens Nilsson. The company specialises in the development of survival horror games with very little or no combat gameplay mechanics. It is best known for its games Amnesia: The Dark Descent (2010) and Soma (2015).

== History ==
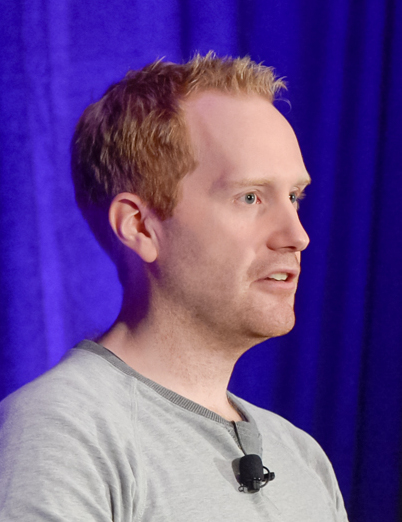
Thomas Grip, the co-founder of Frictional Games, at the 2016 Game Developers Conference

Frictional Games was founded by Thomas Grip and Jens Nilsson. Before founding the company, both had little professional experience in the video game industry, having only done some freelance jobs. The two began co-operating when Nilsson joined Grip on Unbirth, a hobby project that was later cancelled. They subsequently collaborated on other projects and formally established Frictional on 1 January 2007. The company was established in Helsingborg, Sweden, although most members worked remotely from other parts of Europe. Frictional's first game was Penumbra: Overture, based on a tech demo titled Penumbra and released in 2007. It was originally planned to be the first episode in a trilogy, however, due to problems with publisher Lexicon Entertainment, Frictional shifted to a partnership with Paradox Interactive. Under Paradox, the two remaining games in the trilogy were released as one game under the title Penumbra: Black Plague in 2008, followed by an additional expansion pack titled Penumbra: Requiem the same year.

Over an exactly three-year-long timespan, Frictional created and self-published Amnesia: The Dark Descent. The game was released on 8 September 2010 to generally favourable reviews; however, Frictional noted that it expected the game to struggle to become popular and profitable given its lack of a third-party publisher. Amnesia: The Dark Descent sold 36,000 copies within its first month of release, and a total of 1,360,000 copies within the first two years, earning the company a total revenue of about US$3.6 million in contrast to its US$360,000 development budget. According to Nilsson, the Frictional team did not know how to continue the Amnesia series and feared that a misguided attempt at an Amnesia game would "fail miserably". Instead, the team opted to draft The Chinese Room as a third-party developer to develop a second game, giving it advice on the horror aspects, while The Chinese Room was responsible for the plot and gameplay development. The game, Amnesia: A Machine for Pigs, was released by Frictional in 2013.

During the time of A Machine for Pigs' development, Frictional itself started working on a new game, which eventually became Soma, announced shortly after the release of Amnesia: A Machine for Pigs. Soma was self-released by Frictional on 22 September 2015 to generally favourable reviews and initial sales higher than those of Amnesia: The Dark Descent within the first days: Soma sold 92,000 units within ten days (in contrast to the 20,000 first-week sales of Amnesia: The Dark Descent), and 450,000 units in its first year (in contrast to the 390,000 first-year sales of Amnesia: The Dark Descent).

In 2016, Frictional Games announced that it began the production of two new, yet unannounced games, as a result of the high profitability of Soma. By 2019, it also planned to start pre-production on a third unannounced game. In August 2017, Frictional moved from Helsingborg to new offices on Stora Nygatan in Malmö. Around this time, the company had 16 employees. The Malmö offices housed half of its 25 staff members. Amnesia: Rebirth, a follow-up to The Dark Descent, was announced with a trailer in March 2020 and was released in October 2020.

Frictional Games released Amnesia: The Bunker on 6 June 2023 which marks the fourth installment of the Amnesia series.

As of October 2025, Frictional Games began releasing an ARG teaser for a joint project with Kepler Interactive. Content that was released as an update to SOMA led players to an interactive website for a fictional Hotel Samsara which encourages players to sign up for future updates on the project. Ontos, a spiritual successor to SOMA, was announced with a trailer at the 2025 Game Awards. The game will star Stellan Skarsgard and follow "a search for answers [which] quickly spirals into something far stranger."

== Technology ==
The HPL Engine is Frictional's in-house game engine. It is named after writer H. P. Lovecraft. The first iteration of the engine, HPL Engine 1, was used for the Penumbra series. This iteration was made open-source software on 12 May 2010, with most of the code licensed under GNU GPL-3.0-or-later. HPL Engine 2 was used for Amnesia: The Dark Descent and Amnesia: A Machine for Pigs, as well as prototype versions of Gone Home. It was also released under the GNU GPL-3.0-or-later licence, on 23 September 2020. HPL Engine 3 was used for Soma and later evolved into HPL Engine 3.5, which was used in Amnesia: Rebirth and Amnesia: The Bunker. A subsequent major version, HPL Engine 4, is planned for use in Ontos.

== Games ==
Year	Title	Platform(s)	Publisher(s)
2007	Penumbra: Overture	Linux, macOS, Windows	Paradox Interactive
2008	Penumbra: Black Plague	Linux, macOS, Windows	Paradox Interactive
2008	Penumbra: Requiem	Linux, macOS, Windows	Paradox Interactive
2010	Amnesia: The Dark Descent	Linux, macOS, Nintendo Switch, PlayStation 4, Windows, Xbox One	Frictional Games
2013	Amnesia: A Machine for Pigs (Note: Amnesia: A Machine for Pigs was developed by The Chinese Room.)	Linux, macOS, Nintendo Switch, PlayStation 4, Windows, Xbox One	Frictional Games
2015	Soma	Linux, macOS, Nintendo Switch, PlayStation 4, Windows, Xbox One	Frictional Games
2020	Amnesia: Rebirth	Amazon Luna, Linux, Nintendo Switch 2, PlayStation 4, Windows, Xbox One, Xbox Series X/S	Frictional Games
2023	Amnesia: The Bunker	PlayStation 4, Windows, Xbox One, Xbox Series X/S	Frictional Games
2027	Ontos	PlayStation 5, Windows, Xbox Series X/S	Kepler Interactive
