= Penumbra: Black Plague =

2008 video game

- Developer: Frictional Games
- Publisher: Paradox Interactive
- Designers: Jens Nilsson; Thomas Grip
- Programmer: Thomas Grip
- Artist: Anton Adamse
- Writer: Tom Jubert
- Composer: Mikko Tarmia
- Engine: HPL Engine 1
- Platforms: Windows, Mac OS X, Linux
- Release: Windows: NA: 12 February 2008; NA: 13 February 2008 (Retail); EU: 15 February 2008; OS X, Linux; 12 May 2008
- Genre: Survival horror
- Mode: Single-player

Penumbra: Black Plague is the second installment of the Penumbra series of episodic video games developed by Frictional Games. The story continues from the previous episode, Penumbra: Overture, showing the protagonist Philip moving away from the abandoned mine setting of the original to explore an underground research base. Black Plague was released in February 2008 to generally favourable reviews from critics. Although originally intended to conclude the series, a further expansion called Penumbra: Requiem was released later that year.

== Gameplay ==
Gameplay screenshot

Black Plague is an exploration-based survival horror game that takes place from a first-person perspective. The game's survival horror aspect mostly consists of avoiding various enemies which seek to injure or otherwise harm the protagonist. Compared to the previous game Overture, combat has been heavily de-emphasized, with the player no longer able to make weapons or create makeshift traps to fight enemies with. Instead, the emphasis is on the use of stealth tactics and fleeing to avoid attacks by enemy creatures. Gameplay features a mixture of exploration and solving physical puzzles.

Puzzles vary between traditional inventory puzzles often found in similar games of the survival horror genre and primarily physics based puzzles, such as grabbing and stacking boxes in order to build a rudimentary stairway in order to get past a laser tripwire, or placing boards in order to cross an environmental obstruction such as a pit. Unlike in the previous episode, the player must also frequently interact with the base's computer and security systems by acquiring passwords, retrieving biometric data or keycards, and repairing or overriding certain electronic or mechanical devices.

Information is scattered around the base in the form of written notes, recorded messages, saved documents, and various videos and emails that can be found on computers. The protagonist also comes into contact with several survivors which can provide more information and often direct the player to new missions or puzzles. A notebook kept by the protagonist helps keep this information in order and lists the player's current objectives. The protagonist must also overcome distortions to his vision and auditory systems due to his infection, which can cause him to hear or see things that are not there, have distorted sight, or lose some control over his own body. The player must try to overcome these challenges in order to progress through the game.

== Plot ==
The story of Black Plague begins as an email sent by Philip to a friend, explaining what has happened to him and begging him to finish the work he could not. The rest of the game then proceeds as a flashback narrated by Philip to his friend in the email, beginning from where the previous game left off.

The game begins with Philip waking up in a locked room, after being knocked out by an unseen being at the end of the first game. Philip manages to escape via a nearby air-vent, and finds himself still in Greenland, in the underground research facility of the Archaic Elevated Caste, a secret organization dedicated to discovering and researching ancient knowledge. The base is abandoned and in ruins, with all its personnel either dead or transformed into "the Infected", zombie-like creatures that attack Philip when they notice him. He soon discovers that he has also been infected; however, his reaction to the virus is extremely abnormal: instead of joining the infected hive-mind, he is taken over by the mind of one of the infected, the sarcastic and malevolent Clarence who constantly taunts Philip throughout the course of the game.

Via the base's computer network, Philip is contacted by Dr. Amabel Swanson, an Archaic research scientist who has managed to survive the outbreak by locking herself in her lab. Swanson promises to help cure Philip's infection, if he will make his way to her section of the facility and rescue her. Through dialogue with Swanson, and various scattered documents found throughout the base, Philip learns that the Archaic came to Greenland to look for the "Tuurngait", an ancient entity described in native Inuit mythology as primordial spirits native to the area. Penetrating deep underground, the Archaic found and released the Tuurngait, which was revealed to be a semi-parasitic virus, heavily implied to be from another world, that soon infected the base's personnel. Philip discovers his father Howard managed to communicate with the Tuurngait, but what he learned drove him to commit suicide after sending Philip a letter ordering him to destroy his research documents.

Philip eventually manages to make his way to Amabel's lab, but Clarence causes him to hallucinate and murder Amabel. Using Amabel's lab notes, Philip manages to rid himself of Clarence by extracting him using a lab machine. The machine transfers Clarence into a nearby corpse, which he reanimates and uses to attack Philip. He is saved by the Tuurngait itself, as several Infected arrive to destroy Clarence, for Clarence now possesses an individual body and mind rather than part of "the many" in Tuurngait. The Tuurngait communicates directly with Philip, sending him into his own mind and putting him through a series of spiritual tests designed to test his ability to cooperate, show mercy, and demonstrate self-sacrifice.

Once Philip passes the tests, the Tuurngait reveals all; it is an ancient entity that came to Earth millions of years ago. It once co-existed peacefully alongside the native Inuit, using "Infected" host bodies to pass its ancient knowledge to mankind. In time mankind began to grow and expand, and the Tuurngait burrowed underground to separate itself from the human world. When the Archaic came, they disturbed the Tuurngait's ancient slumber and attempted to exploit it, and it fought back against them in self-defense. The Tuurngait explains that mankind is intelligent and compassionate as individuals, but selfish, petty, and destructive as a whole, but it believes that Philip is different from most of mankind. The Tuurngait puts itself at Philip's mercy, asking him to send a message to someone above ground, for them to destroy all information regarding the Archaic's research facility so that the Tuurngait may rest in peace. This is the same request the Tuurngait made of Philip's father Howard, however Philip thwarted it by coming to investigate instead of following his father's instructions.

Philip seemingly agrees to the Tuurngait's request, and sends an email to a friend on the surface describing his adventure. However, stating that he has more in common with Clarence than with the Tuurngait, Philip gives his friend the coordinates of the mine and tells him to come and destroy the Tuurngait. His last words are: "Kill them. Kill them all".

== Development ==
First intended as a trilogy, the series was reduced to two episodes due to unidentified problems with the previous publisher, Lexicon Entertainment, with the announcement of Penumbra: Black Plague. This episode was published by Paradox Interactive. The developers were quite interested in fan feedback during the game's development, which became a driving factor in some of the changes done between Black Plague and Overture, such as the removal of dogs and other combat related enemies, as well as moving away somewhat from a reliance on written notes. Frictional Games later announced that Black Plague was to receive an expansion named Requiem, which was released in August 2008.

== Reception ==
Reception

Aggregate score
Aggregator	Score
Metacritic	78/100

Review scores
Publication	Score
1Up.com	A−
Adventure Gamers	4/5
Destructoid	(Burch) 8/10 (Bennett) 7.5/10
Edge	6/10
Eurogamer	7/10
GameSpot	8/10
GameSpy	3/5
GameZone	7.6/10
IGN	7.7/10
PC Gamer (US)	83%
The New York Times	(favourable)

Black Plague received "generally favourable reviews" according to the review aggregation website Metacritic. The removal of the combat system was met with a positive response, with IGN commenting that "without the awkward combat of Overture, Black Plague is a smoother experience where the clumsiness of the physics and control systems are exposed far less frequently." The game's use of physics based puzzles was also commented on positively, with PC Gamer UK deciding that the game's "big sell is the interface, offering the most visceral control over the game-world in any adventure. It's inspired, and when it works, it leaves you begging for other developers to steal it."

Some criticism was directed at the relative shortness of the game's campaign and rather abrupt concluding moments, with GameSpot stating that "such brevity and a dissatisfying conclusion might be more forgivable if a third Penumbra was on the way, but this sudden finale is a bit annoying given that this is the end of the line for the series." Adventure Gamers also commented on the game's length, commenting that many "will not relish how short it is", although going on to say that this "isn't necessarily a bad thing, as a certain momentum is maintained throughout, but may give those considering paying in full pause for thought."

Penumbra: Black Plague was nominated for a Writers' Guild of Great Britain Award in 2008 for Best Video Game Script.

In 2011, Adventure Gamers named Black Plague the 87th-best adventure game ever released.
