= Penumbra: Requiem =

- Developer: Frictional Games
- Publisher: Paradox Interactive
- Designers: Jens Nilsson; Thomas Grip
- Programmer: Thomas Grip
- Artist: Marc Nicander
- Writer: Tom Jubert
- Composer: Mikko Tarmia
- Engine: HPL Engine 1
- Platforms: Windows, Linux, Mac OS X
- Release: Windows; 27 August 2008; Linux, OS X 17 November 2008
- Genre: Survival horror
- Mode: Single-player

Penumbra: Requiem is an expansion pack to the game Penumbra: Black Plague developed by Frictional Games.

== Gameplay ==
Like the previous games, Requiem is an exploration-based adventure game that takes place from a first-person perspective. Unlike Black Plague and Overture however, the focus is almost exclusively on puzzle solving. No enemies are encountered, meaning that the player can only be injured by environmental hazards.

== Plot ==
Gameplay screenshot

The game begins as the last one ends, with Philip sending the 'kill them all' message. As soon as he finishes, one of the Infected barges in and hits Phillip on the head with something unseen. The player then controls a character in some kind of tomb. Items need to be collected in each chamber in order to move on to the next. In the journey, the player starts to see familiar places from other parts of the facility and begins to receive communications from persons who Philip had encountered previously, such as Dr. Richard Emminis who Philip encountered in the Computer Room of Black Plague, a member of the Archaic Elevated Caste called Eloff Carpenter, as well as a person who later identifies himself as Philip's former adviser, Red, from the first Penumbra game.

As time goes on, various strange happenings occur, such as the Computer referring to both Philip and the Player directly by name as well as more bizarre environments and puzzles. The game, and the entire series, has two possible endings. One concludes with Philip joining Red in the incinerator from Overture, deeming regular life not worth living. As the rest of Requiem seems to have been a figment of Philip's mind, this leaves him dead in the room where the game originally began and where Black Plague ended. Philip can also choose to leave Red to die on his own, and return to the fishing boat which was originally used to take him to the mine in the first place. This seems to be a fulfilling of Red's statement that it is "better to have a story and end it than never to realize it has begun".

== Development ==
With the announcement of Penumbra: Black Plague, the series (originally intended to be a trilogy) was reduced to two episodes due to unidentified problems with the previous publisher, Lexicon Entertainment. After the release of Black Plague, there continued to be no indication that the developers intended to expand the series other than an April Fools' Day posting about "Penumbra 3: Back With a Vengeance", a game which promised over-the-top violence and "an action-filled blood soaked ending!"

However, the developers did eventually decide that they would release a third installment in the form of an expansion pack in order to tie up loose ends and more fully utilize some of the series' characters, as well as to create a more puzzle-focused title in order to fully showcase the HPL Engine 1's advanced physics effects. Penumbra: Requiem was officially announced on 16 April 2008. During the expansion's development, work also began on what would become Amnesia: The Dark Descent.

== Reception ==
Reception

Aggregate score
Aggregator	Score
Metacritic	67/100

Review scores
Publication	Score
Adventure Gamers	3/5 stars
IGN	7.5/10
PC Gamer (UK)	60%

Penumbra: Requiem was less popular than the previous games in the series, receiving "average" reviews according to the review aggregation website Metacritic.
