= Serious Sam's Bogus Detour =

2017 video game

- Developer: Crackshell
- Publisher: Devolver Digital
- Designer: Jochum Skoglund
- Programmer: Niklas Myrberg
- Artists: Victor Ankarberg; Christian Nordgren
- Composer: Damjan Mravunac
- Series: Serious Sam
- Platforms: Linux, Windows
- Release: 20 June 2017
- Genre: Twin-stick shooter
- Modes: Single-player, multiplayer

Serious Sam's Bogus Detour is a 2017 twin-stick shooter game developed by Crackshell and published by Devolver Digital. One to four players traverse levels set in Egypt, Greece, and on the Moon, collecting weapons to be used against waves of enemies placed throughout the open areas. Character upgrades can be purchased using stars, which can be found within levels or obtained through experience points gained by killing enemies. Deathmatch and survival modes can be played with up to twelve players.

Revealed in December 2014, Bogus Detour was developed by Crackshell after designer Jochum Skoglund added an Easter egg of an enemy from Serious Sam to the studio's previous game, Hammerwatch. Through communication with Roman Ribarić of Serious Sam franchise owner Croteam, Crackshell was allowed the use of Serious Sam assets and later the rights to develop a full game in the Serious Sam series. Crackshell initially intended to self-publish Bogus Detour but later partnered with Devolver Digital. The game was formally announced in April 2017 and released in June for Linux and Windows.

Bogus Detour received positive reviews, with critics praising the translation of the Serious Sam series to the twin-stick shooter genre, the graphics, and the music. The progression system received mixed responses, while criticism was given to some minor design elements. The game sold poorly and failed to recoup its development costs by December 2017. Crackshell, in conjunction with the cracker Voksi, subsequently created a free version of the game in March 2018 to be pirated to entice players to purchase the original.

== Gameplay ==
Sam (centre) fighting off a wave of marines and Kleer skeletons

Serious Sam's Bogus Detour is a twin-stick shooter. The player controls Sam "Serious" Stone through ten open levels, distributed across three thematic locations: Egypt, Greece, and the Moon. Enemies of various types are placed around each level and mostly attack in waves, sometimes alongside bosses. The player character can use weapons, by default brandishing two pistols with unlimited ammunition. Further weapons and their required ammunition are scattered throughout each level. There are a total of eight weapon types, each with multiple variations, that can be selected from a weapon wheel.

The player can obtain stars by gathering experience points through killing enemies. These stars can be used to purchase character upgrades, such as improved movement speed or increased rate of fire. Stars are also hidden within levels, alongside other secrets. Some areas can only be accessed by obtaining keycards or breaking destructible walls. Enemies and hazards, such as toxic waste, inflict damage on the character. Depleting the character's health causes them to lose a life, of which they initially have three. After losing all lives, gameplay stops and the player's progress within the active level is reset.

Bogus Detour has multiple difficulty settings, as well as "switches" that allow alteration of specific gameplay elements, such as granting the character unlimited ammunition or disabling the heads-up display. The game can be played cooperatively with up to four players, either online or locally in split-screen. Up to twelve online players can compete in head-to-head deathmatch gameplay or a cooperative survival mode. Additional levels can be created using the built-in level editor and shared via the Steam Workshop.

== Development and release ==
Serious Sam's Bogus Detour was developed by Crackshell, a Swedish indie game studio founded by former Overkill Software developers. It was the studio's second game after Hammerwatch. Crackshell's designer, Jochum "Hipshot" Skoglund, enjoyed referencing old media he liked in his games. The team added the Beheaded Kamikaze, an enemy from the Serious Sam series, as an Easter egg to Temple of the Sun, a 2014 expansion for Hammerwatch. Considering turning the easter egg official, Skoglund got in contact with Roman Ribarić, the chief executive officer (CEO) of the Serious Sam franchise owner Croteam, through friends at the studios Skoglund had previously worked for. Ribarić had played and enjoyed Hammerwatch and gave Crackshell free rein to use Serious Sam multimedia assets for their endeavour. He was also fond of the resulting crossover, and while talking about it, Skoglund asked whether he could pitch a game idea to Croteam. Subsequently, he and an artist at Crackshell created a tech demo titled "2D, Seriously?", featuring Sam seen from a top-down view with rough environment details. Other working titles included "Serious Top-Down" and "Serious Sam 2D". Skoglund sent a screenshot of the in-development demo to Ribarić, who was fond of it and provided Crackshell with a contract to develop a full game based on it.

Crackshell's Niklas "Myran" Myrberg created a proprietary game engine (later named A000FF) and level editor using C++ and AngelScript, improving on issues the team had faced with the C#-based engine he had developed for Hammerwatch. They collaborated with artists Victor Ankarberg and Christian Nordgren. Nordgren created rotating weapon sprites with 3D models made in Autodesk Maya that were rendered in 2D at sixteen angles. Skoglund devised the plot after reading through the synopses of previous Serious Sam games, settling on a diversion during the story of Serious Sam: The First Encounter. He chose to also include characters from other Serious Sam games, such as the alien marines featured in Serious Sam II. He noted that the Serious Sam series had many dedicated fans, especially "older gamers" in Eastern Europe, which made it appealing to fill Bogus Detour with references to previous games. Skoglund thought it was fun to work on a third-party intellectual property (IP) and to have access to all Serious Sam and The Talos Principle assets, including audio, visuals and the Serious Engine. He liked how material and ideas from The Talos Principle, which originated as an experiment during the development of Serious Sam 4, could be used in a Serious Sam project. Skoglund wanted to show Croteam that Crackshell had taken the project seriously and sought to deliver a substantial interpretation of the series. He hoped to be able to use the game to get work on other IPs he had been a fan of, such as Syndicate.

Skoglund revealed Bogus Detour through TIGSource's forums in December 2014, saying that the studio intended to self-publish the game in 2016. The Crackshell team, which spanned five members in May 2016, shared development updates on TIGSource and later through Twitter and YouTube. In April 2017, Devolver Digital, which had since become the game's publisher, released a first trailer for the game. Bogus Detour was exhibited at the E3 game conference in early June 2017. It was released on 20 June 2017 for Linux and Windows, delivered via the Steam and GOG.com storefronts. The game is considered part of the Serious Sam Indie Series, which also included Serious Sam Double D and Serious Sam: The Random Encounter. Multiple patches released until August 2017 fixed bugs and added features like split-screen functionality. The game's soundtrack, composed by Damjan Mravunac, was released to YouTube in July 2017.

== Reception ==
Reception

Aggregate score
Aggregator	Score
Metacritic	76/100

Review scores
Publication	Score
Hardcore Gamer	4/5
Jeuxvideo.com	16/20
IGN España	7/10
Vandal	7/10

Serious Sam's Bogus Detour received "generally favorable reviews", according to the review aggregator website Metacritic, which calculated a weighted average rating of 76/100 based on twelve critic reviews. James Cunningham of Hardcore Gamer opined that the game was a "perfect" translation of the Serious Sam franchise to the twin-stick shooter genre. Clotaire Jacquier of Jeuxvideo.com felt that the top-down view complemented core series elements and that the game was a "successful mix" between the series and the genre. This was echoed by Enrique Garcia of Vandal, who stated that, although Bogus Detour was neither perfect nor innovative within its genre and mechanics, the game respected all common elements of a Serious Sam game. In a 2020 retrospective on the Serious Sam series, Jonathan Kaharl of Hardcore Gaming 101 said that Bogus Detour was "easily the best of the Serious Sam spin-offs".

Cunningham lauded the game's "gorgeous" pixel art as "well detailed and animated". Similarly, Jose A. Rodríguez, writing for IGN's Spanish outlet, called it a "work of art" and cited satisfaction in gradually distributing enemy remains across levels. Garcia also liked the "retro-style" visuals, while Jacquier labelled the graphical and musical presentation as solid. According to Rodríguez, the music and sound underlined the gameplay well. Also noted positively were the difficulty, exploration rewards, and multiplayer, although Jacquier was disappointed by the scarcity of online players at the time of his review. Rodríguez considered the progression system the best part of the game, while Jacquier criticised it as unclear and laborious.

Jacquier experienced some irritation when traversing long distances across empty areas, especially due to Sam's initially slow pace. Rodríguez found that the small size of the player character could cause disorientation with numerous elements on-screen, which was amplified when there were multiple players.

=== Sales ===
Serious Sam's Bogus Detour sold poorly and had not recouped its development costs by December 2017. The Bulgarian cracker Voksi, who was friendly with Crackshell and had tested the beta version of the game, approached the studio in March 2018 with the idea of creating a sanctioned build that could be pirated. This version was distributed through Voksi's forum, Revolt, and prepared with a note asking players to buy the game to support the developers, while otherwise not obstructing gameplay.
