= Serious Sam: The Second Encounter =

2002 video game

- Developer: Croteam (Note: The Seriously Warped Deathmatch component was developed by A Few Screws Loose.)
- Publisher: Gathering of Developers (Note: The game was published for the Xbox by Gotham Games. Devolver Digital published the HD and VR versions, co-publishing the Xbox 360 HD release with Majesco.)
- Designers: Davor Hunski; Davor Tomičić
- Programmers: Alen Ladavac; Davor Hunski; Dean Sekulić; Nikola Mosettig; Darko Martinović
- Artists: Admir Elezović; Tomislav Pongrac; Dinko Pavičić
- Composer: Damjan Mravunac
- Series: Serious Sam
- Engine: Serious Engine
- Platforms: Windows; Xbox; HD; Windows; Xbox 360; Stadia; Nintendo Switch; PlayStation 4; Xbox One; VR; Linux; Windows
- Release: 5 February 2002: Windows; 5 February 2002; Xbox; 12 November 2002; Windows (HD); 28 April 2010; Xbox 360 (HD); 22 September 2010; Linux, Windows (VR); 4 April 2017; Stadia (HD); 3 March 2020; Switch, PS4, XONE (HD); 17 November 2020
- Genre: First-person shooter
- Modes: Single-player, multiplayer

Serious Sam: The Second Encounter is a 2002 first-person shooter game developed by Croteam and published by Gathering of Developers. It is the successor to Serious Sam: The First Encounter and the second game in the Serious Sam series. Taking place immediately after The First Encounter, it follows the soldier Sam "Serious" Stone, whose spaceship crashes back to Earth on his way from ancient Egypt to Sirius, requiring him to seek the Holy Grail to continue his journey. As Sam, the player traverses linear levels, either enclosed or set on open plains, and battles increasingly large waves of enemies with an expanding arsenal. The gameplay builds on that of The First Encounter while adding additional weapons, more enemy types, and platforming elements, and additionally contains the Seriously Warped Deathmatch mod by A Few Screws Loose.

The development began immediately after Croteam had completed the first game. Working in an improved version of Serious Engine with an expanded team, the studio set out to move away from the ancient Egyptian setting and incorporated larger levels and additional weapons. Initially intended as a mission pack, The Second Encounter was turned into a standalone product for its February 2002 release. The game received positive reviews, with praise for its improvements over The First Encounter but criticism for its lack of innovation. The level variety and presentation were well received, as were the music and inclusion of power-ups. The bosses raised mixed opinions. Like its predecessor, the game was highlighted for its price–performance ratio. It was GameSpot's "Game of the Month" for February 2002 and "Best Budget Game on PC" of the year.

The Second Encounter and its predecessor have been combined into one in several packages, including an Xbox port released by Gotham Games in November 2002. Instead of a third episode, The Second Encounter was followed up by a sequel, Serious Sam II, in October 2005. With the publisher Devolver Digital, Croteam developed a remake, Serious Sam HD: The Second Encounter, that was first released in April 2010 and later brought to Xbox 360, Stadia, Nintendo Switch, PlayStation 4, and Xbox One. A virtual reality version of that remake, Serious Sam VR: The Second Encounter, was released in April 2017. Serious Sam: The Third Encounter was announced in October 2026.

== Gameplay ==
Sam fighting Zorg Mercenaries using a flamethrower

Serious Sam: The Second Encounter is a first-person shooter that expands upon the gameplay of its predecessor, Serious Sam: The First Encounter. As Sam "Serious" Stone, the player traverses twelve mostly linear levels across three thematic settings. In each level, the player faces large waves of enemies. Some spaces are arenas that need to be cleared of enemies before the player can proceed. The Second Encounter adds seven enemy variants to the cast of the original game, which similarly exhibit the behaviour of approaching or shooting at the player directly. Unlike The First Encounter, the game features several stages with dynamic environments, such as rooms with multi-directional gravity, multiple arena floors, or slippery ice sections. The Second Encounter also introduces platforming elements, and makes traps appear more frequently. The end of each thematic setting features a boss battle.

The Second Encounter expands Sam's arsenal from The First Encounter to include a chainsaw, a flamethrower, and a sniper rifle with a scope. The scarcely available Serious Bomb kills all enemies within the blast range. The game further adds four power-ups with temporary effects: Serious Speed (which increases the player's movement speed), Serious Damage (which strengthens Sam's weapons), Invulnerability, and Invisibility. In multiplayer, The Second Encounter supports cooperative play on all single-player maps for up to sixteen players. For the deathmatch modes, the game increased the number of levels to eight. The game includes the Seriously Warped Deathmatch mod, which comprises twenty deathmatch levels, additional weapons, and modes like capture the flag.

== Plot ==
Serious Sam: The Second Encounter begins with recounting the events of The First Encounter: In the 22nd century, forces commanded by the alien overlord Mental were attacking humanity, whose leaders sent the soldier Sam "Serious" Stone (voiced by John Dick) back in time to ancient Egypt using an artefact called the Time-Lock. Sam's mission was to uncover information about the builders of the Time-Lock, the ancient alien civilisation of the Sirians. He fought his way through Egypt and discovered a Sirian spaceship, the SSS Centerprice. At the Great Pyramid, he defeated Ugh-Zan III, entered the spaceship, and took off towards Sirius.

Following the first game's events, a group of onlookers attempts to catch up to the Centerprice and inadvertently collides with it, causing the ship to fall back to Earth and crash into the Sierra Madre de Chiapas, near the Maya city of Palenque. Using information obtained from the Centerprice, Sam's Neurotronically Implanted Combat Situation Analyzer (NETRICSA) informs him that the Sirians had prepared a backup vehicle in case the spaceship was destroyed. Sam must therefore find the Holy Grail, which is located 400 years away. As the Sirians had built a Time-Lock for each ancient civilisation, NETRICSA guides him to that of the Mayans in Teotihuacan. After passing through the legendary Xibalba underneath the city, he arrives at the Pyramid of the Sun and defeats the wind god Kukulkan, who was guarding the Time-Lock.

This transports Sam to a ziggurat in Babylonia. He heads into Persepolis to find the temple of Gilgamesh, the palace of King Tilmun, and ultimately the Tower of Babel. Collecting the three Tablets of Wisdom in the surrounding gardens grants him entry to the tower, where he kills the Exotech Larva, Mental's purpose-designed guard for the Babylonian Time-Lock.

Sam arrives in the medieval Polish town of Krwawitze in 1138. NETRICSA informs him of the powerful Arc-Al-Magi guild of wizards and guides him to their Book of Wisdom, which reveals the location of the Holy Grail. The book leads Sam to the former Arc-Al-Magi hideout, where a magic portal in the fabled Lava Caves takes him to the Ice Castle with the Holy Grail. Inside, however, he finds the grail to have been removed. NETRICSA believes the Arc-Al-Magi were attacked by Mental's forces and hid the Holy Grail at their Church of Sacred Blood. Sam passes through the Corridor of Death to reach the cathedral, where he overcomes Mordekai the Summoner, one of Mental's longest servants, to obtain the Holy Grail. Finally, he uses the backup rocket ship to continue his journey to Sirius.

== Development and release ==
The Croatian studio Croteam began working on Serious Sam: The Second Encounter immediately after completing The First Encounter. The original game was successful enough for the company to purchase new computer hardware to use for further development. Early on, Croteam hired the level designer Ivan Mika and the programmer Nikola Mosettig, bringing its headcount to twelve. Later recruitments included the programmer Darko Martinović and the business assistant Helena Hunski, and more were brought in as Croteam moved into larger offices during development. The Second Encounter was initially handled as a mission pack until Croteam's chief executive officer, Roman Ribarić, and Gathering of Developers (the Take-Two Interactive subsidiary that had published The First Encounter) agreed to make it a standalone product. Although marketed as a sequel, Ribarić stated The Second Encounter was "neither a mission pack nor a sequel; it is simply the next episode".

The team built the game on an upgraded version of Serious Engine, which it had developed for The First Encounter. Improvements to the engine's tools were developed with suggestions from their fan community, which provided daily feedback through emails and forums. New features included skeletal animation, Ogg Vorbis audio compression, enhanced destruction effects, a procedural particle system, and support for DirectX. While Mosettig was working on the particle system, he accidentally duplicated one line of code that caused everything to be rendered twice. When he noticed this and removed the line, the game's performance improved significantly and the frame rate doubled.

The Second Encounter moved away from the ancient Egyptian setting of The First Encounter. Ribarić believed creating three new environments would help maintain the interest of those who played the first game. Within the new settings, Mika designed his first level around Teotihuacan. The resulting level had to be split into three, accounting for a quarter of the entire game. Although the game has fewer levels than The First Encounter, Croteam aimed to make individual levels larger and added more interactive elements to add variety to the gameplay. As the original arsenal "had enough weapons", the few new ones were added solely for their profound impact on the gameplay. Some planned weapons, including a mortar strapped to Sam's back, were scrapped. By mid-September 2001, the game was "almost complete" in an alpha state, with Croteam targeting a release in December 2001. At Ribarić's request, the four-person mod team A Few Screws Loose (composed of Nick "Xavier" Macron, Chris "LanThief" Kreager, Ben "Vinz" Frech, and Sean "mwadaibe" Center) worked with Croteam to produce an updated version of their Seriously Warped Deathmatch mod to be packaged with the game.

Gathering of Developers formally announced The Second Encounter in September 2001 and scheduled it for release in November. The game entered alpha testing in early October and was content-complete in beta three weeks later. While a second stage of beta testing took place at TalonSoft at the end of the month, Croteam had begun working on the game's voice acting and manual. In early November, The Second Encounter was delayed to early 2002 while Croteam sought to resolve bugs. By 10 December, it was a "gold candidate" awaiting approval for release from Take-Two. Croteam had completed a demo for the game by this time, releasing it the following day. It was also hosted on several mirror sites. When reviewing the tentative box art from Gathering of Developers, Croteam requested several changes, most of which were not implemented due to time constraints. Take-Two announced that The Second Encounter had gone gold on 4 January 2002. Gathering of Developers released it on 5 February 2002. Some retailers in the United Kingdom had broken the street date two weeks early. To promote the game, it was exhibited at thirty iGaming LAN gaming centres during the week after the release, with some of them providing a preview on 3 February. The publisher also launched the "Disco Inferno" contest that gave away a GeForce 4 Ti 4600 graphics card to the designer of the best "disco cathedral" deathmatch map.

== Reception ==
Reception

Aggregate score
Aggregator	Score
Metacritic	85/100

Review scores
Publication	Score
AllGame	4/5
Computer Games Magazine	4/5
Computer Gaming World	4/5
Eurogamer	9/10
GameSpot	9.1/10
GameSpy	82/100
GameZone	9/10
IGN	9.2/10
PC Gamer (US)	82%
X-Play	2/5
Games Domain	4/5
Voodoo Extreme	85%

Serious Sam: The Second Encounter received "generally favorable reviews", according to the review aggregator website Metacritic, which calculated a weighted average rating of 85/100 based on twenty-two critic reviews. Several outlets directly compared the game to The First Encounter. IGN's Ivan Sulic said the predecessor had been expanded upon "in all the right ways" when regarded as an expansion rather than a sequel. Brett Todd of Computer Games Magazine likened it to how The Godfather Part II improved upon The Godfather, while Elliott Chin of Computer Gaming World considered it to be to The First Encounter what Doom II was to Doom. Jeremy Williams of PC Gamer opined that The Second Encounter was "better than the original in almost every respect".

However, Chin believed the sparse addition of weapons and enemies caused the game to feel tedious after some time. Sal Accardo of GameSpy considered the game's lengthy arena sections to be particularly tiresome. On Extended Play, Adam Sessler weighed this as the game's biggest shortcoming and felt that it, combined with "uninteresting" platforming, made the game less enjoyable than The First Encounter. Mike Anderiesz wrote for The Guardian that the game's structure had become predictable since The First Encounter, akin to a "one-trick pony".

In contrast, Greg Kasavin argued the action gameplay "is some of the best you'll find in any shooter to date", with level designs and production values excelling those of The First Encounter. GameZone's Chuck "Ovaldog" said the new weapons, enemies, and power-ups had the game "come to life". Todd observed that enemy waves had become more varied, while the added traps interactive environment segments broke the monotony. Gary Downs from Games Domain felt the new weapons corrected a gameplay imbalance he had observed in The First Encounter. While Accardo considered the game's bosses less impressive than that of The First Encounter, Williams said he found them entertaining. Uros Jojic of Voodoo Extreme noted an increased difficulty.

Downs and Sulic lauded the game's foliage, texture detail, lighting, and environments. This was echoed by Mark Hoogland of AllGame, who praised the level designs for their variety and presentation, as well as the strategy one had to master to beat each enemy wave. Todd similarly commended the setting variations, as well as their aptly designed environments and soundtrack. Kasavin also expressed that the "excellent, effective score" ideally fits the theme and pacing. While he bemoaned the game's bad puns, Eurogamer's John Bye enjoyed the self-deprecating humour. In a 2016 report, the Ministry of Youth and Sports of Turkey accused the game of Islamophobia for depicting fights near scenery resembling the tomb of Ali.

Unlike its predecessor, The Second Encounter was priced at £20 in the United Kingdom and did not face an increased list price after reviewers had recommended it for its price–performance ratio. Consequently, the game was recommended for its budget price. According to NPD Techworld, the game was the eighth-best-selling game of its week of release and in third place the following week.

=== Accolades ===
GameSpot named The Second Encounter its "Game of the Month" for February 2002 and the year's "Best Budget Game on PC". The game was used for benchmarks of graphics cards.

== Legacy ==
=== Port and sequel ===
An Xbox compilation that bundles The First Encounter and The Second Encounter was in development by January 2002, with Serious Engine already adapted for the platform. At the time, Croteam was negotiating with Take-Two to have the compilation released by the end of the year. In July 2002, Take-Two established the label Gotham Games, with Serious Sam for the Xbox to be among its first products. The compilation features thirty-five levels and improved graphical elements like reworked weapon models. Additionally, it amends the points system to have the player earn lives as well as higher scores through combos. It was released on 12 November 2002. On Windows, the compilation was released as Serious Sam: Gold Edition in 2003 with an additional episode made by the modder Trisk.

Beyond The Second Encounter, Croteam had planned to release a third episode alongside a movie, with its script waiting for approval by October 2001. Instead, Serious Sam II, described as a "true sequel" to The First Encounter and The Second Encounter, was announced in September 2002 and released in October 2005. Serious Sam: The Third Encounter, which immediately follows The Second Encounter's events, was announced in October 2026 and is in early development.

=== Remake ===
In June 2009, the publisher Majesco announced a high-definition remake of The First Encounter, Serious Sam HD: The First Encounter, for Windows and the Xbox 360. For this remake, Croteam worked with the nascent publisher Devolver Digital, founded by the Gathering of Developers co-founders Mike Wilson and Harry Miller. As Devolver Digital had not been licensed as a publisher for the Xbox 360 yet, it published the Windows version and worked with Majesco on the Xbox 360 release. Days after the remake was released for Windows on 24 November 2009, Devolver Digital announced Serious Sam HD: The Second Encounter. It was released for Windows on 28 April 2010, followed by the Xbox 360 version, released by Majesco, on 22 September. In May 2012, Devolver Digital announced and released the Legend of the Beast downloadable content for the remake, containing three maps each for the campaign, survival mode, and deathmatch mode. Alongside its release, Devolver Digital began offering the game's multiplayer modes for free.

The First Encounter, The Second Encounter, and their remakes were bundled on Steam as Serious Sam HD: Gold Edition from September 2010. They were distributed physically for the Xbox 360 with The Serious Sam Collection, released by Mastertronic Group in July 2013. Serious Sam HD: The First Encounter, Serious Sam HD: The Second Encounter (including Legend of the Beast), and Serious Sam 3: BFE became part of Serious Sam Collection, which was released for the Stadia streaming service on 3 March 2020. Serious Sam Collection was brought to the Nintendo Switch, PlayStation 4, and Xbox One on 17 November 2020.

Around 2016, a small team within Croteam began developing a virtual reality version of the first game's remake, Serious Sam VR: The First Encounter, based on its prior work on Serious Sam VR: The Last Hope. On 4 April 2017, a few days after that version's launch, Croteam also released Serious Sam VR: The Second Encounter. Both versions of the remake are part of the Serious Sam Fusion 2017 game hub.

=== Fan project ===
The fan collective Alligator Pit developed Serious Sam Classics: Revolution, an updated compilation of The First Encounter and The Second Encounter with additional content, under the oversight of Croteam. It was expected to be released between the PlayStation 3 version of Serious Sam 3: BFE in 2014 and Serious Sam 4. Devolver Digital released Serious Sam Classics: Revolution into Steam Early Access in April 2014 but its development halted after late 2016 when the members of Alligator Pit became preoccupied with other matters. Croteam eventually took over the development and released the game in August 2019, giving it for free to existing owners of the original games on Steam.
