= Serious Sam Double D =

2011 video game

- Developer: Mommy's Best Games
- Publisher: Devolver Digital (Note: Devolver Digital co-published the Xbox 360 version with Mastertronic.)
- Designer: Nathan Fouts
- Programmers: Nathan Fouts; Richard Rosenthal
- Artist: Nathan Fouts
- Writer: AJ Johnson
- Composer: Hamdija Ajanovic
- Series: Serious Sam
- Engine: XNA
- Platforms: Windows, Xbox 360
- Release: Windows; August 30, 2011; October 21, 2013 (XXL); Xbox 360; February 20, 2013 (XXL)
- Genre: Side-scrolling shooter
- Modes: Single-player, multiplayer (XXL)

Serious Sam Double D is a 2011 side-scrolling shooter game developed by Mommy's Best Games and published by Devolver Digital. The game follows Sam "Serious" Stone traveling through various historical settings to destroy the hordes of his nemesis, Mental, and its teleportation beacons. As Sam, the player navigates 2D levels and can use the "gun stacker" to create vertical stacks of up to six weapons that are fired simultaneously. Enemies appear from all sides, and their corpses can be used as platforms.

Announced in March 2011, Double D was created as part of the Serious Sam Indie Series to promote the release of Serious Sam 3: BFE. Devolver Digital requested a "Contra on acid", and the designer Nathan Fouts modeled the game after Mommy's Best Games's first release, Weapon of Choice. Double D debuted for Windows in August 2011. Serious Sam Double D XXL, an expanded version, was co-released by Mastertronic for the Xbox 360 via Xbox Live Arcade in February 2013, introducing more content and a local cooperative multiplayer mode. This version was ported back to Windows and released in October 2013 as a free update for the original game.

Both versions of Double D received mixed reviews. The gun stacker was well received, although a lack of depth was noted. The sound design was praised. Conflicting opinions were raised regarding the game's writing, level design, music, and visual style. Its repetitiveness and technical issues were criticized.

== Gameplay ==
Sam (left) clashing with a Caterfighter using a six-weapon stack

Serious Sam Double D is a 2D side-scrolling shooter with run and gun, platform, and exploration elements. It is played as a twin-stick shooter with a gamepad or with a keyboard–mouse control combination. The primary objective is to lead Sam "Serious" Stone through various historical settings, fight enemies from the horde of his nemesis, Mental, and destroy the teleportation beacons it has placed. The antagonist is General Maxilla, who is leading the horde on Mental's behalf. Sam, as the player character, traverses confined levels, most of which have a primary route leading to the right, while others have branching paths, and some include puzzles. Enemies approach from multiple directions and attack using varying behaviors: some engage in melee combat, others bear ranged weapons, and some act as suicide bombers.

Sam can use up to four weapons of each of eight types, which can be collected throughout levels. By default, he brandishes one machine pistol. As part of the "gun stacker", using collectible connectors, the player can stack up to six weapons vertically and fire them simultaneously. Eight stacks can be configured and, at any time, altered and swapped between. Each gun has a separate type of ammunition, of which explosive projectiles may inflict self-harm on the character. Once acquired, a portable jump pad can be thrown repeatedly. It remains where it lands, including on walls, and Sam and enemies bounce off it. Among other techniques, wall jumps can be performed using it. Sam's movement direction can be adjusted mid-air.

Upon death, enemy corpses persist in place and become navigable platforms. Some level sections continuously spawn enemies until enough corpses pave the way, either vertically or horizontally, for Sam to proceed. Some collectibles are hidden, among them unlockable challenges that pit the player against a certain number of enemies with a predetermined arsenal. The game automatically saves progress at checkpoints, while quicksaves can be performed manually.

In Serious Sam Double D XXL, each type of weapon has four distinct upgrades. These, as well as ammunition, can be purchased from shops using currency dropped by enemies killed by the player characters. For the local multiplayer mode, a second player, assuming the role of Dan "Huff" Huffington, can join at any time and engage in cooperative gameplay. If either player character goes off-screen, he is automatically transported back to the other. If one of them dies, the other can resurrect him by collecting crosses the corpse emits. Two players can also engage in head-to-head combat in a separate mode. Of the twenty-one levels in XXL, three employ auto-running gameplay using vehicles.

== Development and release ==
=== Serious Sam Double D ===
Serious Sam Double D was developed by Mommy's Best Games, an indie game studio founded in 2007 by Nathan Fouts. The studio had previously created Weapon of Choice (its first), Shoot 1Up, and Explosionade. After coming across Weapon of Choice, Devolver Digital, the publisher of the Serious Sam series, contacted Fouts, asking him to create a game as part of the Serious Sam Indie Series, a triplet of spin-offs to be created by small studios to promote the impending launch of Serious Sam 3: BFE. The Indie Series also encompasses Serious Sam: Kamikaze Attack! and Serious Sam: The Random Encounter. Fouts had been a fan of the series, wherefore he accepted the request. The publisher sought a "Contra on acid", while Fouts ruled out simply creating a 2D conversion of a previous Serious Sam game. Fouts modeled Double D after Weapon of Choice, reusing and improving on its development tools and XNA-based game engine. Using a prototype image and specifications for the "gun stacker" mechanic, he pitched the idea to Devolver Digital, which quickly greenlit it. The subtitle "Double D" characterizes that the game is in 2D, as opposed to previous entries in the series.

Fouts was responsible for the design, hand-drawn art, animations, programming, and sound effects. He was joined by three collaborators: Arizona-based Hamdija Ajanovic composed original music, Florida-based AJ Johnson wrote the story and dialog, and Richard Rosenthal provided further programming. Croteam, the main developer of the Serious Sam series, was hands-off in the development. Devolver Digital rarely interfered with Fouts's creative direction but provided funding and marketing. The gun stacker was conceived because Fouts wanted to include irregular guns (as he had in his previous games) but constrained himself to those from previous Serious Sam games. At one point, up to twelve guns could be stacked, but Fouts considered this chaotic and reduced the number to six. The ability to stack chainsaws was added in response to a comment by user greyson97 on a Joystiq article about the game. The jump pad was added to adapt the circle strafing technique often used in 3D Serious Sam games. For levels that require the player to pile enemy corpses, Fouts was inspired by game covers that depicted the protagonist standing on such a pile, although the games themselves had no such element. He picked ancient Egypt as the first setting, as fans of the series were already accustomed to it, and settled on original locations for later parts. The game incorporates several enemies previously seen in other Serious Sam games, as well as original designs.

The Serious Sam Indie Series was announced by Devolver Digital in March 2011. An early version of Double D was playable at the PAX East trade show later that month, and at E3 2011 in June. During development, Fouts was under pressure to finish his game before Serious Sam 3: BFE was released. Three trailers were published, one in July and two in August. The first two showcased parts of the gameplay, while the third coincided with the launch. Fouts was not significantly involved in their creation but liked them nonetheless. Double D was released for Windows on August 30, 2011, as the first entry in the Serious Sam Indie Series. The game was cracked by the Theta group within five hours of release, which Fouts described as "flattering" as it would have required high interest. A free demo was made available in October. Fouts held a postmortem at the March 2012 Game Developers Conference.

=== Serious Sam Double D XXL ===
Following the release, Fouts took a break before commencing work on an Xbox 360 port in December 2011. Mommy's Best Games and Devolver Digital agreed on features that would make such a port worth releasing, which Fouts subsequently developed, following the content specifications for the platform. By March 2012, Fouts was deeply engaged in creating new game art for a "(sorta) secret project" relating to Double D. Voice-over was added for all characters, with John Dick reprising his role as Sam. For the cooperative multiplayer mode, Fouts initially considered adding a "Hologram Sam", based on one of the characters from the multiplayer modes of other Serious Sam games, as the second player character. He eventually agreed with Michael Dalmon, the actor from the trailers, to use his voice and likeness, adding his character to the game as Dan "Huff" Huffington, along with additional dialog between him and Sam. To combat repetitiveness and adjust the game's pacing, Fouts created more levels that required less shooting, some of which used vehicles and others necessitated strategizing. Some existing levels were slightly adjusted to suit the changes made to guns and ammunition. He stated that many of the elements added were previously not included in the original game due to time constraints. The expanded release was announced in May 2012 as Serious Sam Double D XXL, with a projected release later that year. The certification process for Xbox Live Arcade was completed in December 2012.

In a two-part "Gun Diary" series of videos publicized between January and February 2013, Fouts explained the additions made to XXL. By February, he devoted most of his work time to marketing efforts for the game. Ajanovic, Johnson, and Rosenthal also worked on this version in their respective capacities. A launch trailer was released alongside XXL. Devolver Digital released the game through Xbox Live Arcade on February 20, 2013, co-publishing it with Mastertronic. Mommy's Best Games held a launch event titled "Shave and a Haircut 8-Bit" in March in Louisville, Kentucky, and invited local game developers to showcase their work. At the time, Fouts stated that XXL was likely to arrive on personal computers at some point. In June 2013, he started porting the game to the platform, cleaning up hard-coded elements, and after a break continued development in September. XXL was released on Steam on October 21, 2013, as a free update for existing owners of Double D, which remained playable separately. The Serious Sam Collection, a physical compilation of Serious Sam games including XXL for Xbox 360, was released by Mastertronic and Maximum Games in July 2013. The game was altered to run directly off the disc and without requiring a connection to the Xbox Live services, which was otherwise a requirement of XNA-based games. Fouts believed that this was the first time an XNA game had been distributed physically. XXL continued to "sell well" through 2015, although sales had been declining. The Xbox 360 version was delisted from Xbox Live Arcade shortly after Mastertronic filed for administration in November 2015.

== Reception ==
Reception

Aggregate score
Aggregator	Score
Metacritic	PC: 66/100; X360: 68/100

Review scores
Publication	Score
Destructoid	PC: 7/10; X360: 6.5/10
Eurogamer	PC: 6/10; X360: 7/10
IGN	PC: 7/10
VentureBeat	X360: 82/100

Serious Sam Double D received "mixed or average reviews", according to the review aggregator website Metacritic, which calculated a weighted average rating of 66/100 for the original version and 68/100 for XXL. Jacob Siegal (VentureBeat) ranked it as the fourth-best indie game of 2011. Several critics responded to using the gun stacker with joy, satisfaction, or a sense of empowerment. James Stephanie Sterling (Destructoid) called it "clever", saying that it added a "perfect level of freshness" to the Serious Sam formula, which Iain Farquhar (Bit-Tech) opined had been adapted faithfully. However, Sterling and Farquhar each cited a lack of depth in the mechanic, finding themselves using the same weapon combinations for most of the game. Simon Parkin and Patrick Hancock, reviewing XXL for Eurogamer and Destructoid, respectively, considered Double D a good fit for the Serious Sam series, although Sterling believed that it would have limited appeal to players with no background knowledge of the series.

Some reviewers criticized the game's repetitiveness, while Ozzie Mejia (Shacknews) specifically pointed out the similarity between bosses. According to Rich Stanton (Eurogamer), the shooting in the game was "quantity over quality" and did not feel good enough to make up for its extensive use. Speaking of the upgrades introduced in XXL, Parkin said that they critically changed the game and its feel. Stanton further disliked that explosions inflict self-harm and found little replay value. Hancock noted a lack of a "meaningful" learning curve. David Sanchez (GameZone) opined that the level design was "nicely varied", although Parkin called it "scattershot and somewhat amateurish". Charles Onyett (IGN) was entertained by the difficulty progression. The change of pace posed by the puzzle sections was welcomed by Stanton and Adam Smith (Rock Paper Shotgun), of whom Stanton wished there were more. Hancock labeled the unlockable challenges as "interesting" due to their limited arsenal, while Farquhar opined that they added little content beyond the campaign. Furthermore, Hancock considered the head-to-head mode in XXL a "throwaway distraction".

The writing received conflicting responses: Sterling called the humor "genuinely amusing", Onyett characterized it as "childish" but found it fitting for the game's tone, Sanchez described the writing as "pretty sharp and filled with genuine laugh-out-loud moments", and Mejia expressed general enjoyment. Conversely, Smith stated that the writing was bland and the dialog unnecessary and "not amusing", Killham felt that its jokes "generally fall flat", and Hancock said that the humor was "very hit or miss, though it misses way more often". Killham positively regarded the visual variety, while Stanton considered the animations "nice". However, Stanton also labeled Double D as "not a great-looking game", and Hancock criticized the visuals as "bordering on generic". Contrarily, Sanchez considered them "cool" and apt for the game. Stanton praised the sound design as effective, while Hancock labeled the music "generic". Farquhar experienced "mushy and unresponsive" controls and input lag in Double D; long loading times and occasional frame rate issues were reported for the Xbox 360 version of XXL by others.
