= Serious Sam: Shatterverse =

2026 video game

- Developer: Behaviour Interactive
- Publisher: Devolver Digital
- Producer: Nic Duchesne
- Composer: Nicolas Marquis
- Series: Serious Sam
- Platforms: PlayStation 5; Windows; Xbox Series X/S
- Release: 31 August 2026
- Genres: First-person shooter, roguelite
- Mode: Multiplayer

Serious Sam: Shatterverse is a 2026 multiplayer first-person shooter and roguelite game developed by Behaviour Interactive and published by Devolver Digital. It was announced in March 2026 and was released in August for the PlayStation 5, Windows, and the Xbox Series X/S.

== Gameplay ==
Serious Sam: Shatterverse is a first-person shooter and roguelite game in a cooperative multiplayer setting. Up to five people play as versions of the titular Serious Sam from alternate dimensions. They engage in wave-based fights across procedurally generated runs. In each run, they can enhance their arsenal through upgrades.

== Development and release ==
Serious Sam: Shatterverse was developed by Behaviour Interactive with the blessing of Croteam, the creators of the series. According to the producer Nic Duchesne, the studio sought to produce an original approach to the series while upholding its legacy. The game was announced as part of the Xbox Partner Preview on 26 March 2026 amid the 25th-anniversary celebrations of the Serious Sam series. Devolver Digital was set to publish the game for the PlayStation 5, Windows, and the Xbox Series X/S, as well as the Xbox Cloud Gaming service. John Dick, who voiced Sam in the previous games, returned for Shatterverse. Serious Sam: Shatterverse was released on 31 August 2026.

== Reception ==
Reception

Aggregate scores
Aggregator	Score
Metacritic	(PC) 50/100
OpenCritic	21% recommend

The PC version of Serious Sam: Shatterverse received "mixed or average" from critics, according to the review aggregation website Metacritic. Fellow review aggregator OpenCritic assessed that the game received weak approval, being recommended by 21% of critics.
