= Serious Sam: Kamikaze Attack! =

2011 video game

- Developer: Be-Rad Entertainment
- Publisher: Devolver Digital
- Designer: Brad Johnson
- Programmer: Brad Johnson
- Artist: Stephan Royer
- Series: Serious Sam
- Engine: Unity
- Platforms: Android, iOS, Windows
- Release: Android, iOS; September 15, 2011; Windows; January 24, 2012
- Genre: Auto-running
- Mode: Single-player

Serious Sam: Kamikaze Attack! is a 2011 auto-running game developed by Be-Rad Entertainment and published by Devolver Digital. The player controls a Headless Kamikaze that chases after Sam "Serious" Stone, attempting to defeat him. The character moves automatically and can dodge or deflect incoming hazards. Announced in March 2011 and developed over six months, Kamikaze Attack! was created as part of the Serious Sam Indie Series to promote the launch of Serious Sam 3: BFE. It debuted for Android and iOS in September 2011, followed by a release for Windows in January 2012. The game received a mixed reception, with praise for its controls, conflicting opinions about its visuals, and criticism for its repetitiveness and lack of appeal to non-fans of the Serious Sam series.

== Gameplay ==
The player character (left) chasing after Sam. The objective is to strike Sam with deflected hazards.

Serious Sam: Kamikaze Attack! is an auto-running game in a style similar to Canabalt and Robot Unicorn Attack. It puts the player in control of a Headless Kamikaze (or Beheaded Kamikaze), a decapitated humanoid figure wielding bombs that acts as an enemy in other Serious Sam games. There are forty levels, split between desert and jungle environments. In each, the character traverses a two-dimensional world in continuous motion. Their speed increases progressively.

The primary goal is to chase after and defeat Sam "Serious" Stone (the protagonist of the Serious Sam series) after surmounting a pre-determined distance. In between, the Headless Kamikaze faces several hazards, including cacti, frogs, rockets, bombs, grenades, gaps, and fences. These may be avoided by jumping over them, and some can be destroyed or deflected using the kick ability, which fills the "rage meter" that can ultimately kill the character. It automatically drains while not in use. The Headless Kamikaze has multiple (initially three) lives; depleting them causes the player to lose. Certain collectibles may add additional lives; others can instantly empty the rage meter, reset the character's speed, or add multipliers to the score. When jumping over obstacles, holding down the button prolongs the leap, and a second one can be initiated while in the air.

Every level includes an optional bonus objective consisting of kicking one type of object a certain number of times. Achieving these unlocks gameplay modifiers, including a higher frequency of collectibles and faster drainage of the rage meter. Later stages are made more difficult by incorporating more hazards. "Endless" modes have no exit condition, with the player aiming only for the highest possible score through the bonus objective. High scores could be shared via the OpenFeint and Game Center services.

== Development and release ==
Serious Sam: Kamikaze Attack! was developed by Be-Rad Entertainment, an indie game studio founded by programmer Brad Johnson. It was Be-Rad's second game, having previously released Lame Castle. After Devolver Digital, the publisher of the Serious Sam series, had come across Lame Castle, the company approached Johnson, asking him to develop a game as part of the Serious Sam Indie Series, a triplet of spin-offs to be created by small studios to promote the impending launch of Serious Sam 3: BFE. The Indie Series also encompasses Serious Sam Double D and Serious Sam: The Random Encounter. He considered this a "no-brainer" and accepted the request. Be-Rad decided to create an auto-running game, given the experience they had gathered with Lame Castle and because Johnson thought that such gameplay would better suit mobile phones. He also ruled out making a first-person shooter, as this genre was already covered by the main entries in the Serious Sam series.

Kamikaze Attack! uses the Unity game engine. Johnson repurposed some code from Lame Castle, which allowed him time to add further features and apply polish to Kamikaze Attack!. Its art assets were hand-drawn with colored pencils by Stephan Royer. Be-Rad intended to keep players engaged in the game longer than in others in the genre by adding objectives and boss fights. They also implemented role-playing elements, such as character upgrades, but removed them after playtesting showed that they provided no benefit. The studio was given substantial creative control, receiving only feedback on the visual design for Sam. Though production had been planned to last two months, it was completed in six. Kamikaze Attack! was designed to run on the Android and iOS mobile operating systems. A Windows Phone port was not considered because Unity did not support the platform.

The Serious Sam Indie Series was announced by Devolver Digital in March 2011. An early version of Kamikaze Attack! was exhibited at the PAX East trade show later that month. A free demo was playable on the promotional website for Serious Sam 3: BFE, starting in July 2011. Two trailers were published: one in July 2011 to demonstrate the gameplay, and another in September to coincide with the launch. The game launched for Android and iOS on September 15, 2011. The iOS version, a "universal" app compatible with both iPhone and iPad devices, was distributed through the App Store, arriving first in New Zealand. It became available on the Android Market and was additionally made compatible with Xperia Play devices. To commemorate the release, Be-Rad temporarily supplied Lame Castle for iPad devices at no cost. Shortly after the game's release, Johnson stated that most players of Kamikaze Attack! had pirated the game.

Kamikaze Attack! was offered as freeware on Android through the Amazon Appstore on November 29, 2011, becoming the storefront's most downloaded free app that day. At this time, this version requested the Android-specific "GET_TASKS" permission that Johnson stated was required to use the mobile advertising component Mobclix. The use of this permission caused concern among some users, who left one-star reviews (the lowest possible rating) on the game's Amazon Appstore page, claiming it to be spyware. Be-Rad consequently created a build without this permission, which was quickly approved. A Windows port of Kamikaze Attack! debuted on January 24, 2012, as part of the "Serious Sam Lightning Pack", a collection of games offered at a reduced price on the website Indie Royale. In this collection, Kamikaze Attack! was delivered with no digital rights management and through the Desura service. By 2020, Kamikaze Attack! had been withdrawn from sale on mobile storefronts, while Desura had become defunct. The game was re-released for Windows via Steam on July 27, 2021. The new version removed all microtransactions, updated the graphics, added features such as achievements, and fixed several bugs. Further improvements and bug fixes came with a patch later that month.

== Reception ==
Reception

Aggregate score
Aggregator	Score
Metacritic	67/100

Review scores
Publication	Score
Gamezebo	3.5/5
Pocket Gamer	3.5/5; 4/5 (Xperia Play)
TouchArcade	3.5/5
AppSpy	4/5
Slide to Play	2/4

Serious Sam: Kamikaze Attack! received "mixed or average reviews", according to the review aggregator website Metacritic, which calculated a weighted average rating of 67/100 based on six critic reviews. It was GameFly's "app of the day" on June 12, 2012. Some critics found that the hand-drawn graphics were appealing and fit its overall aesthetic, with Gamezebo writer Kevin Alexander stating that they "come to life in a simple but effective manner". Andrew Nesvadba (AppSpy) called the visuals "stunning" but noted that they could cause some "confusion". Jason D'Aprile (Slide to Play) described the graphics as an "odd mix of primitive and quaint".

Commenting on the controls, Alexander thought them to be "responsive", while Chris Schilling (Pocket Gamer) opined that they were "immaculate". Schilling, who considered Kamikaze Attack! to be one of the better games in the auto-running genre, also lauded it for its "authentic" audio design. Conversely, Andrew Hayward (GamesRadar) criticized the use of only one music track. Hayward and D'Aprile also faulted the shortage of art assets. Further criticism highlighted the repetitiveness of the game, as Schilling and Thorin Klosowski (TouchArcade) each saw a lack of variety between the individual levels, including the endless modes. D'Aprile observed this as its biggest problem. Many agreed that Kamikaze Attack! was a good fit for the Serious Sam franchise, although they believed it would have limited appeal to players with no background knowledge of the series.
