= Serious Sam II =

2005 video game

- Developer: Croteam
- Publisher: 2K Games
- Producer: Roman Ribarić
- Designers: Davor Hunski; Davor Tomičić; Tomislav Pongrac
- Programmer: Alen Ladavac
- Artist: Admir Elezović
- Composer: Damjan Mravunac
- Series: Serious Sam
- Engine: Serious Engine 2
- Platforms: Windows, Xbox
- Release: NA: 11 October 2005; PAL: 14 October 2005
- Genre: First-person shooter
- Modes: Single-player, multiplayer

Serious Sam II (also marketed as Serious Sam 2) is a 2005 first-person shooter game developed by Croteam and published by 2K Games. It is the third main entry in the Serious Sam series, after Serious Sam: The First Encounter (2001) and Serious Sam: The Second Encounter (2002). The game follows Sam "Serious" Stone as he seeks to assemble the five-piece Medallion of Power, the only tool able to weaken his nemesis, the alien overlord Mental, who has each piece guarded by his forces. As Sam, the player traverses forty-two levels across seven thematic worlds and fights increasingly large waves of enemies with an expanding arsenal, vehicles, and turrets. In multiplayer, up to sixteen players can play the campaign cooperatively or engage in deathmatch.

Serious Sam II and its proprietary engine, Serious Engine 2, entered development after the completion of The Second Encounter in early 2002, occupying twenty-eight people by the end of the year. The engine incorporated a bespoke physics engine and support for higher-quality graphics over the prior games. Engine licences contributed to a larger game budget that allowed Croteam to hire voice actors, and the studio chose to use a cartoonish art style. Serious Sam II became one of the first releases of 2K Games, which had since succeeded the original games' publisher, Gathering of Developers. The game was released for Windows and the Xbox in October 2005, while an Xbox 360 version was forgone.

Serious Sam II was met with mixed reviews. It was praised for its improvements over its predecessors, including its high-action gameplay, while being criticised for a low replay value. The vehicles and turrets each raised differing opinions, as did its level design, humour, voice acting, and music. The graphics drew positive remarks, although the enemy designs attained mixed responses. The reduced multiplayer options, including initially no deathmatch mode, were seen as a negative. The shift to a cartoonish art style was polarising among fans, and Serious Sam 3: BFE (2011) became a prequel to The First Encounter.

== Gameplay ==
Sam fighting several enemies, including a Spider Mechanoid, with a minigun

Serious Sam II is a first-person shooter with an optional third-person perspective. As Sam "Serious" Stone, the player traverses forty-two enclosed levels distributed across seven thematic episodes, starting on the planet of M'Digbo. In each level, the player faces increasingly large waves of enemies with more variety as the game progresses. It employs large numbers of enemies at a time and occasionally uses set pieces. Individual foes may teleport into the level or be brought in by dropships. Opponents give off distinct audio cues that help the player to identify their direction of attack. Many charge the player directly, others are airborne. There are forty-two enemy types in total, with some limited to certain worlds. These include original creations and redesigns of enemies from earlier games in the series. The final level of each world features a boss.

The player starts with a circular saw, a laser pistol, and two revolvers, later expanding their arsenal with shotguns, submachine guns, a sniper rifle, and a rocket launcher, among others. The revolvers and Uzis support dual wield. (Note: Dual-wielding was expanded to all weapons in a 2021 update.) Clawdovic, (Note: "Clawdovic" is a reference to the Croatian name of the parrot featured in the Alan Ford comic book.) a bird strapped with an explosive, homes in on a nearby enemy when deployed. The Serious Bomb, which is found rarely, defeats every enemy in a certain radius. Alongside any weapon, the player can toss grenades with a dedicated key. Ranged weapons other than the revolvers have limited ammunition. This may be replenished through items placed around each level, dispensed by non-player characters (NPCs), and found in destructible crates. Other props, such as trees and buildings, are also destructible.

Some areas require the player to clear all threats before being able to proceed. In others, they must protect NPCs, solve a simple puzzle, or pass a platforming section. Occasionally, the player is given a stationary minigun or turret. Vehicles, such as the weaponed dinosaur and hovercraft, have unlimited ammunition and enable the player to travel faster. With the spike-equipped rollerball, the player inflicts damage on enemies they crash into. When the player runs out of health, they lose a life and return to the most recent checkpoint. The game features five difficulty levels, peaking at "Serious" difficulty. The Xbox version additionally includes an aim assist.

In multiplayer, the campaign can be played cooperatively with up to sixteen players in the Windows version and up to four players on the Xbox, either locally connected via System Link or online through the Xbox Live service. Each player has a customisable number of lives and, upon death, they are immediately brought to the other players. The difficulty of the levels adjusts itself to the number of players in the session. When one player finishes a stage and enters into the next, all others automatically follow along. Xbox Live further allowed players to enter their scores into online leaderboards. Following the service's shutdown, it was unofficially succeeded by the third-party Insignia service.

== Plot ==
Following Serious Sam: The Second Encounter, the exiled Sirian Great Council is observing the efforts of the soldier Sam "Serious" Stone (voiced by John Dick) to track down and defeat the alien overlord Mental. Believing Sam is the only one capable of achieving this, they summon him and task him with retrieving the five pieces of the Medallion of Power, an ancient artefact that is solely able to make Mental vulnerable. The pieces, indestructible and distributed among the peoples of five planets, have since come under the control of Mental's forces, who continue to guard them in place. The council sends Sam to the planet of M'Digbo, the home of the Simbas, where his implanted artificial intelligence, NETRICSA (Elly Fairman), helps him to communicate with the locals by translating their language. In M'Keke Village, the village chief informs Sam that Kwongo, a giant monkey, had taken their piece. Sam frees the village shaman from Kukulele Prison in the nearby city of Ursul, who summons Kwongo for Sam to defeat.

With the first piece acquired, the Sirian Great Council takes Sam to the planet of Magnor. As the location of the Zixie tribe and their piece is unknown, Sam instead arrives at one of Mental's swamp outposts. After he is briefly captured by Mental's forces, a Zixie frees him and takes him to their village. Mental's forces discover the village shortly after his arrival, and Zumzum, a giant bee, steals the piece before Sam can reach it. He follows Zumzum into the Land of Giants and kills it to retrieve the second piece. On the planet of Chi-Fang, he hunts Prince Chan, who terrorises and regularly eats the local ChiChe population and has since swallowed the third piece. Sam finds Prince Chan at his temple and murders him to obtain it. On the planet of Kleer, Sam acquires the fourth piece by killing the evil wizard Kleerofski.

For the final piece, the Sirian Great Council sends Sam to the planet of Ellenier, where the Elvians have lost the piece to Cecil the Dragon (Brian Bowles). He treks to the city of Kingsburg, through the sewers, and into the Castle of Rock to confront the Elvian king about Cecil's location. As he arrives, Cecil kidnaps Princess Olga from her wedding, such that the king demands that Sam follow the dragon and rescue her. He complies but finds the dragon willing to return the princess, as both find her to be unsightly. Sam initially refuses to take her and defeats Cecil in the ensuing fight, but he offers to return the princess in exchange for the fifth piece, to which he reluctantly agrees.

With all five pieces in his possession, Sam heads to Kronos, a small moon orbiting Sirius. The moon harbours imprisoned resistance fighters, which Sam frees, and the galaxy's most powerful laser cannon, which he uses to damage the otherwise impenetrable shield around Sirius. The hole closes after Sam flies through it, leaving him as the sole fighter heading to Sirius. In the city of Siriusopolis, he is captured by Mental's forces and put through a series of televised arena battles before being rescued by allied fighters, who reactivated the laser on Kronos to join him on Sirius. Sam battles his way to Mental's residence, the Mental Institution, and blindly fires at Mental therein. When the lights turn on, he discovers that he has merely shot a speaker, and he departs with the spaceship that was hidden inside.

== Development and release ==
The Croatian studio Croteam began rudimentary work on Serious Engine 2, the second iteration of its proprietary game engine, after completing Serious Sam: The Second Encounter in early 2002. With the finalisation of the Xbox compilation of Serious Sam: The First Encounter and The Second Encounter later that year, twenty-eight people became engrossed in the engine and Serious Sam II. The development was partially funded by the income from the studio's prior engine, which had been licensed to more than ten companies for over twenty products. Serious Engine 2 was written anew under the auspices of the technical director Alen Ladavac "to meet demands of modern technology". The team bore in mind the knowledge from building its predecessor and the features it sought for the game. The newer engine added a custom physics engine (dubbed "Serious Physics"), support for models with higher polygon counts, and a dynamic lighting system. Despite the latter, shadow maps were chosen over the more complex dynamically generated shadows. Shader usage was optimised to ensure that having many enemies on the screen simultaneously did not impact the performance. Therein, several versions of the High-Level Shader Language were used to support older hardware. Other new features included bloom, refraction, and parallax mapping. The feature set eventually extended beyond what Croteam needed for Serious Sam II to entice potential licensees.

In September 2002, Croteam announced Serious Sam II as a "true sequel" to both prior games, shifting away from their episodic structure, with a release on Windows and the Xbox planned for 2003. Davor Hunski, the lead designer, conceived the base game design before shifting to programming. The game was designed with seven episodes to have a longer playtime than the two previous games combined. The studio deliberately kept the enemy artificial intelligence simple, prioritising quantity over quality. The storyline was considered unimportant and only implemented as a bridge between the episodes, such that they did not feel like separate games. The game's tone was turned more comedic and cartoonish with influences from the externally developed Serious Sam: Next Encounter. With a larger game budget, Croteam hired additional voice actors in Elly Fairman and Brian Bowles.

Roman Ribarić, Croteam's chief executive officer, reiterated in August 2003 that Serious Sam II was in development for Windows and said it was scheduled for 2004, with an Xbox version planned for later. In September, he expected it to be completed in the second quarter of 2004. Croteam presented a video-only tech demo at the ATI and DirectX booths at the Game Developers Conference in March 2004. The demo largely focused on the Orc Footballer enemy. ATI had supported Croteam in the development of the engine's 3D rendering implementation. The studio later partnered with ATI's competitor Nvidia, introducing high-dynamic-range rendering for machines with Nvidia graphics cards. Nvidia used Serious Sam II to benchmark its GeForce 7800 GTX. Despite the sponsorship, Admir Elezović, Croteam's art director, exclaimed that ATI card owners would not be deliberately subjected to an inferior experience and that only poorer drivers could be to blame.

With no commercial level editor suitable for Serious Engine 2, Croteam chose to create proprietary tooling with Serious Editor 2. It was largely reworked from the previous Serious Editor with a focus on versatility to not limit its use to Serious Sam II. The option to pause and modify a running game state was a major addition, as were the Serious Macro Scripts, a high-level scripting language for designers to more easily control gameplay scenarios, including battles. Serious Sam II's designers were given extensive creative liberties over how they created individual fights with this system. Serious Editor 2 contains several editors—including for meshes, animations, destructions, and fonts—and is extensible through plugins. Solely models had to be created in external programs and imported into the editor. Supporting imports from commercial computer-aided design programs was planned but scrapped due to time constraints. Similarly, multiplayer voice chat and some vehicles were dropped late in the development, while the final boss level was added "at the last moment". Split-screen multiplayer was left out as it appeared infeasible on the Xbox.

Gathering of Developers, a publishing label of Take-Two Interactive, was due to publish Serious Sam II before it was shut down and, after several internal mergers, Take-Two established 2K Games in January 2005. It was announced as the publisher of Serious Sam II in April 2005 and showcased it at the E3 trade show in May. To promote it, 2K Games released a trailer in June and highlighted the multiplayer features in August 2005. Later that month, it launched a dedicated website and displayed the game at QuakeCon. 2K Games petitioned Guinness World Records to recognise Serious Sam II for the most enemies simultaneously displayed in a video game and commissioned the comic book artist Greg Horn to produce 8,000 signed copies of an original print. Serious Sam II was released to manufacturing on 21 September 2005, followed by a demo released a week later. The demo features one level with one vehicle and ten weapons.

Serious Sam II's list price was raised above the predecessor's $20 to lessen the potential appearance of a low-quality title. Initially stated to be $50, it was ultimately set to $30 for the Windows version and $40 on the Xbox. Serious Sam II was released for both platforms in North America on 11 October 2005. A PAL version followed on 14 October. With Serious Engine 2 compatible with Linux, Croteam announced that a Linux port would be released after receiving more polishing work. A Mac OS port was not planned, whereas an Xbox 360 version was forgone because the original Xbox was already an established platform. Post-release development was to focus largely on adding a deathmatch multiplayer mode and continuing to improve Serious Editor 2. Updates for both were released in early 2006.

== Reception ==
Reception

Aggregate score
Aggregator	Score	
Aggregator	PC	Xbox
Metacritic	74/100	72/100

Review scores
Publication	Score	
Publication	PC	Xbox
Computer Gaming World	4.5/5	N/A
Eurogamer	7/10	N/A
GamePro	N/A	4.0/5
GameSpot	6.9/10	6.6/10
GameSpy	3.5/5	3.5/5
GameZone	8.0/10	N/A
IGN	8.2/10	8/10
PALGN	N/A	7.0/10
PC Gamer (US)	75%	N/A
X-Play	4/5	N/A

Serious Sam II received "mixed or average reviews", according to the review aggregator website Metacritic, which calculated weighted average ratings of 74/100 for the Windows version and 72/100 for the Xbox release. Jason D'Aprile said on G4 that it was an improvement over its predecessors, citing fun in the unadulterated action, despite it presenting smaller battles with higher difficulties than its predecessors. GameSpy's Justin Leeper said it excelled in "pure carnage". Editors of the UK Official Xbox Magazine labelled it a "massively rewarding experience ... a hard-as-nails blaster that somehow never really gets monotonous". Edge believed no other game at the time matched its intensity. Jonathan Kaharl, in a 2020 retrospective for Hardcore Gaming 101, believed the shorter levels and smaller battles allowed it to present more variety across levels. Gabe Graziani, writing for the US Official Xbox Magazine, stated that this variety created a good pace. In contrast, Kieron Gillen of Eurogamer considered Serious Sam II so repetitive that it was physically draining, whereas Game Informer's Matt Helgeson called it tiresome after longer play sessions. A low replay value was also cited by Luke Van Leuveren of PALGN, Sidney Shuman of GamePro, and Steven Hopper of GameZone. GameSpy's Sal Accardo further felt that Serious Sam II lacked the highlight battles and originality of the prior games, adding to its repetitiveness. Brett Todd of PC Gamer believed the level design too closely resembled other games of the time, although Van Leuveren called it "incredible". CNET's Michael Tan summarised it to be a good diversion that was "ultimately unfulfilling".

Graziani likened the graphics to a "smooth river of visual silk", while D'Aprile labelled them "fantastic". Likewise, Gillen welcomed the "gloriously weird" worlds, which Leeper called "stunning". Todd and Butts commended the level visuals in particular. Dirk van Genechten of Gamesplanet identified low-quality visuals on larger enemies and in cutscenes. Accardo highlighted the low resolution of the pre-rendered cutscenes. Butts and Yahoo!'s Alex Pullman recognised the lower-quality models as a necessity for a good performance with the high numbers of enemies visible at a time. Van Leuveren liked the designs despite the lower detail. Gillen and Shuman considered them imaginative, with Gillen welcoming the colourfulness at a time of many brown-tinted games. Hopper and D'Aprile furthered this, also positively noting the lighting, textures, and visual effects. Darren Gladstone of Computer Gaming World echoed this sentiment, also highlighting the custom game engine. Accardo praised the performance, although the Edge editors noted it to be "a little groggy" on the Xbox. Butts and van Genechten considered the custom physics implementation inferior to the popular Havok middleware. Although Gillen liked the explosion physics, he believed them to play a too insignificant role in the gameplay. Leeper found the physics frustrating when he struggled to stack boxes to reach a secret. GameSpot's Greg Kasavin commended the destructibility of the environments.

Gillen took issue with the "half-hearted" inclusions of turrets and vehicles. Geson Hatchett of Hardcore Gamer questioned the turrets' usefulness as being stationary exposed the player to greater threats. Tom Orry of VideoGamer.com further lamented that some turret sections lasted too long. Accardo found fun in the vehicles, lamenting only that they were used too rarely. Butts similarly bemoaned that the rollerball did not last enough for its entertainment value to become obvious. While Pullman highlighted the rollerball as the sole fun vehicle, Kasavin felt that none alleviated the level design's monotony. Tan considered the vehicles unimaginative and poorly implemented, and the Official Xbox Magazine editors criticised their handling. In contrast, Hopper and Leeper liked both the vehicles and turrets. Kasavin further criticised the Xbox aim assist for taking away from the challenge while also being required as the game was otherwise too difficult. PALGN's Luke Van Leuveren, on the other hand, called the feature a "godsend". Of the multiplayer aspects, Accardo presented the cooperative campaign as one of the highlights, although Tan and Butts lamented the lack of a split-screen option. Butts, D'Aprile, and the Official Xbox Magazine editors were disappointed by the lack of a deathmatch mode at the time of release.

According to Tim Wapshott of The Times, "the experience is convincingly upbeat thanks to the game's droll sense of humour". Van Leuveren specified that "whilst there are some genuinely humorous moments during the game, the humour is only spot on about half the time". Orry, Leeper, and Kasavin disliked the jokes overall. Eliot Fish wrote in The Sydney Morning Herald that Serious Sam II made "the mistake of assuming that bigger is always better", adding that "The first Serious Sam was tongue-in-cheek but this sequel crosses the line into obnoxiousness." Conversely, Butts considered NETRICSA's comments "genuinely funny" and Helgeson described character dialogues as "loveably cheesy". The Official Xbox Magazine editors enjoyed the mocking references to other games, which Shuman considered the biggest asset. Accardo and Tan felt that the plot was solely an excuse for the ensuing action. While Leeper said that he could not complain about the voice actors, Hopper found them "very cheesy" and annoying, even given the tone. Leeper commended the use of audio cues, and D'Aprile and Todd described the soundtrack as "forgettable" and "unique", respectively.

== Legacy ==
The change to a cartoonish art style and comedic tone were divisive among fans of the series. The subsequent entry, Serious Sam 3: BFE, became a prequel to The First Encounter instead of continuing Serious Sam II's story. According to Ribarić, Croteam considered it important to "build upon the existing Serious Sam legend and expand on some of Sam's earlier adventures to explain how in the hell he got into the situations you've already played through". In October 2011, the company stated plans to remake Serious Sam II with overhauled graphics and gameplay "to make it like it should have been", despite the positive feedback garnered from fans over the years. Devolver Digital, Croteam's later publishing partner, re-released Serious Sam II digitally via Steam on 31 January 2012. The release remained mostly unaltered to not disappoint the existing fanbase. It was updated in June 2014 to replace the defunct GameSpy networking component with Steam's Steamworks. In March 2021, as part of the series's 20th-anniversary celebrations, a major update largely developed by the community member Nathan "DwK" Brown introduced two further weapons, dual wield for all guns, and twelve previously unreleased multiplayer maps, among bug fixes and minor gameplay changes. Brown also added his mod InSamnity! 2 to the game. Another major update came with the game's 20th anniversary in October 2025, implementing reworked HUD textures and the Renovation mod that enacts various visual enhancements. Achievements were added in February 2026.
