= KarmaZoo =

- Developer: Pastagames
- Publisher: Devolver Digital
- Engine: Linguini
- Platforms: Windows; Nintendo Switch; PlayStation 5; Xbox Series X/S
- Release: 14 November 2023
- Genre: Platform
- Mode: Multiplayer

KarmaZoo is a 2023 platform game developed by Pastagames and published by Devolver Digital. It is a co-operative platform video game in which groups of players must work together to traverse stages. Upon release, KarmaZoo received generally favorable reviews.

== Gameplay ==
Gameplay screenshot

In the main game mode, 'Loop', up to four players co-operate to complete four stages from a pool of 300. Players must traverse the stages and complete puzzles whilst avoiding hazards such as spikes. Completion of co-operative activities earns all players Karma, a resource that can be used to unlock new characters. KarmaZoo also contains 'Totem', a party mode.

== Development ==
KarmaZoo was developed by Pastagames, a Paris-based French independent development studio led by lead designer Nadim Haddad. Haddad stated the inspiration for making a non-competitive co-operative game was colonies of emperor penguins and working together to share problems. Developed over seven years, Haddad stated the design objective of the game was to create a purely co-operative title in which players could not defy or sabotage other players.

== Reception ==
Reception

Aggregate score
Aggregator	Score
Metacritic	79/100 (PC); 77/100 (PS5)

Review scores
Publication	Score
TouchArcade	4/5 stars
TheGamer	3/5 stars
Checkpoint Gaming	8/10
Siliconera	6/10

KarmaZoo received "generally favorable" reviews, according to review aggregator Metacritic.
