= 4mat =

British electronic musician, sound designer, and video game composer

- Born: Matthew Simmonds
- Origin: United Kingdom
- Genres: Electronic music, chiptune
- Occupation(s): Composer, musician, sound designer
- Years active: 1989–present
- Website: 4mat.bandcamp.com

Matthew Simmonds, also known as 4mat or 4-Mat, is an English electronic musician, sound designer, and video game composer best known for his chiptunes written in tracker software. He began his career in the demoscene of the early 1990s composing on the Amiga.

== Discography ==
=== Demo scene ===
- L.F.F., as the theme music on Skid Row's cracktro for Lemmings (1991)

=== Albums ===
- Decades (2010)
- Surrender (2011)
- Legacy Trails (2011)
- Extras (2011)
- Origins (2012)
- Rips (2012)
- Guru (2012)
- Sans Titre (2012)
- Closure (2012)
- Nadir (2014)
- Modern Closure (2019)

=== EPs ===
- Starfields (2010)

== Video game credits ==
4mat has been credited on the following games:

- CarVup (1990)
- Violator (1991)
- Chuck Rock (1991)
- Micro Machines (1991)
- Leander (1991)
- The Fantastic Adventures of Dizzy (1991)
- Dizzy: Prince of the Yolkfolk (1991)
- Cardiaxx (1991)
- Bubble Dizzy (1991)
- Dojo Dan (1992)
- Cosmic Spacehead (1992)
- Arcade Smash Hits (1992)
- Agony (1992)
- Llamazap (1993)
- X-COM: UFO Defense (1994)
- Pinball Dreams II (1994)
- Perfect Pinball (1995)
- Chicago Syndicate (1995)
- Diablo (1996)
- Manic Miner (1997 remake)
- Warcraft II: The Dark Saga (1997)
- San Francisco Rush (PlayStation) (1998)
- Splat! (1998)
- Sim Theme Park (1999)
- Klass of 1999 (1999)
- Jet Set Willy (1999)
- Warriors of Might and Magic (2000)
- LEGO Racers (2000)
- LEGO Alpha Team (2000)
- Battlezone: Rise of the Black Dogs (2000)
- Airforce Delta (2000)
- SpongeBob SquarePants: SuperSponge (2001)
- Robot Wars: Arenas of Destruction (2001)
- Robot Wars: Extreme Destruction (2002)
- SX Superstar (2003)
- Lunar Jetman (2003)
- Serious Sam: Next Encounter (2004)
- Serious Sam Advance (2004)
- Sudeki (2004)
- Jetpak: Solar Crisis (2004)
- Nicktoons Unite! (GBA and DS versions) (2005)
- ViColumn (2005)
- Who Wants to Be a Millionaire: Party Edition (2006)
- Retro 2 (2006)
- Fuck Space! (2006)
- Deflektor X4 (2006)
- Crusty Demons (2006)
- The Birthday (2006)
- Atic Atac (2006 remake)
- Silent Hill: Origins (2007)
- Ghost Rider (2007)
- Silent Hill: Shattered Memories (2009)
- Overlord: Minions (2009)
- Overlord: Dark Legend (2009)
- Rocket Knight (2010)
- Digital: A Love Story (2010)
- Terminal Love (2012)
- Prompt (2014)
- The Assembly (2016)
