= Serious Sam: Tormental =

2022 video game

- Developer: Gungrounds
- Publisher: Devolver Digital
- Director: Kristian Macanga
- Designer: Kristian Macanga
- Programmers: Kristian Macanga; Guy Unger; Ivan Gabriel Juričić; Goran Tomašić
- Artists: Guy Unger; Menno Stas; Ana Marija Lončar; Goran Tomašić
- Writers: Darkcola, MD
- Composers: Damjan Mravunac; Jukio Kallio; Sanja Dorić
- Series: Serious Sam
- Engine: Unity
- Platform: Windows
- Release: 8 April 2022
- Genres: Twin-stick shooter, rogue-lite
- Modes: Single-player, multiplayer

Serious Sam: Tormental is a 2022 twin-stick shooter and rogue-lite game developed by Gungrounds and published by Devolver Digital. One or two players traverse procedurally generated levels across several stages set in the mind of Mental, the antagonist of the Serious Sam series. They use two weapons each, of which the primary weapon can be enhanced through "mods" found throughout the game. The unlockable player characters can perform dodge rolls and a unique special ability. Upon the player character's defeat, the player is reset to the start of the game. After completing all stages, the players can use black keys to unlock power-ups from a vault. The stages then loop with increasing difficulty.

Gungrounds initially developed Spitfire Inferno with inspiration from Geometry Wars. After exhibiting the game at several video game conferences, the studio became part of Croteam Incubator, the development team expanded, and the game's theme was shifted to the Serious Sam series. Spitfire Inferno was renamed Tormental, then Serious Sam: Tormental. It was made available in early access in April 2019 and released in April 2022. The game received mixed reviews, with praise for its humour, art, and combat, and criticism towards technical issues, repetitiveness, and lack of innovation.

== Gameplay ==
The player, as NETRICSA (centre), fighting several enemies

Serious Sam: Tormental is a twin-stick shooter with rogue-lite elements. It takes place within the mind of Mental, the antagonist of the Serious Sam series. Mental's frontal lobe serves as a hub area. The player chooses from one of several player characters, starting with Sam "Serious" Stone and unlocking further characters during gameplay. They traverse procedurally generated rooms within multiple thematic stages. Each room contains enemies that need to be defeated before the player can progress. These enemies use either melee or projectiles, both of which inflict damage on the player character. The character can simultaneously use two weapons: a primary weapon with readily available ammunition and a "serious" weapon with high power and limited bullets. The primary weapon can be enhanced through "mods" either found in chests or purchased at shops that appear within stages. Chests provide three random upgrades to choose from, while shops require the spending of the currency obtained by defeating enemies. Upgrades include bullets that ignite enemies and a rate of fire increase in exchange for a lowered damage per bullet.

To evade enemies and projectiles, the player character can perform a dodge roll. Large enemies with low health may be defeated with such a roll, which grants better rewards than a regular kill. The player can also activate bombs placed in rooms, which inflict damage on both the character and enemies. Between rooms, characters can be freed using previously collected golden keys to make them selectable at the start of the game. Each character has a unique special ability, such as Sam, who can jump over hazards. A boss occurs at the end of each stage. When the player character's health is depleted, gameplay pauses and the player is reset to the start of the game with all weapons and upgrades revoked. Over time, the player collects thirty-two black keys used to unlock power-ups in the vault, which occurs after completing all stages once. These power-ups become permanently available to find during regular gameplay. After the vault, the stages loop and the player returns to the first stage with an increased difficulty. The game can be played cooperatively with a second local player.

== Development and release ==
Serious Sam: Tormental was developed by Gungrounds, a Croatian indie game studio. It was the studio's second game after Rocking Pilot, which was co-developed and published by Mad Head Games in May 2017. Kristian Macanga and Guy Unger initially developed a game titled Spitfire or Spitfire Inferno, which they modelled after Geometry Wars. They had previously collaborated on a game for the "Indies VS PewDiePie" game jam held in November 2014. While exhibiting Spitfire Inferno at the Reboot InfoGamer conference in Croatia, it was acknowledged by members of Croteam, who tracked the team's progress across further events—Reboot Develop, the Slovenian Games Conference, and the Central European Games Conference—and eventually invited them to Croteam's business incubator programme. The Gungrounds team grew over time, adding programmers Ivan Gabriel Juričić and Goran Tomašić, as well as artist Ana Marija Lončar, whom the team had met at Reboot InfoGamer 2018. Additionally, Croteam's Roman Ribarić, Andrej Smoljan and Damjan Mravunac acted as producer, sound effects artist and composer, respectively. Gungrounds used the Unity game engine since the team members were already familiar with it and because it supported multiple platforms.

As the expanded team was unhappy with Spitfire Inferno's theme, Ribarić suggested that Gungrounds shift the game to the Serious Sam universe. After choosing Mental's mind as the target setting, the game was renamed Tormental. It drew further influence from Nuclear Throne, The Binding of Isaac, Enter the Gungeon, and other Serious Sam games. Croteam's incubator programme was formally announced as Croteam Incubator in March 2018. At this time, Gungrounds was based in the same Zagreb office as the five other studios in the programme. A prototype of Tormental was exhibited at the April 2018 Reboot Develop conference in Dubrovnik to attract the attention of game designer Rami Ismail, who, after extensively playing the game, gave his detailed impressions to the developers.

Tormental was due to be launched in Steam Early Access in August 2018 but was delayed to allow for quality assurance and the completion of some existing features. A prototype was released as freeware via Itch.io in March 2019. The early access version, now renamed Serious Sam: Tormental, was launched on 2 April 2019 for Windows, with Croteam Incubator acting as the publisher. This version introduced John Dick as the voice actor for Sam. The game was initially intended to remain in early access for 6–12 months, depending on player feedback and prospective further features. Upon the initial release, Gungrounds announced a shortened prospective period of 2–3 months, though noting that it could change based on internal milestones. The studio anticipated bringing the game to the Nintendo Switch, PlayStation 4, and Xbox One should the first release be successful. With the "Fortress Update" released on 8 April 2022, Serious Sam: Tormental was taken out of early access with Devolver Digital as its publisher.

== Reception ==
Reception

Aggregate score
Aggregator	Score
Metacritic	66/100

Review score
Publication	Score
The Games Machine (Italy)	7.1/10

Serious Sam: Tormental received "mixed or average reviews", according to the review aggregator website Metacritic, which calculated a weighted average rating of 66/100 based on five critic reviews. Daniele Cucchiarelli of The Games Machine enjoyed the game's humour and found it to fit with the rest of the series. He commended the expansive arsenal and challenge the game poses, as well as the "nice" and distinguishing art style. KC Nwosu, in his review for The Escapist, similarly enjoyed the art style, which he believed fit the series better than those found in other entries. He regarded the movement and shooting mechanics as "adequate" but lamented that obtained weapons and upgrades "never reach the necessary level of absurdity to excite players to go another run". Cucchiarelli faulted several technical issues and saw the game as failing to be inventive, while Nwosu thought that the game was "incredibly small in scope and gives way to tedium much quicker than its replayable structure should allow".
