= Serious Sam: Siberian Mayhem =

2022 video game

- Developers: Timelock Studio; Croteam
- Publisher: Devolver Digital
- Series: Serious Sam
- Platforms: Windows; PlayStation 5; Xbox Series X/S
- Release: Windows; 25 January 2022; PS5, Xbox Series X/S; 6 October 2022
- Genre: First-person shooter
- Mode: Single-player

Serious Sam: Siberian Mayhem is a 2022 first-person shooter game developed by Timelock Studio and Croteam, and published by Devolver Digital. A standalone expansion to Serious Sam 4, the game was released on 25 January 2022 for Windows, and on 6 October 2022 for PlayStation 5 and Xbox Series X/S.

== Gameplay ==
Serious Sam: Siberian Mayhem is a standalone expansion to Serious Sam 4. The game features five levels and several new weapons.

== Plot ==
Serious Sam: Siberian Mayhem takes place in Russia, somewhere in deep Siberia. The events occur in an alternate timeline of Serious Sam 4, between two of the last levels from the main game.

Set directly after the events of "The Package" mission in Serious Sam 4, Sam "Serious" Stone arrives on the north coast of Russia, aiming to reach Tunguska to stop General Brand, who took possession of the Holy Grail, and to destroy the portal being used by Mental's forces to invade the Earth.

Having arrived on the mainland, Sam attempts to contact the HQ without success. Sam infiltrates an oil refinery that has a signal SOS on a transmission tower. Stone reaches the tower and meets a survivor, but the man is killed. Within the refinery, Sam hears a radio transmission from Igor Ledov, the head of the local partisan squad. Igor is aware of Brand's betrayal and appeals to all armed human units to shoot his plane on sight. Ledov offers Sam help and asks the hero to go to the village Kalinovka to the south, where the squad will be waiting for him.

Heading south, Russian soldiers of Earth Defense Forces locate Brand's plane and shoot it down. Sam travels the Siberian tundra and forests and finds an abandoned village surrounded by Octanian troops where he meets with One-Eye Olga, a legendary Russian sniper who was believed to have been killed during the storming of the portal in Tunguska. Olga reveals she faked her death, hiding in an abandoned church in the meantime and was also responsible for shooting down Brands plane.

Serious Sam continues his journey south through Siberia's tundra and soon reaches Kalinovka. There he meets Ledov's partisan squad: the stern and dense Ivan, the energetic and militant Natasha, the silent Vlad and the leader of the group himself, the former rock musician Igor. Ledov tells Sam that there is an abandoned railway depot on the outskirts of the village, where a working locomotive is present which, they can use to reach the closest town Ustinov and travel to Tunguska from there. Sam and Ledov's partisan squad fight through Kalinovka and reach the depot where they Finally, having beaten off significant enemy resistance, board the train.

On the way, the heroes enjoy Ledov's songs and reminisce about the recently killed Father Mikhail. Soon, the train arrives at the Ustinov station. Ledov says that the squad has to go through the town and reach the hydroelectric dam, from there, raft in boats to the mouth of Tunguska river. Sam with the squad fights his way through the town and stumble upon the remains of another partisan group, in which Ledov recognizes a squad of certain Pavlov guy. Someone or something dealt with these people with unprecedented cruelty. Sam suspects something is wrong, and they are subsequently ambushed by Octanian raiders that bomb the town, undermining a nearby building. General Brand himself, in his monstrous form, suddenly appears, grabs Ivan and tries to convince Sam to join Mental's forces. Ivan harshly dissuades Sam and pays for it with his own life as Sam and the rest of guerrillas open fire on the traitor, but he manages to escape.

Partisans in rage decide to kill Brand by all means and avenge the death of their comrade. Sam tries to dissuade Ledov and his people but are cut off from Sam by a collapsed building, forcing them to split up and intercept Brand on the dam. Alone, Sam decides to get to the dam by a detour. On the way there, he tries once again to contact his friend on the radio, but communications are blocked. Sam finally reaches the dam, but Mentals' forces have overwhelmed Ledov's people. Seeing Sam, Igor tells Sam that it's a trap, but Brand appears, ambushes and throws Sam off the dam. Meanwhile, the enemies knocked down Ledov and surround him. Exhausted and wounded, Igor sacrifices himself to halt the alien's advance.

Sam fights Brand, who stabs himself with the Grail, absorbing its power which transforms him into an even more frightening creature. Despite this, Brand is defeated by Sam. Shortly afterward, a time portal suddenly appears, from where emerges Sam from the future. The future Sam tells Sam that killing General Brand in this timeline will result in a darker fate for the Earth. One-Eye Olga also walks out of the portal and reports that she has killed Napoleon, but this did not affect the future in any way. Future Sam says that he just wanted "someone to shoot that little twerp", and presents Sam and Olga with a new mission, to go to 1352 BC, where Pharaoh Akhenaton has just discovered a buried Sirian ship. The three of them go through the closing portal, and game credits roll.

The post-credits scene shows present Sam who comes out of the time portal, puts Ledov's guitar on the stove next to the graves of all four partisans and, after standing in silence for a while, leaves into the portal again.

== Development ==
Serious Sam: Siberian Mayhem was developed by Timelock Studio, a Russian group composed of long-time members of the Serious Sam modding community, under the oversight of Croteam, the series' creators. The Timelock Studio members had previously not been affiliated with each other but by chance worked together as testers for Serious Sam 4. The team felt that the game's levels set in Russia had unexplored potential and wished to develop them further. With initiative from their team lead Evgeny, they compiled an 80-page design document that they submitted to Croteam in September 2020, just before Serious Sam 4's release. The company greenlit the project as a three-level piece of downloadable content (DLC) for Serious Sam 4, though it later expanded to a standalone expansion as it outgrew the usual scope for DLC. After settling on the name Serious Sam: Siberian Mayhem for the game, the group of modders founded Timelock Studio in 2021. The development pipeline for a retail product marked a shift for the developers: According to director Igor Grinkevich, the workflow for an individual piece of content is creating and then simply releasing it, whereas the development for Siberian Mayhem introduced them to deadlines, marketing, and localisation. Each team member coincidentally had their own speciality, which Grinkevich described as a "wonder". In the design process, the developers sought to combine classic Serious Sam elements with modern ones to make up for faults they found in Serious Sam 4. Secrets and Easter eggs were added spontaneously. Croteam consulted Timelock Studio on creative and technical aspects, including optimisation, while Devolver Digital acted as the game's publisher.

== Release ==
The game was first teased via a 34-second video published to YouTube in December 2021, showing protagonist Sam Stone navigating a frozen landscape. Devolver Digital referenced the video again in early January 2022, stating that it would announce a new Serious Sam entry later that week and release it later that month. The company announced Siberian Mayhem on 10 January 2022 and released it on 25 January for Windows via Steam and GOG.com. Owners of Serious Sam 4 received a 25% discount on the new game.

== Reception ==
Reception

Aggregate score
| Aggregator | Score |
|---|---|
| Metacritic | 70/100 |

Review scores
| Publication | Score |
|---|---|
| GameStar | 70/100 |
| Hardcore Gamer | 4/5 |
| NME | 4/5 |
| Shacknews | 6/10 |
| The Games Machine (Italy) | 7.8/10 |

Serious Sam: Siberian Mayhem received "mixed or average" reviews, according to the review aggregator website Metacritic, which calculated a weighted average rating of 70/100 based on twenty-five critic reviews.
