= Serious Sam: Next Encounter =

2004 video game

- Developer: Climax Solent
- Publisher: Global Star Software
- Director: James Brace
- Producers: Treena Seymour; Matt Cooper
- Designers: Mark Davies; Sam Barlow (Note: Sam Barlow is designated as the lead designer in a making-of published in NGC Magazine, while the game's credits attribute the role to Mark Davies.)
- Programmer: Dave Owens
- Artist: Matt Cooper
- Composers: Rob Bridgett; Tom Colvin; Matt Simmonds
- Series: Serious Sam
- Platforms: GameCube, PlayStation 2
- Release: NA: 14 April 2004; EU: 30 April 2004
- Genre: First-person shooter
- Modes: Single-player, multiplayer

Serious Sam: Next Encounter is a 2004 first-person shooter game developed by Climax Solent and published by Global Star Software. As a spin-off in the Serious Sam series, it follows Sam "Serious" Stone, who tracks an unidentified enemy through ancient Rome, feudal China and Atlantis, and eliminates the forces the enemy controls to eventually uncover their identity. The player controls Sam through enclosed levels, fighting waves of enemies with an assortment of weapons and, occasionally, vehicles. Defeating enemies is a prerequisite to advance in a level, and killing twenty in rapid succession temporarily grants a strength, speed and score boost in a "Super Combo". Two players can complete the campaign cooperatively and up to eight can engage in versus modes.

The game's development, originally under the name Serious Sam: Word to the Mothership, began at Climax Solent with a game engine created for the GameCube. The twenty-strong development team drew influence from previous Serious Sam games, GoldenEye 007, Perfect Dark, Smash TV, Ikari Warriors, and Contra. In later stages of development, the "Super Combo" system was introduced and emphasis was put on improving the frame rate. Global Star Software announced Next Encounter in January 2004 and released it for GameCube and PlayStation 2 in April. The game was met with a mixed reception. While the stable frame rate was praised, the graphics were heavily criticised. The controls and multiplayer modes were well received. Conflicting opinions were raised regarding the game's music and humour, and additional criticism was given to its repetitiveness and level design.

== Gameplay ==
Sam fighting Kleer Skeletons with a pair of Uzis

Serious Sam: Next Encounter is a first-person shooter. The player, controlling Sam "Serious" Stone, traverses enclosed levels frequently composed of narrow corridors and open areas. There are forty-two levels, distributed among three thematic worlds. In each level, the player encounters various enemies, of which some use melee and others fire projectiles at Sam. Foes are teleported into a room and can approach from any side. The player often needs to clear a room of one or more waves of enemies before proceeding to the next room. In other instances, multiple objects need to be collected and inserted into predetermined slots to unlock the way forward. The game also features some platforming elements and secrets hidden within levels.

Next Encounter contains various weapons, among them ten ranged weapons and a chainsaw for melee. By default, Sam brandishes two handguns that have unlimited ammunition. Some guns have several types of ammunition that can be switched between. Holding down the button to fire a weapon causes guns to discharge continuously. With an optional setting, enemies are automatically targeted. Every few levels, the player can use a vehicle—a jeep, submarine, or combine harvester—and kill enemies by running them over or using the vehicle's attached weaponry.

Killing enemies and collecting hidden treasures increases the score. Based on the final score in a level, the player is awarded a medal, where collecting certain amounts of gold medals unlocks additional "lost levels". Killing twenty enemies in quick succession activates a "Super Combo", which increases Sam's movement speed and his weapons' rate of fire and damage against villains, as well as doubles the score obtained for every further enemy. This state lasts approximately ten seconds. When Sam's health is depleted, gameplay pauses, the character is reset to the most recently passed checkpoint, and the player receives a score penalty. A four-step difficulty setting adjusts how easily either Sam or the enemies are defeated.

Two players can complete the campaign cooperatively in a local split-screen mode. There are three versus modes: "Deathmatch", "Pass the Bomb", and "Hold the Flag". On the PlayStation 2, these can be played one-on-one in split-screen or with up to eight players online, while up to four local players can compete via split-screen on the GameCube.

== Plot ==
Serious Sam: Next Encounter is a "side chapter" in the Serious Sam series. It begins as Mental—the antagonist in the series—instructs an unidentified, childlike minion of his not to meddle with Mental's Time-Lock while he is absent. The minion insincerely agrees, eventually using the Time-Lock to travel to an unknown destination. Later, a scientist observes a space-time flux disturbance and calls Sam "Serious" Stone (voiced by John Dick) to his laboratory. The scientist explains the situation and sends Sam to the Colosseum in ancient Rome, where Sam faces and defeats several waves of enemies from Mental's horde. Enraged, the minion orders Sam's execution, when the scientist announces an error with the teleporter and Sam is transported to the villa of Senator Cicero in Rome's outskirts. Sam is tasked with returning to the Colosseum on foot while preparing for future battles. Fighting his way through more of Mental's forces, he progresses into the city and re-enters the Colosseum. With multiple waves of enemies defeated, the minion summons a giant beast known as the Diablotaur. Sam triumphs over it and observes the minion fleeing through a nearby Time-Lock, with Sam following closely behind.

Sam lands near Xifengkou in feudal China. His Neurotronically Implanted Combat Situation Analyzer (NETRICSA) finds that another Time-Lock is present in the region, as well as further enemy forces, although less organised than before. Sam passes over the Great Wall to Juyongguan, then through the desert to Jiayuguan and through the city of Dunhuang to reach the Forbidden City, where NETRICSA finds that the Time-Lock is hidden in a temple in the city centre. Within that temple, Sam encounters and defeats the Subterranean Emperor Hydra and travels further through its Time-Lock, appearing on an isolated island on an ice floe above Atlantis. Sam enters an underground city complex through a steam vent, where NETRICSA records large energy spikes emerging from the Atlantean throne room. Sam is guided there and ascends the throne, when the ground beneath it opens up to his surprise, leading him to fall into a mothership of the Sirian alien race. NETRICSA detects that an unknown entity is trying to start the ship and requests Sam to stop it. In the ship's engine core, he is met with the ship's secret weapon: the Sirian Darklord, a combination of technology and a Sirian warrior. After Sam destroys it, he witnesses the minion exit the Sirian Darklord's head and gives him a spanking. The minion admits that he was responsible for Sam's previous troubles and states that he was an evil clone of Sam and the "ultimate warrior of evil", although he still had to grow up. Unimpressed, Sam takes the clone through a Time-Lock to the laboratory for examination. After they leave, a cloning device in the ship activates, spawning several more copies of the evil clone.

== Development and release ==
Serious Sam: Next Encounter was developed by Climax Group through its Climax Solent studio. The production was initially overseen by Rockstar Games, a publishing label of Take-Two Interactive. According to the game's lead designer, Sam Barlow, the team of around twenty people worked in a positive atmosphere. The development began when Climax Solent received development units of the GameCube and created a game engine for the system. The game was built from scratch for the GameCube and PlayStation 2, such that it did not need to be ported to another platform later on. The game, during development called Serious Sam: Word to the Mothership, drew inspiration from several sources. Previous Serious Sam games were used as the base template, the controls were designed to be as responsive and intuitive as those in GoldenEye 007 and Perfect Dark, the enemy wave designs were influenced by Smash TV, and the vehicles were modelled after those in Ikari Warriors. Producer Matt Cooper also cited Contra as an influence. Original enemy designs were created alongside foes also featured in previous Serious Sam games. The original designs remained exclusive to this game.

Employees kept up morale through playtesting and frequently shared high scores on internal message boards. Additional testers were taken "off the street", some of whom showed significant interest in video games and were difficult to remove from the office after a testing session. The "Super Combo" system was introduced late into development, which Barlow said "completely changed the game" and how it was played by testers. Several elements—including jet packs, wasp enemies, multiplayer vehicle races, and a gun that adopts the powers of enemy projectiles it absorbs—were cut for reasons such as technical limitations and design decisions. Climax Solent occasionally shared its progress with Croteam, the creators of Serious Sam. Near the end of production, artists and programmers were urged to improve the game's frame rate. Global Star Software, Take-Two Interactive's budget-range publishing label, announced Next Encounter for the GameCube and PlayStation 2 in January 2004, alongside Serious Sam Advance for the Game Boy Advance. The company released both games in North America on 14 April 2004. A European release followed on 30 April.

== Reception ==
Reception

Aggregate score
Aggregator	Score	
Aggregator	GameCube	PS2
Metacritic	69/100	65/100

Review scores
Publication	Score	
Publication	GameCube	PS2
Edge	N/A	7/10
Eurogamer	N/A	6/10
Game Informer	7.75/10	N/A
GameRevolution	N/A	D+
GameSpot	N/A	6.5/10
GameZone	6.7/10	7.1/10
IGN	7/10	6.2/10
NGC Magazine	83/100	N/A
Nintendo World Report	5/10	N/A
GMR	N/A	7/10
HomeLAN	N/A	78%

Serious Sam: Next Encounter received "mixed or average reviews", according to the review aggregator website Metacritic, which calculated weighted average ratings of 69/100 for the GameCube release and 65/100 for the PlayStation 2 version. Several critics commended the game's high and stable frame rate but found poor graphics to be the trade-off: Ed Lewis of IGN faulted "simple" textures and low poly models of the enemies and environments, comparing the look to that of games for the original PlayStation, although he felt that the character design was the "best part" of the visuals. Editors of Edge said that the environments lacked intricacy and were "blocky" and "simplistic", Jes Bickham described them as "primitive" in NGC Magazine, and Ryan Davis of GameSpot called them "ugly". Mike David of GameZone found that enemies looked "sloppy" and appeared pixelated or "grainy" when seen up close. HomeLAN's John Callaham cited the graphics as the game's greatest shortcoming, as "the lighting of the game is so flat and the level and art textures so poorly detailed" that he occasionally thought he was playing a game for older consoles. In contrast, Jeff Shirley of Nintendo World Report appreciated the "nice" textures and use of bump mapping. Adam Biessener of Game Informer felt that the graphics were good enough for a budget-priced game.

David and his colleague Scott Kuvin opined that the controls in Next Encounter were aptly designed for the GameCube and PlayStation 2. Bickham called them "robust" for the GameCube version. The Edge editors lauded the auto-aiming functionality for counteracting inaccuracies of the DualShock 2's analogue sticks. Kristan Reed of Eurogamer regarded the enemy wave designs as "one of the most amusingly deranged gaming spectacles of all time". Shirley stated that, although the size of some levels was impressive, it caused much unnecessary traversal over empty areas after conflicts with enemies. The Edge editors opined that the level design was "flat" and further said that the enemies were not executed as well as in past Serious Sam games. Davis said that the game, overall, was not as good as previous entries in the series. Shirley, Lewis, and Reed criticised the game's repetitiveness, with Shirley saying that he felt as though he were repeatedly playing the first level in the game. Bickham labelled the gameplay "one-dimensional". Joe Dodson of GameRevolution disliked the game's use of platforming elements, stating that they had no place in first-person shooters. Dodson and Lewis also said that the "Super Combo" system was poorly implemented and should have allowed the player to extend the phase with higher kill streaks.

Biessener thought that the multiplayer modes added some replay value to the game, even if they were not innovative. Bickham particularly liked the design of the cooperative mode. Shirley and Doug Trueman of GMR criticised Next Encounter's plot as "just filler, and not very good filler" and a "total throwaway", respectively. Trueman also disliked the humour and found that the delivery of Sam's one-line jokes fell flat. Conversely, Biessener noted that the humour fit "perfectly" into the style of the series, while David considered it "sly". Bickham deemed the game's music "incessant speed-metal nonsense", although Davis regarded the indication of incoming enemies as a good audio cue.
