= Serious Sam Advance =

2004 video game

- Developer: Climax London
- Publisher: Global Star Software
- Producer: Phil Merricks
- Designers: Derek Poon; James Glanville
- Programmer: Rob Brooks
- Artists: Matt Baxter; Steve Green; Jon Green; Lewis Mitchell; Kevin McMahon
- Composer: Matt Simmonds
- Series: Serious Sam
- Platform: Game Boy Advance
- Release: NA: 14 April 2004; EU: 30 April 2004
- Genre: First-person shooter
- Modes: Single-player, multiplayer

Serious Sam Advance (also marketed as Serious Sam) is a 2004 first-person shooter game developed by Climax London and published by Global Star Software for the Game Boy Advance. A spin-off in the Serious Sam series, the game has the player control Sam "Serious" Stone through confined levels—first in ancient Egypt, then in ancient Rome—defeating varying enemies using an assortment of weapons. Serious Sam Advance was developed by Climax London, a studio of former Crawfish Interactive developers, using ray casting technology. Global Star Software announced the game in January 2004 and released it in April. Serious Sam Advance received mixed reviews, with praise for its weapons, enemies, level design, and sound effects, conflicting opinions about its graphics, and criticism for its controls and frame rate issues.

== Gameplay ==
Sam fighting two Beheaded Kamikazes with a revolver

Serious Sam Advance is a first-person shooter. It contains twelve levels, each composed of enclosed rooms, often in the style of arenas. Some levels contain puzzle elements. The player, as Sam "Serious" Stone, can freely navigate each room, using the D-pad for forward and backward movement and the shoulder buttons for strafing. Enemies patrol in rooms and attack Sam on sight. Entering a room or passing a trigger causes further enemies to appear and attack. There are twenty types of enemies in total.

The player can attack using ten different weapons, including ranged weapons and a chainsaw for melee. They can aim using the D-pad and fire the weapons using the "A" button. Holding down the button causes the weapons to fire continuously. Aiming can be slowed down by holding the "B" button, while pressing the button once swaps the active weapon with another. Enemies at close range are automatically targeted. Ammunition can be collected through crates placed in levels.

Serious Sam Advance contains no measures to save progress and uses a password system to let the player access later levels after a restart. A leaderboard documents the player's high score, number of enemies encountered, and number of enemies killed, although that data is also not persisted. Up to four players can connect their Game Boy Advance systems using the Game Boy Advance Game Link Cable and compete in a deathmatch mode.

== Plot ==
Serious Sam Advance is non-canon. It begins by recounting how Sam "Serious" Stone returned from a time-travel mission to Abu Simbel in 2113. Scientists assessed the Time-Lock technology that Sam used to travel through time. Initially, they could only use it to send people to and from ancient Egypt but, in 2020, became able to control the time and place of travellers' destinations. Using this feature, agents were sent to various ancient civilisations to investigate whether Mental—the antagonist in the Serious Sam series—was trying to release his horde on them to alter the course of history. This programme was successful for two years until three agents failed to return, as did the rescue team sent after them. Sam, the only survivor from previous encounters with Mental's forces, was thus selected to travel to ancient Rome in 512 BCE.

Sam initially arrives in ancient Egypt at the Temple of Herkat and fights his way through enemies sent by Mental, crossing the desert and eventually encountering and defeating the Sirian Sphinx, one of Mental's more powerful minions. Sam enters a Time-Lock with the intent to return home, but Mental interferes and sends him to ancient Rome instead. He again defeats several waves of enemies and reaches Caesar's Palace. In it, Sam eliminates the Wolfinator, marking the end of Mental's attempt to rule over ancient Rome. Wishing to take a vacation on Maui, Sam enters a nearby Time-Lock to return home.

== Development and release ==
Serious Sam Advance was developed by Climax Group through Climax London, its handheld-focused studio composed of former developers from the defunct company Crawfish Interactive. The team employed a game engine utilising ray casting to simulate 3D computer graphics on the Game Boy Advance, a technique Crawfish Interactive had pioneered for the platform. Global Star Software, the budget-range publishing label of Take-Two Interactive, announced Serious Sam Advance for the Game Boy Advance in January 2004, alongside Serious Sam: Next Encounter for the GameCube and PlayStation 2. The company released both games in North America on 14 April 2004. A European release followed on 30 April.

== Reception ==
Reception

Aggregate score
Aggregator	Score
Metacritic	51/100

Review scores
Publication	Score
GameSpot	5.6/10
IGN	5/10
NGC Magazine	58/100
Pocket Games	4.0/10

Serious Sam Advance received "mixed or average reviews", according to the review aggregator website Metacritic, which calculated a weighted average rating of 51/100 based on nine critic reviews. Craig Harris of IGN and Frank Provo of GameSpot observed that the game often had a low frame rate, which Harris determined caused Serious Sam Advance to be overly difficult. Jes Bickham, writing in NGC Magazine, commented that, due to the frame rate issues, the game was "slow and jittery, and ultimately workmanlike and tedious".

Provo lauded Serious Sam Advance's weapons, range of enemies, and level design. He stated that the music was "forgettable", while the sound effects for weapons and monsters were in good synchronicity with the gameplay. Provo considered the graphics superior to other games on the Game Boy Advance, while Bob McTague (Pocket Games) described them as a "pixelated disaster".

Harris, Bickham, and McTague criticised the controls, with Harris and McTague feeling they were too imprecise. Provo believed the game was too short, caused by a scarcity of levels. McTague noted that Serious Sam Advance was faithful to the design of the original Serious Sam games, although Harris and Provo deemed the Game Boy Advance unfit for any first-person shooter.
