= Serious Sam =

Video game series

- The "Serious Bomb" logo since Serious Sam 4
- Genre: First-person shooter
- Developer: Croteam (Note: Croteam is the series' creator and primary developer. Other developers that worked on Serious Sam games are InterActive Vision, Climax London, Climax Solent, Mommy's Best Games, Be-Rad Entertainment, Vlambeer, Eric Ruth Games, Crackshell, Croteam VR, Binx Interactive, Timelock Studio, Gungrounds, and Behaviour Interactive.)
- Publishers: Gathering of Developers (2001–2002); Global Star Software (2001, 2004); Gotham Games (2002); 2K Games (2005); Devolver Digital (2009–present)
- Platforms: List: Android; iOS; GameCube; Game Boy Advance; Linux; macOS; Nintendo Switch; Palm OS; PlayStation 2; PlayStation 3; PlayStation 4; PlayStation 5; Stadia; Windows; Xbox; Xbox 360; Xbox One; Xbox Series X/S
- First release: Serious Sam: The First Encounter; 21 March 2001
- Latest release: Serious Sam: Shatterverse; 31 August 2026

Serious Sam is a video game series created and primarily developed by Croteam. It consists predominantly of first-person shooters. The series follows the advances of Sam "Serious" Stone against Mental, an extraterrestrial overlord who attempts to destroy humanity at various points in time. The first game, Serious Sam: The First Encounter, was released for Microsoft Windows in March 2001. Several spin-offs were developed by other developers, such as a Palm OS conversion of The First Encounter by InterActive Vision, Serious Sam: Next Encounter (on GameCube and PlayStation 2) by Climax Solent, and Serious Sam Advance (on Game Boy Advance) by Climax London. All three were published by Global Star Software.

== Development ==
Croteam created a proprietary engine for use in both Serious Sam: The First Encounter and Serious Sam: The Second Encounter. At the time Croteam was making Serious Sam, licensing other engines was costly (upwards of US$1 million), so they made their own from scratch, following the feature set of the first Doom engine, which simulated 3D spaces in 2D, and did not include up or down targeting. As they were creating their own, both Duke Nukem 3D (which added up-and-down freelook) and Quake (a fully 3D rendered environment) were released, requiring Croteam to incorporate these features into their engine for their game to be competitive. Development was further complicated when the first 3D accelerators were released, prompting Croteam to develop for hardware rendering over software. Recognizing they needed to bring something new to what other games were pushing at that time, Croteam decided that they would make their Serious Engine support extremely large environments, with virtual view distances of over a kilometre, physics support, and capability of rendering up to a hundred enemies on screen at a time, and do this on the processing power of what current low-end computers using the original Pentium CPUs could handle. The team devised ways of doing object path caching so that they only had to perform collision detection with environmental features every few seconds rather than every cycle. Collision detection was also sped up by approximating the environment with spheres rather than boxes. This also enabled them to have multidirection gravity which was used for some of the game's secret areas.

Serious Engine 1 is available as open-source software. A more powerful iteration of the Serious Engine was developed for use in Serious Sam II and is known as Serious Engine 2. It supports many features of modern GPUs such as pixel and vertex shaders, HDR, bloom and parallax mapping. Serious Engine 3 was used in Serious Sam HD: The First Encounter and Serious Sam HD: The Second Encounter. It includes detailed shading, and enemies are re-modelled to look more realistic. This engine is also being developed to harness the full capacity of HDR and high definition mapping. An updated version, Serious Engine 3.5, is used in Serious Sam 3.

Serious Sam is voiced by John Dick.

After the release of both HD remakes of the original Serious Sam episodes, Devolver Digital re-released both classic encounters in 2010 and Serious Sam II in 2011.

== Games ==
=== Main series ===
Year	Title	Platforms
2001	Serious Sam: The First Encounter	Linux, Nintendo Switch, Palm OS, PlayStation 4, Stadia, Windows, Xbox, Xbox 360, Xbox One
2002	Serious Sam: The Second Encounter	Linux, Nintendo Switch, PlayStation 4, Stadia, Windows, Xbox, Xbox 360, Xbox One
2005	Serious Sam II	Windows, Xbox
2011	Serious Sam 3: BFE	Linux, macOS, Nintendo Switch, PlayStation 3, PlayStation 4, Stadia, Windows, Xbox 360, Xbox One
2020	Serious Sam 4	PlayStation 5, Stadia, Windows, Xbox Series X/S
2022	Serious Sam: Siberian Mayhem	PlayStation 5, Stadia, Windows, Xbox Series X/S
TBA	Serious Sam: The Third Encounter	Windows

=== Spin-offs ===
Year	Title	Platforms
2004	Serious Sam: Next Encounter	GameCube, PlayStation 2
2004	Serious Sam Advance	Game Boy Advance
2011	Serious Sam Double D	Windows, Xbox 360
2011	Serious Sam: Kamikaze Attack!	Android, iOS, Windows
2011	Serious Sam: The Random Encounter	Windows
2012	Serious Sam: The Greek Encounter	Windows
2017	Serious Sam's Bogus Detour	Linux, Windows
2017	Serious Sam VR: The Last Hope	Windows
2018	I Hate Running Backwards	Linux, Nintendo Switch, PlayStation 4, Windows, Xbox One
2022	Serious Sam: Tormental	Windows
2026	Serious Sam: Shatterverse	PlayStation 5, Windows, Xbox Series X/S
