= Cardiaxx =

1991 video game

- Developer: Eclipse Design
- Publisher: Electronic Zoo
- Platform: Amiga
- Release: 1991
- Genre: Scrolling shooter

Cardiaxx is a science-fiction scrolling shooter video game for the Amiga. It was developed by Eclipse Design and published by Electronic Zoo in 1991, although it was originally published by Electronic Zoo. The game features a spaceship as it flies through various levels of varying graphic styles. Each level has a boss at the end, and each level is separated by a sub-level of avoiding asteroids while the next level loads from the floppy disk.

== Development ==
Cardiaxx was developed by David Mariner and Jon Mitchell of Eclipse Design, with Josef Karthauser later joining them. The game's original publisher, Electronic Zoo, failed to release funds owed to Eclipse Design for its development shortly after its public release in 1991. As a result, the Atari ST version was never released, and legal action followed. However, Electronic Zoo closed down during the legal proceedings. The game was later released by Team17, but again no funds beyond the initial signing fee were ever released. Therefore, Mariner and Mitchell still retain all rights to Cardiaxx to this day.

== Reception ==
Reception

Review scores
Publication	Score
Amiga Action	76%
Computer and Video Games	85/100
Pelit	68/100

Cardiaxx received generally positive reception from video game critics.
