= Serious Sam 3: BFE =

2011 video game

- Developer: Croteam
- Publisher: Devolver Digital
- Directors: Davor Hunski; Alen Ladavac
- Designers: Davor Hunski; Alen Ladavac; Davor Tomičić
- Programmer: Alen Ladavac
- Artist: Davor Hunski
- Writer: Alen Ladavac
- Composer: Damjan Mravunac
- Series: Serious Sam
- Engine: Serious Engine 3.5
- Platforms: Windows; Linux; Mac OS X; Xbox 360; Xbox One; PlayStation 3; PlayStation 4; Nintendo Switch; Stadia
- Release: Windows; 22 November 2011; Mac OS X; 23 April 2012; Xbox 360; 17 October 2012; Linux; 20 December 2012; PlayStation 3; 13 May 2014; Windows, Linux (VR); 9 November 2017; Stadia; 3 March 2020; Nintendo Switch, Xbox One, PlayStation 4; 17 November 2020
- Genre: First-person shooter
- Modes: Single-player, multiplayer

Serious Sam 3: BFE is a 2011 first-person shooter video game developed by Croatia-based indie development studio Croteam and published by Devolver Digital. It is part of the Serious Sam series and the prequel to the 2001 video game, Serious Sam: The First Encounter. The game takes place in 22nd-century Egypt, during Mental's invasion of Earth, as implied in The First Encounter. The game features a 16-player online, as well as a 4-player splitscreen co-op campaign mode.

The game was first released for Microsoft Windows on 22 November 2011. The OS X support for the game followed shortly after and was released on 23 April 2012. The Linux version of the game started being worked on after a high number of requests, where the first Linux-related update was the porting of the game's dedicated server. The game itself, however, was released on the day Valve opened the beta branch for "Steam for Linux", namely on 6 November 2012.

== Gameplay ==
Like previous titles in the series, Serious Sam 3: BFE involves fighting against many hordes of enemies in wide-open environments. However, Serious Sam 3 has more closed environments than its predecessors, particularly in the early levels. There are also a larger number of enemies that can attack the player from a distance.

There are 13 weapons in total, five of which have a manual reload. The signature close-combat weapons from the first game, the knife and chainsaw, have been replaced with a sledgehammer with three modes of attack.

In the style of old-fashioned first-person shooters, there is no regenerating health, instead, there are health and armor power-ups scattered throughout the levels that the player must pick up. Additionally, the levels are full of secret areas, where health, armor, ammo, and in some cases, weapons from later levels can be found, following the tradition of the previous games. Some weapons such as the Lasergun and the Sniper Rifle and their respective ammunition pickups are secret-only and otherwise are not found in the levels normally. There are no puzzles, however, the player must find keys, pull levers, and find environmental anomalies to progress.

Classic enemies such as the Beheaded Kamikaze, Beheaded Rocketeer and Kleer Skeleton return in the game. New ones include the Khnum and Scrapjack (resembling the Hell Knight and Mancubus from Doom, respectively), as well as the cloned soldiers reminiscent of the Strogg from the Quake series. The Kamikaze has returned to his original design, rather than the Serious Sam II design. The Gnaar's design has radically changed from the original game. It is now much larger, differently shaped, and walks on all fours, unlike its bipedal counterpart in the original.

Serious Sam 3 features some new gameplay mechanics such as sprinting and iron sights. Unlike most other FPS games that have sprinting, the player is able to sprint as much as they want, but they cannot attack while sprinting. The pistol and assault rifle have the ability to aim down sights, which increases accuracy but only slightly. The player moves slower while aiming down the sights, making it impractical at close range. The player can perform hand kills or kick enemies to conserve ammo, depending on the weapon selected. For example, a Gnaar's eyeball can be ripped out or an Antaresian Spider's shell can be broken.

== Plot ==
Serious Sam 3: BFE serves as a prequel to Serious Sam: The First Encounter and depicts the events on Earth before Sam's journey into the past. Prior to AD 2060, humanity had slowly begun uncovering artifacts and ruins left behind in ancient times by the Sirians, the famous and long-thought extinct race from the planet Sirius. Unfortunately, Mental has chosen this time to turn his attention upon Earth. He dispatches his space fleet carrying his endless hordes to attack Earth, leading a three-year conquest that has humanity driven almost to the point of extinction. In a last-ditch effort, the survivors turn to the Time-Lock, a recently excavated device supposedly capable of granting a single person the ability of time travel via an inter-dimensional portal. Through it, that person could reach a pivotal point in time and alter events of the past. But as the device lies dormant, they must first discover a means to turn it on.

Sam "Serious" Stone, part of the Earth Defense Force, is dispatched with a detachment of soldiers in Alpha team to modern Egypt, which is occupied by Mental's alien army. Their original mission is to recon, rendezvous and extract Bravo team who are protecting Dr Stein, a scientist carrying hieroglyphics believed to contain instructions for powering up the Time-Lock. Sam's insertion goes haywire as his chopper is shot down and both teams are quickly wiped out. However, he is able to recover the hieroglyphics from Stein's phone in the museum and transmit them to headquarters. Deciphering indicates there is a hidden Sirian chamber below the Great Pyramid. Sam clears himself a path to a tunnel underneath the Sphinx and descends into the Pyramid. He not only discovers the hidden chamber, but recovers crucial information and a bracelet device from the remains of what might have been Earth's last Sirian.

In order to power the Time-Lock, two dormant but incredibly powerful plasma-energy generators need to be activated in Karnak and Luxor. Hellfire from Charlie team inserts Sam to bring both online. This is slowly accomplished and Team Charlie is staged to enter the Time-Lock. Sam is relieved of duty and in the process of being extracted from Luxor, but is shot down once again and is forced to flee towards the lost ruins of Nubia. Traversing through more tombs, Sam gets back in touch with Hellfire and learns that Mental's forces have overrun the human military and killed them all shortly before dying herself. Now determined to finish what the Sirians had started, Sam vows to use the Time-Lock himself and kill Mental in the past before he can destroy humanity in the present. Sam then makes one last travel to Hatshepsut Temple, where the Time-Lock is located. The struggle to this destination ends with Sam killing Ugh-Zan IV, the father of Ugh-Zan III from Serious Sam: The First Encounter. With Ugh-Zan IV dead, the Time-Lock then activates, displaying an inter-dimensional portal to 3000 B.C., the timeline where the Sirians became extinct. Sam calls Mental on Stein's phone and is answered by Mental's daughter, Judy. She tells him that Mental is planning to "moon" him. Sam notices the Moon plummeting rapidly within Earth's atmosphere and escapes through the Time-Lock to 3000 B.C. as the Moon impacts Earth, destroying the planet.

== Development ==
The game features Steamworks DRM and a complex system of custom checks as part of its copy protection system. If the game code detects what it believes to be an unauthorised copy, it alters gameplay to make play exceedingly difficult. An invincible arachnoid is spawned: this creature can charge at high speed, melee attack, and attacks from a range with twin chainguns.

=== Downloadable content ===
A downloadable content pack titled Jewel of the Nile was released for the Windows and Mac versions of the game on 16 October 2012. The DLC contains a new single-player campaign and competitive game modes for the game's multiplayer mode. New achievements are also included. Jewel of the Nile was released for Xbox 360 on 17 October 2012, together with the game itself.

=== VR remake ===
A virtual reality remake of the game titled Serious Sam 3 VR: BFE was released on 9 November 2017 for Windows and Linux.

== Reception ==
Reception

Aggregate score
Aggregator	Score
Metacritic	PC: 72/100; X360: 63/100

Review scores
Publication	Score
Destructoid	8.5/10
Eurogamer	7/10
Game Informer	7.75/10
GameSpot	6/10
IGN	7/10

Serious Sam 3: BFE received "mixed or average" reviews. Eurogamer gave the game a 7 out of 10, praising it for what Duke Nukem Forever failed to deliver, however criticizing the redundancy of the title's gameplay compared to its previous iterations in the series. Game Informer rewarded the game a score of 7.75 and praised the game for its graphics and the heavy metal score while being true to its original concept. Destructoid gave it an 8.5, saying "It's a lot of fun indeed. A lot of backbreaking, grueling, soul-destroying fun." Review aggregation website Metacritic gave the game a score of 72 out of 100 based on 53 reviews.
