= Croteam =

Croatian video game developer

- Trade name: Croteam
- Type: Subsidiary
- Industry: Video games
- Founded: August 1992; 34 years ago
- Founders: Davor Hunski; Damir Perović; Roman Ribarić; Dean Sekulić
- Headquarters: Zagreb, Croatia
- Key people: Roman Ribarić (CEO); Davor Hunski (CCO); Damjan Mravunac (CMO)
- Products: Serious Sam; The Talos Principle
- Number of employees: 42 (2022)
- Parent: Devolver Digital (2020–present)
- Divisions: Croteam Incubator; Croteam VR
- Website: croteam.com

Croteam is a Croatian video game developer based in Zagreb. The company was established by Davor Hunski, Damir Perović, Roman Ribarić and Dean Sekulić, four former classmates, in late August 1992. Croteam is best known for Serious Sam, a series of first-person shooters introduced with Serious Sam: The First Encounter in 2001. The company also developed the 2014 puzzle game The Talos Principle and its 2023 sequel The Talos Principle 2. Croteam employed approximately 40 people in 2020 and was acquired by its long-time publishing partner Devolver Digital in October 2020. The company is currently an entity of ABEST d.o.o.

== History ==
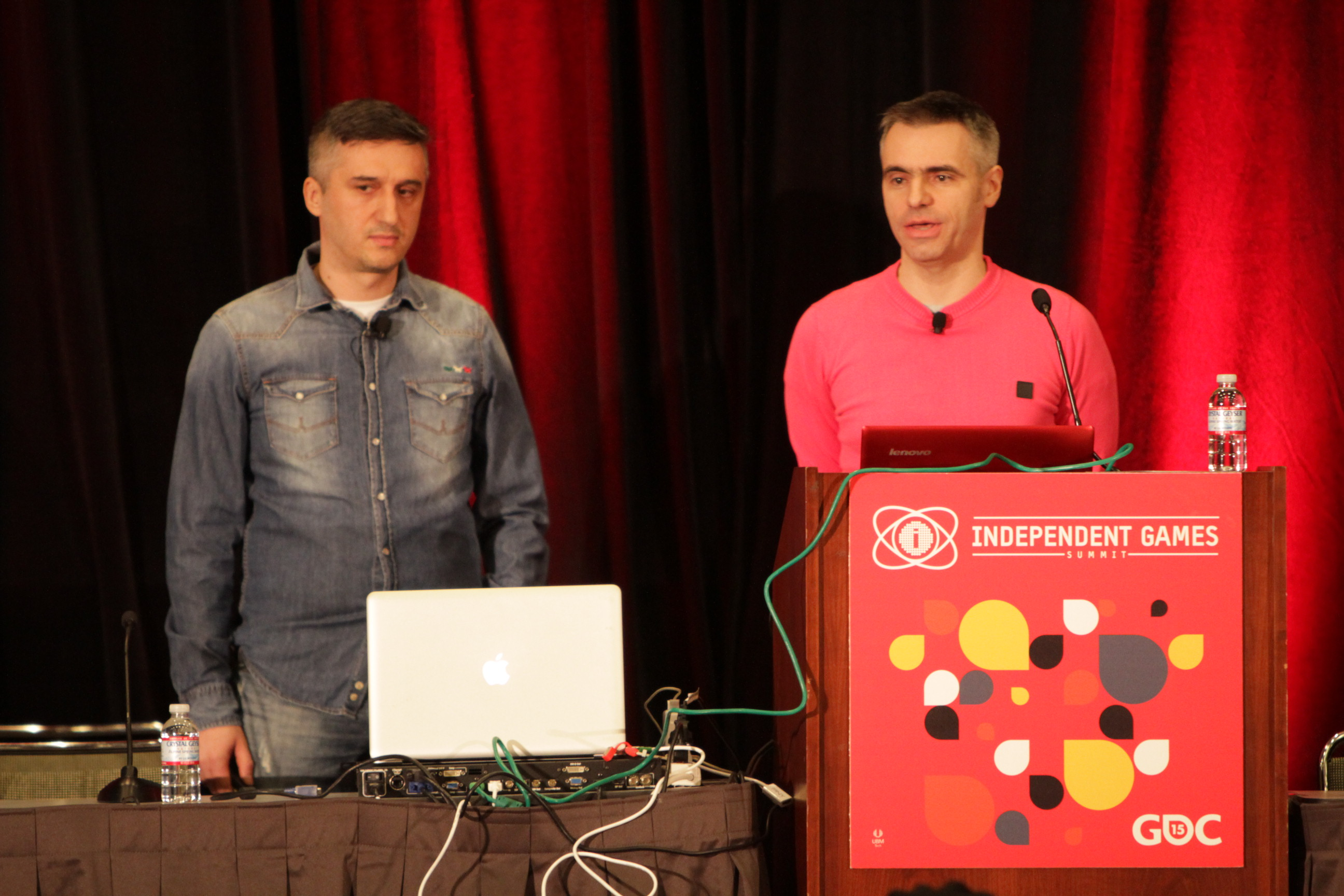
Chief creative officer Davor Hunski (left) and chief technology officer Alen Ladavac at the 2015 Game Developers Conference

Croteam was founded by Davor Hunski, Damir Perović, Roman Ribarić, and Dean Sekulić. Hunski and Ribarić were born and raised in the Utrina neighbourhood of Zagreb and initially met around age 6 at the "Mladost" primary school, which they attended for eight years. Perović and Sekulić came from the neighbouring Sloboština and Sopot, respectively. All four were in Neli Mindoljević's class during their four-year tenure at the "Nikola Tesla" high school in Zagreb, graduating as part of the school's last generation in 1991. The brother of another classmate was the first Croat to release a commercial video game. After Hunski and Ribarić learned that the developer made a profit with his endeavour, they decided to develop games for a living. In late August 1992, while studying at separate universities, Hunski and Ribarić teamed up with Perović and Sekulić to found Croteam. Personal computers, such as the Amiga, were expensive at the time, wherefore the team acquired hardware from grey market, duty-free shops. The company initially operated out of Ribarić's apartment in Utrina and later rented an office in the building where Hunski resided with his mother. Both rent and hardware were financed by the parents of various employees. Other team members, such as Sekulić, worked from home and shared source code with the others by exchanging floppy disks. Several Croteam employees, including Hunski, were drafted for one-year military conscriptions. Croteam later rented office space from the Brodarski institut.

Croteam's first game was a clone of Sokoban, created to demonstrate that the team could successfully complete a game. Having finished that project, the team decided to create an association football game, which later became a clone of Sensible Soccer. The game, Football Glory, entered production in late 1993 and was completed in October 1994. During this time, the Croteam staff was expanded with Admir Elezović, Alen Ladavac, Tomislav Pongrac, and Marko Sekulić. The game was released on 6 November 1994 for the 500, 1200 and 4000 models of the Amiga. The company subsequently created an MS-DOS version of the game, which was released in May 1995. Sensible Software, the developer of Sensible Soccer, soon threatened with legal action, wherefore Croteam ceased all development on Football Glory. An indoor soccer version of Football Glory, titled Five-A-Side Soccer, was completed in 1995 and designed for the Amiga 500, 1200, and 4000 systems. It was due to be published by Black Legend as Football Glory Indoors but the company was shut down in 1996 due to a declining Amiga games market. The German office was unsuccessful in selling the finished game to distributors like Schatzkiste before entering insolvency in July 1996. Croteam released Five-A-Side Soccer as public-domain software in March 2000.

Also in 1995, the studio began work on Save the Earth, a game created for Turbo Limach Show, a Croatian children's game show by the Croatian national broadcaster, Hrvatska radiotelevizija. The game was designed for the Amiga 4000 with additional hardware. The development wrapped up in January 1996 and the game was shown on Turbo Limach Show every week between March and July 1996. In mid-1996, Croteam decided that its next game would a 3D first-person shooter game with a dark, horror-themed atmosphere. The company announced the game Flesh in September that year. Davor Tomičić, another former classmate of the four founders, joined Croteam in late 1997. In 1998, the theme of the game, which was now known as In the Flesh, was changed to a more bright and open environment, followed by a name change to Serious Sam the year after, upon insistence from Ribarić. Damjan Mravunac was hired in 1999 as Croteam's composer and sound effects designer, taking over the latter occupation from Ribarić. He was followed shortly by Dinko Pavičić and Petar Ivanček, completing the development team for Serious Sam.

Serious Sam was released as Serious Sam: The First Encounter by Gathering of Developers in 2001, followed by Serious Sam: The Second Encounter in 2002. Both Serious Sam games debuted on Microsoft Windows and utilised Croteam's in-house Serious Engine. In 2002, Serious Sam for the Xbox was released, which consisted of both games with the additional number of cinematics, an updated scores system, combos, multikills, auto-aiming and other console specific features. A sequel, Serious Sam II for both PC and Xbox was released on 11 October 2005, using Serious Engine 2.

In 2007, development began on Serious Sam 3: BFE, a prequel to the original game. In 2010, Croteam released high definition remakes of the original Serious Sam games with upgraded textures and models, enhanced engine, user interface and audio, and additional features. Serious Sam 3: BFE was released for Windows in November 2011, soon followed by macOS and Linux versions. The Xbox 360 version of Serious Sam 3: BFE was released on Xbox Live Arcade in September 2012, and later made its way to PlayStation 3 via PlayStation Network in March 2014. In December 2014, Croteam released the first-person puzzle game The Talos Principle for Microsoft Windows, macOS, and Linux.

Ladavac left Croteam to join Google's Munich-based branch in October 2019 and work on the Stadia project. By the time of Serious Sam 4's late development in 2020, Croteam employed around 40 employees. On 16 October 2020, Devolver Digital acquired Croteam from Ribarić, Sekulić, Elezović, Hunski, and Tomičić. At the time, the company comprised five legal entities—Abest d.o.o., Des informatika 2010 d.o.o., Nebo iz sna d.o.o., Nebo media d.o.o, and Plavi slon d.o.o.—which each held portions of Croteam's intellectual property. They were consolidated by merging the latter four into Abest d.o.o. on 1 April 2021, leaving the latter as the sole entity for Croteam.

== Croteam Incubator ==
In 2015, Croteam launched Croteam Indie, a division to support small indie game development teams based in Croatia with investments and co-production. Croteam's first such co-production was Scum by Gamepires, for which a contract was signed in December 2015. The division was later expanded into a business incubator programme providing teams with office space and technology, as well as occasionally financial support. In March 2018, it was formally announced as Croteam Incubator, at the time with six studios based in the same Zagreb office as part of the programme. Among the first games released under the Croteam Incubator banner were I Hate Running Backwards, Tormental, and Battle Bolts. Ribarić acts as the division's president, Nikola Mosettig as vice-president, Damjan Mravunac as chief operating officer, and Zeno Žokalj as marketing and public relations manager.

== Serious Engine ==
For development of Serious Sam: The First Encounter, Croteam developed the Serious Engine (formerly named S-Cape3D), a proprietary game engine, which, while similar to other engines at the time, was designed to render large environments and support a large number of enemies visible at any time. Serious Engine 2 was developed alongside Serious Sam II, adding in support for a physics engine, refraction, detailed textures, and high dynamic range lighting.

Serious Engine 3 was used to support the high-definition remakes of The First Encounter and The Second Encounter for release on Windows and Xbox 360, adding in true high-dynamic lighting support. As Croteam wanted to target more platforms with the release of Serious Sam 3: BFE, Serious Engine 3 was heavily reworked to support seventh-generation consoles, and became Serious Engine 3.5. With the introduction of eighth-generation consoles, Croteam continued to improve the Serious Engine, releasing it as Serious Engine 4, which premiered with The Talos Principle. Serious Engine was also used in Serious Sam 4.

In celebration of Serious Sam: The First Encounter's 15th anniversary in March 2016, Croteam released the source code for the final version of the first iteration of Serious Engine, version 1.10, under the GNU GPL-2-0-only. For The Talos Principle 2, Croteam replaced Serious Engine with Unreal Engine 4, ultimately switching to Unreal Engine 5. The company's lead programmer Goran Adrinek described this in October 2023 as a "permanent transition" away from Serious Engine, which he said could not quickly be expanded with the features of Unreal Engine 5.

== Games developed ==
Year	Title	Platform(s)	Publisher(s)
1994	Football Glory	Amiga, MS-DOS	Black Legend
1996	Save the Earth	Amiga	—N/a
2000	Five-A-Side Soccer	Amiga	Croteam
2001	Serious Sam: The First Encounter	Windows, Xbox	Gathering of Developers, Gotham Games
2002	Serious Sam: The Second Encounter	Windows, Xbox	Gathering of Developers, Gotham Games
2005	Serious Sam II	Windows, Xbox	2K Games
2009	Serious Sam HD: The First Encounter	Nintendo Switch, PlayStation 4, Stadia, Windows, Xbox 360, Xbox One	Devolver Digital
2010	Serious Sam HD: The Second Encounter	Nintendo Switch, PlayStation 4, Stadia, Windows, Xbox 360, Xbox One	Devolver Digital
2011	Serious Sam 3: BFE	Linux, macOS, Nintendo Switch, PlayStation 3, PlayStation 4, Stadia, Windows, Xbox 360, Xbox One	Devolver Digital
2014	Sigils of Elohim	Android, iOS, Linux, macOS, Windows	Devolver Digital
2014	The Talos Principle	Android, iOS, Linux, macOS, Nintendo Switch, PlayStation 4, Stadia, Windows, Xbox One	Devolver Digital
2017	Serious Sam VR: The First Encounter	Linux, Windows	Devolver Digital
2017	Serious Sam VR: The Second Encounter	Linux, Windows	Devolver Digital
2017	Serious Sam VR: The Last Hope	Windows	Devolver Digital
2017	The Talos Principle VR	Linux, Windows	Devolver Digital
2017	Serious Sam 3 VR: BFE	Linux, Windows	Devolver Digital
2020	Serious Sam 4	Stadia, Windows, Xbox Series X/S, PlayStation 5	Devolver Digital
2023	The Talos Principle 2	PlayStation 5, Windows, Xbox Series X/S	Devolver Digital
2025	The Talos Principle: Reawakened	PlayStation 5, Windows, Xbox Series X/S	Devolver Digital
2027	The Talos Principle 3	PlayStation 5, Windows	Devolver Digital
TBA	Serious Sam: The Third Encounter	Windows	Devolver Digital

== Games co-produced ==
Year	Title	Platform(s)	Developer(s)	Ref.
Cancelled	Evil's Doom	Amiga	Olympia Software	
1994	Embryo	Amiga	Beyond Arts	
1995	Inordinate Desire	MS-DOS	Virtual Arts	
2018	I Hate Running Backwards	Linux, Nintendo Switch, PlayStation 4, Windows, Xbox One	Binx Interactive	
2019	Battle Bolts	Windows	Shot Second	
2019	Unity of Command II	Windows	2x2 Games	
2020	The Hand of Merlin	Windows	Room-C Games	
2022	Serious Sam: Siberian Mayhem	PlayStation 5, Windows, Xbox Series X/S	Timelock Studio	
2022	Serious Sam: Tormental	Windows	Gungrounds	
2025	Scum	Windows	Gamepires	
