= Devolver Digital =

American video game publisher and film distributor

Devolver Digital, Inc.
- Type: Private
- Traded as: AIM: DEVO (2021-2026)
- ISIN: USU0858L1036
- Industry: Video games
- Founded: June 25, 2009; 17 years ago
- Founders: Nigel Lowrie; Harry Miller; Graeme Struthers; Rick Stults; Mike Wilson
- Headquarters: Austin, Texas, US
- Area served: Worldwide
- Key people: Harry Miller (CEO); Daniel Widdicombe (CFO)
- Owners: Harry Miller (22.17%); NetEase (7.97%); Graeme Struthers (6.8%); Nigel Lowrie (6.21%); Sony Interactive Entertainment (5%); Kwalee (3.58%); (as of 6 July 2024)
- Number of employees: 276 (2024)
- Subsidiaries: Big Fan Games; Croteam; Dodge Roll; Doinksoft; Firefly Studios; Good Shepherd Entertainment; Nerial; System Era Softworks
- Website: devolverdigital.com

Devolver Digital, Inc. is an American video game publisher based in Austin, Texas, specializing in the publishing of indie games. The company was founded in June 2009 by Nigel Lowrie, Harry Miller, Graeme Struthers, Rick Stults, and Mike Wilson, five executives who had been involved with Gathering of Developers and Gamecock Media Group, which published games on developer-friendly terms, but due to the high cost associated with releasing retail games saw themselves acquired and dissolved by larger companies. To avoid this, Devolver Digital instead turned to digital distribution platforms.

Devolver Digital started by publishing high-definition remakes of games in the Serious Sam series. After success with these remakes and spin-off games based on the series, Devolver Digital began publishing games from other, smaller independent studios, one of the first being its breakout title, Hotline Miami. The company also operated Devolver Digital Films for film distribution, and majority-owns publisher Good Shepherd Entertainment. As of December 2024, Devolver Digital employs 276 people. The company went public on the Alternative Investment Market (AIM) in November 2021. The company went private once again and delisted from the AIM in September 2026 after 90% of its shareholders voted in favor of privatization. The company is primarily owned by Miller, Struthers and Lowrie themselves, with minority stakes by NetEase, Sony Interactive Entertainment and Kwalee.

== History ==
=== Founding and initial development (2009–2012) ===
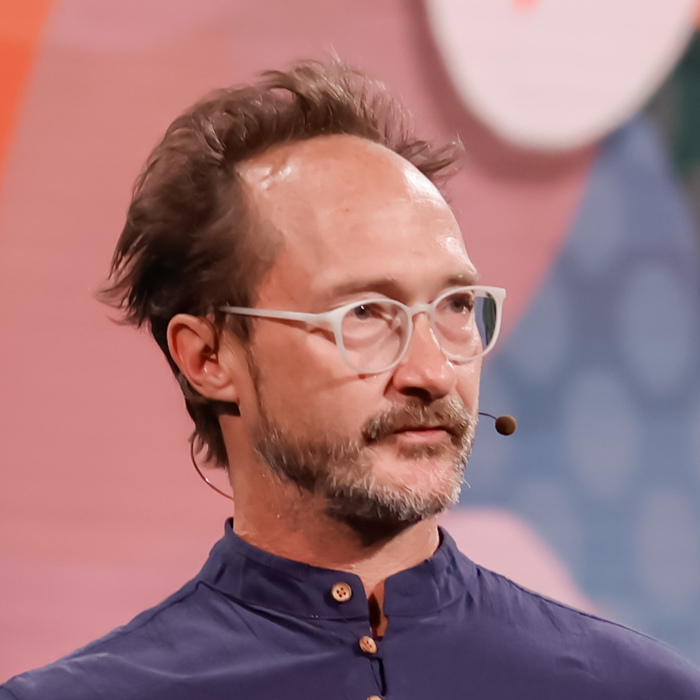
Wilson (pictured in 2022) co-founded Devolver Digital in 2009 and led it until 2017.

Devolver Digital was founded in Austin, Texas, by Harry Miller, Rick Stults, and Mike Wilson. The three had previously co-founded publishing companies Gathering of Developers in 1998, and Gamecock Media Group in 2007. With both Gathering of Developers and Gamecock Media Group, the co-founders had envisioned a publishing model wherein the publisher would handle all logistical aspects of releasing a game, so that the developer could focus on developing the game itself. This included offering deals wherein the developers could keep all rights to their games. However, at the time of these companies' existences, the primary distribution channel for games was retail, which was very costly. As a result, both companies saw themselves acquired by larger companies at some point, and were dissolved shortly thereafter. Devolver Digital thus aimed at not producing games in physical forms, and instead focusing publishing efforts for digital distribution platforms, such as Steam.

Devolver Digital started with six people, including the three founders, as well as founding partners Nigel Lowrie and Graeme Struthers, business partners from Gamecock. The company's establishment was announced on June 25, 2009. As the company did not occupy any office, its mailing address was that of a bird feed shop owned by Stults until 2018. Their first game, announced alongside their formation, was Serious Sam HD: The First Encounter, a high-definition remake of the 2001 game Serious Sam: The First Encounter, both developed by Croteam. The original Serious Sam games were published by Gathering of Developers, and Croteam had continued working with Wilson and his partners while at Gamecock Media Group. Since Croteam's deal with Gathering of Developers allowed Croteam to retain the rights to the series, they were able to work with Devolver Digital on further titles beyond the ownership of Gathering of Developers' assets. The partnership proved fruitful, and Croteam and Devolver Digital continued to co-operate for a high-definition remake of the second Serious Sam game, Serious Sam: The Second Encounter. To avoid having to bring in investors or otherwise raise funding, Devolver Digital at first avoided signing titles other than Serious Sam. The company then opted to work with smaller independent studios, such as the two-man team Vlambeer, to produce indie games based on Serious Sam. Between 2011 and 2012, these partnerships produced four spin-off games based on Serious Sam, known as the Serious Sam Indie Series.

Following its success with the Serious Sam Indie Series, Devolver Digital became more open to other independent studios. The company signed a few new games, but also had to reject many offers due to a lack of capacities. One of the games they signed was Hotline Miami by the two-man studio Dennaton Games. The game, released in 2012, became Devolver Digital's breakout hit; it received critical praise, appeared on multiple "Best of 2012" lists, and sold over 1,700,000 copies by February 2013.

=== Growth and film distribution (2013–present) ===
In March 2013, at the SXSW Film Festival, Devolver Digital announced Devolver Digital Films, a film distribution subsidiary. The partnership would be led by Devolver Digital's Wilson, alongside Andie Grace, who became vice-president of acquisitions. In the films business, Wilson had previously produced the film Austin High, while Grace had held oversight roles for film projects created at the Burning Man Festival. Devolver Digital cited the lack of support for independent filmmakers at the point of distribution and financial support in production as primary reason for the opening.

Devolver continued to expand its publishing catalog from 2013, publishing roughly ten games per year. They have typically focused on smaller indie developers, and while they are often associated with weird and bizarre games, such as Genital Jousting, this is only by happenstance, according to Wilson. Wilson withdrew from active involvement in Devolver Digital in 2017. Throughout 2020, he sold much of his stock back to the publisher and to NetEase. Wilson went on to found another publisher, DeepWell Digital Therapeutics, alongside Nextern founder Ryan Douglas in March 2022.

In August 2020, Devolver Digital published Mediatonic's Fall Guys. The game was commercially successful, generating $150.5 million by the end of 2020. In March 2021, Epic Games acquired Mediatonic, as part of which Devolver Digital sold all its publishing rights of certain Mediatonic games, including Fall Guys. Devolver Digital used the proceeds from the game and the rights sale for expansion, including mergers and acquisitions.

The first such acquisition was Croteam in October 2020. At the time, the company comprised several legal entities, which were consolidated into one entity in February 2021. Devolver Digital then acquired publisher Good Shepherd Entertainment, which had previously been majority-owned by Devolver Digital's executives, in January 2021. Subsequently, the company bought developer Nerial (the developer of the Reigns series) in April, Firefly Studios (Stronghold series) in June, and Dodge Roll (Enter the Gungeon) in July 2021.

Furthermore, the company hired Daniel Widdicombe as chief financial officer in May 2021 and in the same year promoted Douglas Morin, who had joined the company as chief of staff in 2020, to chief executive officer. After indicating around May 2021 that it was looking to have an initial public offering, Devolver became a public company on November 4, 2021, trading its stock under the ticker symbol DEVO on the Alternative Investment Market (AIM), a submarket of the London Stock Exchange, initially valued at £694.6 million ($950 million). At the time, that made Devolver Digital the largest American company to trade on the London Stock Exchange, and the second-largest company in value on AIM. Sony Interactive Entertainment acquired a 5% stake in Devolver Digital in the meantime.

In April 2023, Devolver acquired Oregon-based indie studio Doinksoft. In November of the same year, Devolver acquired Washington-based indie studio System Era Softworks, known for Astroneer, whom Devolver had attempted to acquire the publishing rights to years ago but failed. Morin stepped down as CEO in February 2024 and was replaced by Miller.

In July 2024, Kwalee acquired a 3.58% minority stake in Devolver Digital for the purpose of expanding its operations in the PC and console market.

Devolver launched a new publishing branch, Big Fan Games, in October 2024. Big Fan aimed to cater to indie developers that were working with licensed intellectual properties to develop their games. The branch includes members from Good Shepherd Entertainment, taking over the publishing rights of its previous games John Wick Hex and Hellboy Web of Wyrd, while several partnerships have been established with large IP holders including The Walt Disney Company, Home Box Office, Inc., and Dark Horse Comics.

Devolver informed shareholders it intended to delist from the AIM market and become private ahead of a September 2026 shareholders' meeting, seeking a vote to affirm this step. The company told shareholders that it "faced the ongoing challenge of delivering growth in line with market expectations despite those difficult sector conditions", and that its current share price "does not reflect the true market value" of the company, having lost about 96% of its share value since it was first listed. At the meeting, which occurred on September 8, 90% of shareholders voted in favor of going private. On September 16, the company officially delisted from the AIM.

=== Fork Parker ===
Devolver Digital presents Fork Parker, a fictional character, as its chief financial officer. The character first appeared in a promotional video for Serious Sam HD: The First Encounter in August 2009. A Twitter account is operated under Fork Parker's name, which, as of September 2015, has 10,000 followers. He is also credited on Devolver Digital's blog posts and press releases. Fork Parker is intentionally presented as satirical and inappropriate. A game featuring the character, Fork Parker's Holiday Profit Hike was released for free on Windows and OS X in 2014; it was developed by Dodge Roll as their debut game, two years before the release of Enter the Gungeon. Another game, Fork Parker's Crunch Out was developed by Mega Cat Studios for the Super Nintendo Entertainment System and released by Devolver Digital in February 2019, with all profits going to Take This, a non-profit organization for mental health in the gaming community.

=== Big Fancy Press Conferences ===
Devolver Digital announced in May 2017 that it was to hold a press conference at the E3 2017 exhibition event. The conference deviated from common practice, as it was a pre-recorded satirical video, entitled the Big Fancy Press Conference, of a supposed live show, hosted by Devolver Digital's supposed chief synergy officer Nina Struthers, played by actress Mahria Zook. It included several mock announcements, such as that of a new microtransaction method where the customer could throw money at the screen to purchase items, and that of "Earliest Access", a parody on early access in which players could pre-order games that had yet to enter production. The video was directed by Don Thacker, the head of film production company Imagos Films.

Another Big Fancy Press Conference was held at E3 2018, with Zook reprising her role. This show introduced on a new item called the "Lootboxcoin", a parody of both cryptocurrency and loot boxes, which was a plastic coin that had no actual value, but was made available for purchase from Devolver Digital's online store for a fluctuating price. The presentation explicitly stated that the coin was not a cryptocurrency, should not be considered currency and warned viewers that they could not buy anything with it.

Devolver Digital held another Big Fancy Press Conference at E3 2019, revealing a direct-to-consumer "Devolver Direct" video (its name and format being a parody of Nintendo Direct). The show contained several announcements for actual games, including Devolver Bootleg, a collection of games parodying other games published by Devolver Digital. The game was released alongside the announcement, at a 1% discount. The music for the three conferences was composed by John Robert Matz; a compilation album, titled Devolver Digital Cinematic Universe: Phase 1 (Original Soundtrack), was released through label Materia Collective in June 2019.

A second "Devolver Direct" was held on July 12, 2020. Alongside several game announcements (Both real and fake), Mock interviews with game characters and prominent industry figures, the Direct had frequent cutaways to the ongoing storyline established in past Devolver Directs: As characters try to save Nina who has been enslaved and transformed into a "Trans-interlocal Broadcast Conduit" from which she hosts the Directs against her will. The show culminates with the announcement of Devolverland Expo Simulator, a first person "Marketing Simulator" designed to replace the then cancelled E3 expo of that year.

During the E3 2021 Digital expo, Devolver held another Livestream. Stepping back from the ongoing storyline, this stream instead focused on the employees of Devolver themselves as they announced the satirical "Devolver MaxPass+" Subscription service. A free "Monetization as a Service" that gave consumers access to purchase its games. Designed to poke fun at the rise of subscription services such as Xbox Game Pass that year, the service did not provide any tangible benefit to users and couldn't actually be purchased.

For the 2022 Summer Game Fest, Devolver hosted the "Devolver Digital Marketing Countdown to Marketing", hosted by "MechaSuda" (A Max Headroom style video of Goichi Suda played on a screen inside a mechanical robot suit). The stream begins with almost a full minute of Suda just slowly counting down in seconds, until he is interrupted by Nina. Five game trailers are then shown in total, while the characters panic about an impending "Video Game Singularity": Caused by the repeated mergers of various large-scale videogame companies over the course of the last year. The stream ends with MechaSuda making a wish on a Lootboxcoin, rewinding time back to the start of the conference, then self destructing.

At the 2023 Summer Game Fest, Devolver Digital presented a showcase titled "Devolver Direct: The Return of Volvy," with creative direction by Joe Pelling, renowned for his creation of "Don't Hug Me I'm Scared". Pelling took on the roles of writer and director for this 20-minute event, which was produced by Blink Ink. The showcase distinguished itself by combining mockumentary-style footage with the narrative of a live event, ultimately culminating in an unexpected turn of events where the presentation spiraled into chaos. This creative twist highlighted the announcement of Devolver's latest game trailers, featuring the resurgence of 'Volvy,' Devolver's nostalgic nod to classic 90s game mascots, akin to Sonic and Mario, through game sequences from developers such as Nomada, No Brakes Games, Massive Monster Studios, and Dead Toast Entertainment. The presentation was recognized by Vimeo, which awarded it as one of the "Best Branded Staff Picks of 2023".

== Corporate affairs ==
As of December 2024, the company employs 276 people. These included event planning team and staff focused on bringing the company's games to China, though this was later shut down. One key hire was vice-president of mobile publishing Mark Hickey in December 2018, who had been the business manager for Apple Inc.'s App Store.

Devolver Digital operates a film distribution arm, Devolver Digital Films, which was established in 2013. The company also owns another publisher, Good Shepherd Entertainment. A close collaborator to Devolver Digital is Special Reserve Games, a limited-run distributor of physical versions of games. Special Reserve Games was founded in 2016 by CEO Jeff Smith, after he had pitched Wilson the idea of creating a physical release of the PC version of Shadow Warrior 2. Since then, Special Reserve Games has released further physical game releases, limited to only Devolver Digital games, though it is considering to partner with different companies in the future.
