= List of Devolver Digital games =

Devolver Digital is an American video game publisher based in Austin, Texas. The company was founded in June 2009 by Harry Miller, Rick Stults and Mike Wilson, who had co-founded publishing companies Gathering of Developers and Gamecock Media Group. Devolver Digital began by publishing high-definition remakes of games in the Serious Sam series, their first game being Serious Sam HD: The First Encounter. After success with these remakes and spin-off games based on the series, Devolver Digital began publishing games from other, smaller independent studios, one of the first being their breakout title Hotline Miami (2012).

Devolver Digital continued to expand its operations by publishing titles from smaller indie developers, such as Genital Jousting. During this time, it published financially successful video games including Shadow Warrior (2013), The Talos Principle (2014), Enter the Gungeon (2016), and Scum (2020). By 2018, Devolver Digital had quickly grown to sixteen staff members and had published over a hundred games. In August 2020, Devolver Digital published Mediatonic's Fall Guys, which generated $185 million within a month after release. In March 2021, Epic Games acquired Mediatonic, and as a result, Devolver Digital sold all its publishing rights to Fall Guys. Later that year, Devolver Digital became a public company while publishing titles such as Death's Door and Loop Hero. By then, it had wholly acquired several developers, including Croteam, developer of Serious Sam series, Dodge Roll, developer of Enter the Gungeon, Firefly Studios, developer of Stronghold series and Nerial, developer of Reigns.

== Games ==
Year	Title	Developer(s)	Platform(s)
2009	Serious Sam HD: The First Encounter	Croteam	Windows, Xbox 360
2010	Serious Sam HD: The Second Encounter	Croteam	Windows, Xbox 360
2011	Serious Sam Double D	Mommy's Best Games	Windows
2011	Serious Sam: Kamikaze Attack!	Be-Rad Entertainment	Android, iOS, Windows
2011	Serious Sam: The Random Encounter	Vlambeer	Windows
2011	Serious Sam 3: BFE	Croteam	Linux, macOS, Windows, PlayStation 3, Xbox 360
2012	Serious Sam: The Greek Encounter	Eric Ruth Games	Windows
2012	To-Fu: The Trials of Chi	HotGen	Android, Windows
2012	Spacelings	HotGen	Android, Windows
2012	Hotline Miami	Dennaton Games	Android, Linux, macOS, Nintendo Switch, PlayStation 3, PlayStation 4, PlayStation Vita, Windows, Xbox One
2012	To-Fu 2	HotGen	Windows
2013	Serious Sam Double D XXL	Mommy's Best Games	Windows, Xbox 360
2013	Duke Nukem 3D: Megaton Edition	3D Realms, General Arcade	Linux, macOS, PlayStation 3, PlayStation Vita, Windows
2013	Dungeon Hearts	Cube Roots	iOS, Linux, macOS, Windows
2013	Shadow Warrior Classic Redux	3D Realms, General Arcade	Android, Linux, macOS, Windows
2013	Foul Play	Mediatonic	Linux, macOS, PlayStation 4, PlayStation Vita, Windows, Xbox 360
2013	Shadow Warrior	Flying Wild Hog	Linux, macOS, PlayStation 4, Windows, Xbox One
2013	Viscera Cleanup Detail: Shadow Warrior	RuneStorm	Windows
2013	Defense Technica	Kuno Interactive	macOS, Windows, Xbox 360
2014	Cosmic DJ	GL33k	iOS, macOS, Windows
2014	Luftrausers	Vlambeer	Android, Linux, macOS, PlayStation 3, PlayStation Vita, Windows
2014	Always Sometimes Monsters	Vagabond Dog	Android, iOS, Linux, macOS, Windows, PlayStation 4
2014	Dungeon Hearts Blitz	Tangent	Android, iOS
2014	OlliOlli	Roll7	Android, Linux, macOS, Windows
2014	Gods Will Be Watching	Deconstructeam	Android, iOS, Linux, macOS, Windows
2014	The Expendabros	Free Lives	macOS, Windows
2014	Hatoful Boyfriend	PigeoNation Inc., Mediatonic	Android, iOS, Linux, macOS, PlayStation 4, PlayStation Vita, Windows
2014	Heavy Bullets	Terri Vellmann	Linux, macOS, Windows
2014	Sigils of Elohim	Croteam	Android, iOS, Linux, macOS, Windows
2014	The Talos Principle	Croteam	Android, iOS, Linux, macOS, Nintendo Switch, PlayStation 4, Windows, Xbox One
2014	Fork Parker's Holiday Profit Hike	Dodge Roll	macOS, Windows
2015	Hotline Miami 2: Wrong Number	Dennaton Games, Abstraction Games	Android, Linux, macOS, Nintendo Switch, PlayStation 3, PlayStation 4, PlayStation Vita, Windows, Xbox One
2015	Titan Souls	Acid Nerve	Android, macOS, PlayStation 4, PlayStation Vita, Windows
2015	Not a Hero	Roll7	Android, Linux, macOS, Nintendo Switch, PlayStation 4, Windows, Xbox One
2015	Ronin	Tomasz Wacławek	Linux, macOS, PlayStation 4, PlayStation Vita, Windows
2015	Breach & Clear: Deadline	Mighty Rabbit Studios, Gun Media	Linux, macOS, Windows
2015	OlliOlli2: Welcome to Olliwood	Roll7	Android, Linux, macOS, Windows
2015	Dropsy	Tendershoot, A Jolly Corpse	Android, iOS, Linux, macOS, Windows
2015	A Fistful of Gun	FarmerGnome	Windows
2015	Broforce	Free Lives	Linux, macOS, Nintendo Switch, PlayStation 4, Windows, Xbox One
2015	Downwell	Moppin	Android, iOS, Nintendo Switch, PlayStation 4, PlayStation Vita, Windows
2015	Pathologic Classic HD	Ice-Pick Lodge, General Arcade	Windows
2015	Noct (early access)	C3SK	Linux, macOS, Windows
2015	Hatoful Boyfriend: Holiday Star	PigeoNation Inc., Mediatonic	Linux, macOS, PlayStation 4, PlayStation Vita, Windows
2016	#SelfieTennis	VRUnicorns	Windows
2016	Enter the Gungeon	Dodge Roll	Linux, macOS, Nintendo Switch, PlayStation 4, Windows, Xbox One
2016	OmniBus	Buddy Cops, LLC	Linux, macOS, Windows
2016	Reigns	Nerial	Android, iOS, Linux, macOS, Nintendo Switch, Windows
2016	Okhlos	Coffee Powered Machine	Linux, macOS, Windows
2016	Mother Russia Bleeds	Le Cartel Studio	Linux, macOS, Nintendo Switch, PlayStation 4, Windows
2016	Shadow Warrior 2	Flying Wild Hog	PlayStation 4, Windows, Xbox One
2017	Stories Untold	No Code	macOS, Nintendo Switch, PlayStation 4, Windows, Xbox One
2017	Sub Rosa (early access)	Cryptic Sea	Linux, macOS, Windows
2017	Serious Sam VR: The First Encounter	Croteam	Linux, Windows
2017	Serious Sam VR: The Second Encounter	Croteam	Linux, Windows
2017	Golf for Workgroups (early access)	Cryptic Sea	Linux, macOS, Windows
2017	Spaceplan	Jake Hollands	Android, iOS, macOS, Windows
2017	Strafe	Pixel Titans	Linux, macOS, PlayStation 4, Windows
2017	Block'hood	Plethora Project	Linux, macOS, Windows
2017	Serious Sam's Bogus Detour	Crackshell	Linux, Windows
2017	Absolver	Sloclap	PlayStation 4, Windows, Xbox One
2017	Serious Sam VR: The Last Hope	Croteam	Windows
2017	Ruiner	Reikon Games	Linux, Nintendo Switch, PlayStation 4, Windows, Xbox One
2017	The Talos Principle VR	Croteam	Linux, Windows
2017	Serious Sam 3 VR: BFE	Croteam	Linux, Windows
2017	High Hell	Terri Vellmann, Doseone	macOS, Windows
2017	Reigns: Her Majesty	Nerial	Android, iOS, Linux, macOS, Nintendo Switch, Windows
2018	Genital Jousting	Free Lives	Windows
2018	The Red Strings Club	Deconstructeam	Linux, macOS, Nintendo Switch, Windows
2018	Crossing Souls	Fourattic	Linux, macOS, Nintendo Switch, PlayStation 4, Windows
2018	Umiro	Diceroll Studios	Android, iOS, macOS, Windows
2018	Minit	JW, Kitty, Jukio, Dom	Linux, macOS, Nintendo Switch, PlayStation 4, Windows, Xbox One
2018	Block'hood VR	Plethora Project, General Arcade	Windows
2018	The Swords of Ditto	Onebitbeyond	iOS, Linux, macOS, Nintendo Switch, PlayStation 4, Windows
2018	I Hate Running Backwards	Binx Interactive	Linux, PlayStation 4, Nintendo Switch, Windows, Xbox One
2018	The Messenger	Sabotage Studio	Windows, Nintendo Switch, PlayStation 4, Xbox One
2018	Reigns: Game of Thrones	Nerial	Android, iOS, Linux, macOS, Nintendo Switch, Windows
2018	Gris	Nomada Studio	Android, iOS, macOS, Nintendo Switch, PlayStation 4, PlayStation 5, Windows, Xbox One, Xbox Series X/S
2019	Pikuniku	Sectordub	Nintendo Switch, Windows, Xbox One
2019	Fork Parker's Crunch Out	Mega Cat Studios	Super Nintendo Entertainment System
2019	Ape Out	Gabe Cuzzillo	Nintendo Switch, Windows
2019	Weedcraft Inc	Vile Monarch	Windows
2019	Katana Zero	Askiisoft	Android, iOS, macOS, Nintendo Switch, Windows, Xbox One
2019	Observation	No Code	PlayStation 4, Windows, Xbox One
2019	Gato Roboto	Doinksoft	Nintendo Switch, Windows, Xbox One
2019	Devolver Bootleg	Doinksoft	Windows
2019	My Friend Pedro	DeadToast Entertainment	Nintendo Switch, PlayStation 4, Windows, Xbox One
2019	Gorn	Free Lives	Windows, PlayStation 4, PlayStation 5, Meta Quest 2
2019	Metal Wolf Chaos XD	FromSoftware, General Arcade	PlayStation 4, Windows, Xbox One
2019	Witcheye	Moon Kid	Android, iOS, macOS, Nintendo Switch, Windows
2019	Heave Ho	Le Cartel Studio	Nintendo Switch, Windows
2019	Serious Sam Classics: Revolution	Croteam, Alligator Pit	Windows
2019	Exit the Gungeon	Dodge Roll, Singlecore Games	iOS, Nintendo Switch, tvOS, Windows
2019	Cricket Through the Ages	Free Lives	iOS, macOS, tvOS
2019	Bleak Sword	More8Bit	iOS, macOS, tvOS
2019	Painty Mob	Flee Punk	iOS, macOS, tvOS
2020	Sludge Life	Terri Vellmann, Doseone	Nintendo Switch, Windows
2020	Devolverland Expo	Flying Wild Hog	Windows
2020	Carrion	Phobia Game Studio	Android, iOS, Linux, macOS, Nintendo Switch, PlayStation 4, PlayStation 5, Windows, Xbox One
2020	Fall Guys: Ultimate Knockout	Mediatonic	PlayStation 4, Windows
2020	Game of Thrones: Tale of Crows	That Silly Studio	iOS, macOS, tvOS
2020	Serious Sam 4	Croteam	PlayStation 4, PlayStation 5, Stadia, Windows, Xbox One, Xbox Series X/S
2020	Disc Room	Terri, Dose, Kitty, and JW	macOS, Nintendo Switch, Windows, Xbox One
2020	Reigns: Beyond	Nerial	iOS, macOS, tvOS, Windows, Nintendo Switch
2020	Enter the Gungeon: House of the Gundead	Dodge Roll, Griffin Aerotech	Arcade
2021	Olija	Skeleton Crew Studio	Nintendo Switch, PlayStation 4, Windows, Xbox One
2021	Minit Fun Racer	JW, Kitty, Jukio, Dom	Windows, Nintendo Switch
2021	Loop Hero	Four Quarters	Android, iOS, Linux, macOS, Nintendo Switch, Windows, Xbox One, Xbox Series X/S
2021	Essays on Empathy	Deconstructeam	Windows
2021	Boomerang X	Dang!	Nintendo Switch, Windows
2021	Death's Door	Acid Nerve	Android, iOS, Nintendo Switch, PlayStation 4, PlayStation 5, Windows, Xbox One, Xbox Series X/S
2021	Blightbound	Ronimo Games	PlayStation 4, Windows, Xbox One
2021	My Friend Pedro: Ripe for Revenge	DeadToast Entertainment	Android, iOS
2021	Inscryption	Daniel Mullins Games	Nintendo Switch, PlayStation 4, PlayStation 5, Windows, Xbox One, Xbox Series X/S
2022	Serious Sam: Siberian Mayhem	Timelock Studio, Croteam	PlayStation 5, Windows, Xbox Series X/S
2022	Shadow Warrior 3	Flying Wild Hog	PlayStation 4, Windows, Xbox One
2022	Tentacular	Firepunchd Games	Meta Quest 2, Windows
2022	Weird West	WolfEye Studios	PlayStation 4, PlayStation 5, Windows, Xbox One, Xbox Series X/S
2022	Serious Sam: Tormental	Gungrounds	Windows
2022	Ragnorium	Vitali Kirpu	Windows
2022	Trek to Yomi	Flying Wild Hog	PlayStation 4, PlayStation 5, Windows, Xbox One, Xbox Series X/S
2022	Card Shark	Nerial	Nintendo Switch, Windows
2022	Poinpy	Moppin	Android, iOS
2022	Demon Throttle	Doinksoft	Nintendo Switch
2022	Cult of the Lamb	Massive Monster	macOS, Nintendo Switch, PlayStation 4, PlayStation 5, Windows, Xbox One, Xbox Series X/S
2022	Return to Monkey Island	Terrible Toybox	Android, iOS, Linux, macOS, Nintendo Switch, PlayStation 5, Windows, Xbox Series X/S
2022	McPixel 3	Sos Sosowski	Nintendo Switch, PlayStation 4, PlayStation 5, Windows, Xbox One, Xbox Series X/S
2023	Devolver Tumble Time	Nopopo	Android, iOS
2023	Terra Nil	Free Lives	Android, iOS, Linux, macOS, Nintendo Switch, Windows
2023	Bleak Sword DX	more8bit	Nintendo Switch, Windows
2023	Sludge Life 2	Terri Vellmann, Doseone	Windows
2023	The Cosmic Wheel Sisterhood	Deconstructeam	Nintendo Switch, Windows
2023	Gunbrella	Doinksoft	Nintendo Switch, Windows
2023	Wizard with a Gun	Galvanic Games	Nintendo Switch, PlayStation 5, Windows, Xbox Series X/S
2023	The Talos Principle 2	Croteam	PlayStation 5, Windows, Xbox Series X/S
2023	KarmaZoo	Pastagames	Nintendo Switch, PlayStation 5, Windows, Xbox Series X/S
2024	Reigns: Three Kingdoms	Nerial	Android, iOS, Nintendo Switch, Windows
2024	Phantom Abyss	Team WIBY	Windows, Xbox Series X/S
2024	Pepper Grinder	Ahr Ech	Nintendo Switch, Windows, PlayStation 4, PlayStation 5, Xbox One, Xbox Series X/S
2024	Children of the Sun	René Rother	Windows
2024	Anger Foot	Free Lives	Linux, macOS, Windows, PlayStation 5
2024	The Crush House	Nerial	Windows
2024	Sumerian Six	Artificer	Windows
2024	The Plucky Squire	All Possible Futures	Nintendo Switch, PlayStation 5, Windows, Xbox Series X/S
2024	Neva	Nomada Studio	macOS, Nintendo Switch, PlayStation 4, PlayStation 5, Windows, Xbox Series X/S
2025	Look Outside	Francis Coulombe	Windows, Nintendo Switch, Nintendo Switch 2, PlayStation 4, PlayStation 5
2025	The Talos Principle: Reawakened	Croteam	Windows, PlayStation 5, Xbox Series X/S
2025	Gorn 2	Cortopia, Free Lives	Windows, PlayStation 5, Meta Quest 2, Meta Quest 3
2025	Shotgun Cop Man	DeadToast Entertainment	Windows, Nintendo Switch
2025	Baby Steps	Gabe Cuzzillo	macOS, PlayStation 5, Windows
2025	Botsu	Peculiar Pixels	Windows
2025	Ball x Pit	Kenny Sun	Windows, macOS, Nintendo Switch, Nintendo Switch 2, PlayStation 5, Xbox Series X/S
2025	Possessor(s)	Heart Machine	Windows, PlayStation 5
2025	Forestrike	Skeleton Crew Studio	Nintendo Switch, Windows
2025	Skate Story	Sam Eng	macOS, Windows, PlayStation 5, Nintendo Switch 2
2026	Quarantine Zone: The Last Check	Brigada Games	Windows, Xbox Series X/S
2026	Reigns: The Witcher	Nerial	Windows, macOS, iOS, Android
2026	Enter the Gungeon 2	Dodge Roll	Windows, Nintendo Switch 2
2026	Starseeker: Astroneer Expeditions	System Era Softworks	Windows, Nintendo Switch 2, PlayStation 5, Xbox Series X/S
2026	Dark Scrolls	Doinksoft	Windows, Nintendo Switch
2026	Heave Ho 2	Le Cartel Studio	Windows, Nintendo Switch, Nintendo Switch 2
2026	Serious Sam: Shatterverse	Behaviour Interactive	Windows, PlayStation 5, Xbox Series X/S
2026	Stick It to the Stickman	Free Lives	macOS, Windows
2026	Mycopunk	Pigeons at Play	Windows, PlayStation 5
2026	Virtue and a Sledgehammer	Deconstructeam, Selkie Harbour	Windows
2026	Volvy's Adventure: Reslimed	Doinksoft	Windows
2026	The Dungeon Experience	Bone Assembly	Windows
2027	Pikuniku 2	Sectordub	Windows, Nintendo Switch 2
2027	Tenjutsu	Deepnight Games	Windows, Nintendo Switch 2
2027	The Talos Principle 3	Croteam	Windows, PlayStation 5
TBA	Human: Fall Flat 2	No Brakes Games	Windows, Nintendo Switch 2
TBA	Hyperdrop: A Pachinko Roguelike	Dark Dark Goose	Windows
TBA	Minos	Artificer	Windows
TBA	Shroom and Gloom	Team Lazerbeam	macOS, Windows
TBA	Serious Sam: The Third Encounter	Croteam	Windows
TBA	All Army Attack	Blacklight Games	Windows

=== Big Fan Games ===
A label launched by Devolver Digital to publish games based on licensed properties from third party companies. The label took over the publishing rights of Reigns: Game of Thrones, Hellboy Web of Wyrd and John Wick Hex, with the former being originally published by Devolver Digital and the latter two being published by Good Shepherd Entertainment.

Year	Title	Developer	Platform(s)
2025	Tron: Catalyst	Bithell Games	Windows, Nintendo Switch, PlayStation 5, Xbox Series X/S
2025	Monster Train 2	Shiny Shoe	Windows, Nintendo Switch, PlayStation 5, Xbox Series X/S
2026	Warhammer 40,000: Boltgun 2	Auroch Digital	Windows, PlayStation 5, Xbox Series X/S
2026	Acts of Blood	Eksil Team	Windows, PlayStation 5, Xbox Series X/S
