= Omnibus =

Omnibus may refer to:

== Film and television ==
- Omnibus (film), a 1992 French short comedy film
- Omnibus (broadcast), a compilation of Radio or TV episodes
- Omnibus (British TV programme), an arts-based documentary programme
- Omnibus (American TV program), an educational program
- Omnibus (talk show), an Italian series

== Literature ==
- Omnibus edition, a collection of literary works
- Omnibus Press, a book publisher
- Omnibus, a Marvel Comics character associated with the Leader

== Music ==
- Omnibus progression, a harmonic progression containing the entire chromatic scale

=== Albums ===
- Omnibus (album), a 2006 album by Tarkio
- Omnibus, a 2008 album by Blue Mountain
- Omnibus, a 2001 album by Ruby Braff
- Omnibus: The 60s Singles As and Bs, a 1999 album by The Move

=== Songs ===
- "Omnibus", a song by The Move on the B-side of "Wild Tiger Woman"
- "Omnibus", a song by XTC from Nonsuch

== Transportation ==
- Horse-drawn omnibus, a large, enclosed, and sprung horse-drawn vehicle used for passenger transportation.
- Bus, short for motor omnibus, a road vehicle designed to carry passengers.

== Other uses ==
- Omnibus (magazine), an Italian illustrated magazine (1937–1939)
- Omnibus (painting), an 1892 painting by Anders Zorn
- Omnibus (survey), a research method used in interviewing
- OmniBus (video game), a 2016 video game
- Omnibus Promotion, a sound effects company
- Omnibus, a system bus on some varieties of PDP-8 computers
- Omnibus (podcast), a podcast hosted by John Roderick and Ken Jennings

== See also ==
- Anthology film, a feature film consisting of several different short films
- Omnibus bill, a single legislative document containing many laws or amendments
- Omnibus claim, a patent claim which does not explicitly state any technical features of the product or process
- Omnibus clause
- Omnibus hearing
- Omnibus issue, in philately
- Omnibus law (Serbia), a Serbian law regarding Vojvodina
- Omnibus progression, a type of harmonic sequence
- Omnibus spending bill, a single legislative document that sets the budget of many government departments
- Omnibus test, a type of statistical test
- Man on the Clapham omnibus
