= Sludge Life =

2020 video game

- Developers: Doseone; Terri Vellmann
- Publisher: Devolver Digital
- Artist: Terri Vellmann
- Composer: Doseone
- Engine: Unity
- Platforms: Windows, Nintendo Switch
- Release: Windows; May 28, 2020; Switch; June 2, 2021
- Genre: Adventure
- Mode: Single-player

Sludge Life is a 2020 adventure video game developed by Adam "Doseone" Drucker and Terri Vellmann and published by Devolver Digital for Windows. It was the second collaboration between the two and Devolver following High Hell in 2017. Sludge Life was released in 2020 for free for the first year. It has been released along with a soundtrack EP and digital album, as well as ported to the Nintendo Switch. A sequel, Sludge Life 2, was released in 2023.

== Gameplay ==
Sludge Life is an open-world adventure game based on graffiti, parkour, and urban culture. Initially equipped with nothing more than a spray can and laptop, the player must leap and climb to find preset locations for tagging in order to further explore the environment. Tagging (especially difficult tags) enables the player to gain respect from other taggers and eventually allows the player to co-operate with a series of murals. A handful of items found around the world can provide the player with new gameplay features: a camera that can – aside from taking pictures – reveal tagging locations, a glider that can extend the player's airborne distance, a teleporting device called the "warper" that allows the player to place a marker down and teleport back to it any time, and a pair of "vandal eyes" floating in a jar that always look towards the closest tagging location. The laptop can also be updated with 7 apps (music, video, a minigame, etc.), and the player can play basketball, smoke cigarettes, eat some of the food lying around, and "zoom" (the term for using psychedelic mushrooms). There are 100 tags to spray and there are three possible endings. The player cannot die, although there are a handful of environmental hazards – such as fall damage – that will knock the player out causing them to reawaken in a hospital bed.

== Plot ==
Sludge Life is based on the efforts of a graffitist to be recognized by his peers. Set in a fictional 1990's-era oil rig/shipyard, the main character, Ghost, spends time meeting inhabitants, exploring, and spray-painting tags and murals. Exploring the rig and talking to other characters can reveal some of the world's backstory, including secrets about the megacorporation Glug, and revealing a strike against Glug protesting the death of the corporate mascot, Ciggy.

While climbing and exploring the rig, its environs, and the buildings on it, Ghost is able to find three possible endings:

- Finding a large bomb in a bunker, Ghost can blow up the entire world, corrupting the game in the process. (Note: In the sequel, both endings are referenced, making them both canon.)
- Finding the Glug CEO's escape pod, Ghost can leave the shipyard for good.
- Collecting 100 tags and one of the personal items of another tagger will cause Ghost's eyes to be ripped out of their body and enter a psychedelic hallucination.

== Development ==
Sludge Life was developed by Adam Drucker AKA Doseone and Terri Vellmann from Devolver Digital. Previewed at 2020's PAX East (29 February – 1 March), the game demonstrated an emphasis on graffiti, music, resistance, grime, and crass humor. Notably, however, the game was dramatically less violent than the developer's previous High Hell (and later Disc Room). In fact Vellmann's first conception of Sludge Life would be to remove guns entirely. Focusing on NPCs rather than enemies, Drucker and Vellmann began to develop personalities in the new game. Characters were designed based on real people the developers encountered. As ludic aspects developed, Drucker drew from activities of his youth, including running, climbing, and street art. To emphasize the visual aspects of graffiti and its spatial relationship vis-à-vis the observer, parkour became a primary theme.

Music and visuals also began to be emphasized. In adopting psychedelic and vaporwave elements, Vellmann developed an aesthetic style including Ghost's laptop, hallucinogenic "zoom" trips, and the smoggy backgrounds. Drucker developed the music along with Big Mud (Drucker's in-game alterego) and DJ Dead, and a 45rpm EP was released within the laptop as well as in reality on Bandcamp. Sludge Life was released on the Epic Games Store on May 28, 2020, and was offered for free for the first year. The Switch and Steam versions were released as soon as the Epic Games Store version was sold on June 2, 2021. A physical version was planned for Switch.

== Reception ==
Reception

Aggregate score
Aggregator	Score
Metacritic	PC: 73/100; NS: 73/100

Review scores
Publication	Score
Hardcore Gamer	4/5
Nintendo Life	8/10
Nintendo World Report	8/10
Slant Magazine	3.5/5
Screen Rant	3/5

After its initial 2020 release as a free game on Epic Games Store, numerous reviewers encouraged players to test Sludge Life. The second release (allowing Switch and Steam) in 2021, provided additional reviews to examine the game again. Recognized for its laissez-faire exploration which the developers described as a "walking simulator", early reviews emphasized the humor in the game as well as its strange mood/atmosphere. The game was compared to 2000's Jet Set Radio in its themes, but otherwise more similar to visual media like the programming from Adult Swim or Liquid Television from the mid-1990s.

From the initial 2020 release from Epic Games Store, reviewers emphasized the game as having a niche and unique/eccentric vibe. The 1-year free price was also broadly appreciated, and the game was praised for its gameplay and the music. Criticism was primarily limited to controls which were found to be "wonky", however additional criticisms came in the form of its relatively short length and the inelegance of developing its uniqueness. Hardcore Gamer gave the game a score of 4/5.

Reviews of 2021 from Switch, Steam, GOG, etc., were similarly positive with Nintendo Life describing the game as "visually striking", "genuine", and "vibrant", Eurogamer describing it as "astonishingly clever", and Nintendo World Report claiming it as "wild and truly unique. There's really nothing like it. Sludge Life is a vibe". Complaints were limited to the visuals and mechanics which Nintendo Life found to "feel inconsistent" and to potentially cause "confusion between which objects can be climbed like ladders and which cannot". Nintendo World Report also worried that the non-linearity of the game might be off-putting for gamers. Scores of 8/10 were awarded from both Nintendo Life and Nintendo World Report.

=== Controversy ===
Sludge Life was banned by the Australian Classification Board after rating the game a "refused classification" (RC) in June 2021. Although details from the Board were scant, the May 2021 review and re-rate of Disco Elysium: The Final Cut (banned in March 2021) suggested that the reason for Disco Elysium may have been for the same reason: "use of drugs". Similar rating boards like the ESRB (USA) has given Sludge Life similar mature rates such as Mature 17+ (M).

== Sequel ==
Sludge Life 2 was announced on March 23, 2023, releasing later the same year for Windows. It was well received in its preview version. A demo for the sequel called "The Big Mud Sessions" was released on June 8. It acts as a bridge between the two episodes, where Ghost, now a manager of rapper Big Mud, must help Mud perform on a recording in the studio by getting him a Ciggy Cig to ease Mud's anxiety. The sequel was released on June 27.

== See also ==
- Marc Ecko's Getting Up: Contents Under Pressure
- Mirror's Edge
