= Heave-Ho =

Heave-Ho or Heave Ho may refer to:

- Heave Ho, a 2019 video game
- Heave-Ho (1928 film), starring Sid Smith (actor)
- "Heave-Ho", a song by Smash Mouth from the 1997 album Fush Yu Mang
- "Heave-Ho", a song by Cows from the 1992 album Cunning Stunts
- "Heave-Ho", a song by Eslam Jawaad from the 2009 album The Mammoth Tusk
- "Heave-Ho", a 2019 song by Ben Howard
- "Heave Ho", a 2019 song by Lips
- Workers, Let's Go, or Heave-Ho! (Czech: Hej-rup!), a 1934 Czechoslovak comedy film
