= IHRB =

IHRB may refer to:

- I Hate Running Backwards, video game
- Irish Horseracing Regulatory Board, regulates conduct of horse racing in Ireland
