= High Hell =

2017 video game

- Developers: Terri Vellmann; Doseone
- Publisher: Devolver Digital
- Artist: Terri Vellmann
- Composer: Doseone
- Platforms: Windows, macOS
- Release: October 23, 2017
- Genre: First-person shooter
- Mode: Single-player

High Hell is a 2017 first-person shooter video game developed by Terri Vellmann and Adam "Doseone" Drucker and published by Devolver Digital for Windows and macOS. It was released via Steam and itch.io. Both developers had previously collaborated on Heavy Bullets (with Doseone as a composer); they would later collaborate on Sludge Life and Disc Room.

== Gameplay ==
High Hell is a first-person shooter where the player controls an unnamed female luchador as she infiltrates a cartel and massacres its members. The player navigates various levels in the form of linear corridors between buildings, as they shoot enemies in quick succession. A kick attack is available to kick down doors to speed up progress as well as to subdue enemies. The player may also choose to engage in stealth to go unnoticed. One unique feature is that the player only has limited ammunition and cannot reload, forcing the player to complete the level in quick bursts with high accuracy. The game's objectives, aside from defeating enemies, also include saving hostages and burning laundered money.

== Reception ==
Reception

Aggregate scores
Aggregator	Score
Metacritic	79/100
OpenCritic	76% recommend

Review scores
Publication	Score
Destructoid	8/10
VentureBeat	80/100

High Hell received "generally favorable" reviews, according to review aggregator website Metacritic. OpenCritic determined that 76% of critics recommend the game.

Chris Moyse of Destructoid praised its unique and fast-paced gameplay and noting that its intensity overcame the game's extremely short length. Stephanie Chan of VentureBeat noted its chaotic gameplay and absurdist humor to be the game's greatest strengths.
