= Many Nights A Whisper =

2025 video game

- Developers: Selkie Harbour, Deconstructeam
- Publisher: Deconstructeam
- Director: Jordi de Paco
- Designer: Guillermo Ferrando
- Programmer: Guillermo Ferrando
- Artists: Manon Gevers, Marina González, Paula Ruiz
- Writer: Jordi de Paco
- Composer: Paula "Fingerspit" Ruiz
- Platform: Windows
- Release: April 29, 2025
- Genre: Adventure

Many Nights A Whisper is a 2025 video game developed by Valencia, Spain-based studios Selkie Harbour and Deconstructeam.

== Reception ==
Reception

Aggregate score
Aggregator	Score
OpenCritic	83% recommend (Note: Based on 6 reviews)
