= Dead Synchronicity =

2015 point-and-click video game

Dead Synchronicity: Tomorrow Comes Today
- Developer: Fictiorama Studios
- Publisher: Daedalic Entertainment
- Platforms: Linux, OS X, Windows, iOS, Android, PlayStation 4, Nintendo Switch
- Release: Linux, OS X, Windows; April 10, 2015; iOS; August 19, 2015; Android; January 20, 2016; PlayStation 4; October 4, 2016; Nintendo Switch; November 21, 2017
- Genre: Point-and-click adventure
- Mode: Single-player

Dead Synchronicity: Tomorrow Comes Today is an episodic point-and-click adventure game set in a post-apocalyptic future. The game was partly funded through the Kickstarter crowd-funding website, with the first episode released in April 2015.

== Plot ==
Players control Michael, an amnesiac who awakens in the apocalyptic New World, where many humans, known as "the Dissolved", suffer from a terminal disease. Michael navigates the area, attempting to discern the truth behind his situation, while grappling with perplexing visions and dreams that obscure his thoughts.

According to the studio, the game features "space-time distortions, a dystopian atmosphere... and a dark, bloodstained plot".

== Development ==
Fictiorama Studios consists of three brothers, Mario, Luis, and Alberto Oliván, and artist Martín Martínez. This story was pitched by Alberto, and the art, plot, and music were designed to fit his vision. The developers cited influences such as The Secret of Monkey Island, 12 Monkeys, and The Road, among others. The art style borrows from expressionism and tribal art.

One of the main challenges for the production team was designing the non-linear narrative and complex branching-tree dialogue, eventually settling on a software called articy:draft to collect all the data needed to streamline this process.

The game was partly funded through the Kickstarter crowd-funding website, raising $51,501 in April 2014.

== Reception ==
Reception

Aggregate scores
Aggregator	Score
Metacritic	PC: 70/100; PS4: 69/100; NS: 72/100
OpenCritic	70/100; 33% Critics Recommend

According to Carsten Fichtelmann of Daedalic Entertainment, Dead Synchronicity was a commercial flop. He said in 2016, "Unfortunately, it did not sell well, only a few thousand units, so we had to say to the developers that we cannot put money in a second game, because we lost money with its first part."

PC World praised the game as a brave and "surprisingly disturbing" title, but said it lacked a "catharsis" due to its abrupt end and lack of narrative cohesion in gameplay. John Walker, writing at Rock, Paper, Shotgun had been very enthusiastic about the game during its Kickstarter campaign. However, upon reviewing the first chapter, he too was disappointed with its abrupt ending.

The PlayStation 4 port received positives reviews, with Crash Landed scoring it 4 stars, praising the game's control method: "Developers Fictiorama Studios have gone a step further and transformed Dead Synchronicity - a game that would usually be more suited for the PC space - to feel right at home on the console using a controller, thanks to some smart game design decisions." Kai Powell of wccftech scored the game a 7.7, praising its "macabre" setting; meanwhile, Jose A. Rodríguez of IGN scored the title 7.8.

== See also ==
- Do Not Feed the Monkeys
