= Do Not Feed the Monkeys =

2018 adventure simulation video game

- Developer: Fictiorama Studios
- Publisher: Alawar Premium
- Platforms: Microsoft Windows, iOS, Apple TV, PlayStation 4, Nintendo Switch
- Release: Microsoft Windows; 24 October 2018 iOS, Apple TV; 24 July 2019; PlayStation 4; 24 September 2020
- Genres: Adventure, life simulation
- Mode: Single-player

Do Not Feed the Monkeys is a 2018 adventure and life simulation video game developed by the Fictiorama Studios and published by Alawar Premium for Windows and PlayStation 4.

== Gameplay ==
Do Not Feed the Monkeys casts the player as a spy who monitors multiple live video feeds via an in-game desktop computer. The player gathers information about people and objects caught on these feeds, while managing life simulation elements such as the player character's health and apartment rent. Although the player is told not to interact with the people under surveillance, it is possible to do so, which provides bonuses but endangers the player character.

== Development ==
Spanish company Fictiorama conceived Do Not Feed the Monkeys around the time that it completed its debut game, Dead Synchronicity. Hoping to explore the concept of voyeurism, the team drew inspiration from the film Rear Window and the website Insecam, which allows users to view unsecure surveillance camera footage from around the world. According to Fictiorama's Luis Oliván, the company's chief goal with Do Not Feed the Monkeys was player immersion coupled with a sense of agency. Nevertheless, the game also provides social commentary on issues related to mass surveillance and social media.

== Reception ==
Do Not Feed the Monkey received a "Generally favorable" score on Metacritic with an average score of 77 based on 18 reviews.

Do Not Feed the Monkeys was nominated for three awards at the 2019 Independent Games Festival, including the Seumas McNally Grand Prize. HobbyConsolas named it one of 2018's best Spanish-made games, and Edge España nominated it for the magazine's "Spanish Video Game of the Year" award, although the game lost to The Red Strings Club. Edge España's editors similarly nominated Fictiorama as their pick for 2018's best Spanish game developer, a distinction that ultimately went to Nomada Studio for its work on Gris. The game also won the award for "Best FS Play" at the 2018 Titanium Awards; in addition, it was nominated for "Independent Creator" at the 2020 Webby Awards.
