= Essays on Empathy =

- Steam header art
- Developer: Deconstructeam
- Publisher: Devolver Digital
- Platform: Windows
- Release: 18 May 2021
- Genre: Adventure
- Mode: Single-player

Essays on Empathy is a 2021 video game compilation by Spanish independent developer Deconstructeam and published by Devolver Digital. The game contains ten short "interactive stories", including one new title, De Tres al Cuarto, developed specifically for the compilation. Following the onset of the coronavirus pandemic in 2020, which negatively impacted the development team, the compilation was created as a side project to provide greater focus for the studio's previous shorter titles, many created for game jams. Upon release, Essays on Empathy received generally favorable reviews, with critics praising the game's ambitious narrative approach, treatment of complex themes, and additional making-of features, whilst critiquing the short duration of games and the absence of bugfixes and quality of life features.

== Gameplay ==
Essays on Empathy is an anthology of ten games developed and released by Deconstructeam, with the exception of one title, De Tres Al Cuarto, being a new work created for the game. Games are presented in a menu, with each being playable in any order. Selecting a game allows players to access a submenu that contains the game and an accompanying soundtrack, production sketches and documentary outlining the creation of the game.

=== List of games ===
Title	Original release date	Description
Underground Hangovers	20 April 2015	A metroidvania-styled platformer in which the player assists a group of miners abandoned on the planet they were excavating.
Supercontinent LTD	30 August 2016	A point-and-click adventure game in which the player is a hacker investigating the titular corporation Supercontinent.
Behind Every Great One	23 August 2018	A narrative-based management game in which the player is Victorine, a housewife living with her husband, an artist. Victorine has a limited time each day to undertake household chores, who is increasingly frustrated and reproached by her husband on her failure to complete all of the tasks on time.
Eternal Home Floristry	4 December 2018	
The Bookshelf Limbo	20 February 2020	An interactive fiction game in which the player browses a shelf in a bookstore to find a book to gift their father. Players select books on the shelf and can browse the synopsis and quotes on the back, and check online reviews. As the player character considers their options, they wrestle with their own doubts on the meaning and impact of their gift based on the books selected, revealing personal insights on the character's relationship with their father.
Zen and the Art of Transhumanism	2016	Described as a "cyberpunk pottery game", players operate a transhumanist workshop and operate a lathe and tools to sculpt body implants that enhance human traits. Gameplay consists of players taking orders from clients presenting with a personal problem, selecting databank modules that reflect the shape of the desired implant, and using the tools to shape it into the form required. Players are given decisions to make on which implants best resolve the personal problems presented by the client.
Engolasters January 2021	1 August 2017	An exploration-based mystery game in which players assume the role of Meritxell, a paranormal researcher attempting to prove the existence of extraterrestrials.
11:45 A Vivid Life	25 October 2018	A narrative horror game in which the player character, Laynie, believes her skeleton does not belong to her and undertakes an operation to remove foreign objects from her body. Players operate an x-ray machine to identify foreign bodies and can remove the objects from her body at a picnic basket. The player has multiple choice options in dialogue to react to the findings, each influencing the end conclusion the character makes about her body.
Dear Substance of Kin	30 April 2019	
De Tres Al Cuarto	N/A	The player is Garza, half of a double act with his comedic and romantic partner Bonachera who are making ends meet performing stand-up comedy shows Mallorca. Players alternate across several days of performing comedy sets and selecting activities to spend the night after the show. During comedy sets of the game, players, draw, select and play cards representing the delivery of the duo's performance in a manner similar to a deck-building game. Cards have different effects on money earned by the player, such as a successful joke being delivered with a 'Poor' or 'Punch' card, or a 'Build' card that increases the value of the joke and provides the player with a new hand. Money earned by the player in a comedy set can be used to remove, upgrade or purchase new cards.

== Development ==
Essays on Empathy was developed by Valencia studio Deconstructeam, a trio of writer and designer Jordi de Paco, artist Marina González and musician Paula Ruiz. The compilation, containing titles developed between 2015 and 2021, had the stated aim of giving the studio's short games a wider audience, as they had received less attention. The compilation was assembled as a side project and "therapeutic" exercise during a creative hiatus for the studio, who had paused work on a larger title, The Cosmic Wheel Sisterhood due to the impacts of the coronavirus pandemic in 2020, which had a negative psychological impact on the developers. The title of the compilation was set to reflect the "different characters" depicted in the various games and the overarching design process of the studio, with de Paco discussing that the team began purposefully developing games with a "heavy" narrative focus over time to explore complex situations or questions that require the player to "put themselves into the game". Most of the games for Essays on Empathy were previously developed and released for short-term game jams including the Ludum Dare, with the games largely presented as they were originally released in terms of content. The compilation was announced on 30 April 2021 with the release of an announcement trailer for release on May 18.

== Reception ==
Reception

Aggregate score
Aggregator	Score
Metacritic	80/100

Review scores
Publication	Score
Eurogamer	6/10
Checkpoint Gaming	9/10
Digitally Downloaded	5/5
Game Rant	3.5/5
GamesHub	5/5
Meristation	8/10
Vandal	8/10

Essays on Empathy received "generally favorable" reviews upon release, according to review aggregator Metacritic. Critics generally praised the narrative and themes of the various games in the compilation. Laura Luna of MeriStation considered the narrative design to be the "strong point" of the game in its sensitive and natural treatment of "social and intimate themes", considering them to explore diverse perspectives from "an enriching and authentic perspective". Harvard Liu of Digitally Downloaded discussed the compilation's games to each explore a narrative of "coping" and balance a tone of humor and poignancy. Marina Delgreco of Game Rant considered the games to be "poignant" and also confronting due to the "heavy subject matter", providing players with a chance to "step into the shoes of people different from them and understand them a bit better than before". Eurogamer found the games to explore "terribly real" themes in a "raw and truthful" manner, although finding the concepts were not fully matured due to the short length and development periods of the individual titles. Similarly, many critics acknowledged that the games, developed during game jams, were limited in their scope as short experiences, with Amy Campbell of The Escapist considering the games to improve in the order of chronological release and some to be "a tad too simple".

De Tres Al Cuarto received specific praise as a standalone release and highlight of the compilation. Describing the game as a "fresh, original interactive story", PC Gamer UK commended the game's "mature" depiction of an established gay relationship and its "vividly drawn" and "believable" characters. However, the magazine also found the comedy sections to be less effective due to the sound design and poor distinction between the successful and unsuccessful jokes. Harvard Liu of Digitally Downloaded considered the deckbuilding mechanic to effectively "communicate aspiration rather than strategy", with the game's diminishing returns on its strategy mechanics over time conveying deeper "questions of value and self-worth". Laura Luna of MeriStation assessed that De Tres Al Cuarto was the "most refined" work of the compilation, describing the game's depiction of the couple's intimate moments as a "very human" romantic dilemma. Manu Delgado of Vandal wrote that the game demonstrated the "mastery" of the studio in "giving life to unique characters interacting in credible situations narrated from the familiarity of more or less everyday scenes".

The game's behind-the-scenes additions were also generally praised. Harvard Liu of Digitally Downloaded found the collection "shines a light on craft and deepens the connection between player and developer". Laura Luna of MeriStation stated that the features providing "interesting" context for the player to understand "certain artistic decisions and the reason for experimenting with certain mechanics". Manu Delgado of Vandal strongly praised the content as demonstrating "unusual" levels of "honesty" and "transparency" in the studio's creative approach "rarely seen" in documentaries about video games. However, Delgado also considered the presentation of the features to lack accessibility due to the "poorly readable" menu text and lack of playback controls on videos.

Several reviewers identified that the game had bugs and quality of life issues due to the games being presented in the state they were at upon release. Checkpoint Gaming noted that all games lacked menus, save states and pause functions, although considered these issues to be of "little consequence" and assisted in making players to commit to the gameplay experience. Harvard Liu of Digitally Downloaded speculated the game's technical issues reflected their packaging "exactly as they were at the end of their respective game jams, with UI quirks and typos left in". Non-English sources also lamented the game did not include localisation.
