= The Red Strings Club =

2018 adventure game

- Developer: Deconstructeam
- Publisher: Devolver Digital
- Director: Jordi de Paco
- Producer: Andrew Parsons
- Designer: Jordi de Paco
- Programmer: Jordi de Paco
- Artist: Marina González
- Writer: Jordi de Paco
- Composer: Paula "Fingerspit" Ruiz
- Engine: GameMaker Studio
- Platforms: Windows, macOS, Linux, Nintendo Switch
- Release: 22 January 2018; Nintendo Switch; 14 March 2019
- Genre: Adventure
- Mode: Single-player

The Red Strings Club is a 2018 adventure game developed by Deconstructeam and published by Devolver Digital. It was originally released on Windows, macOS and Linux in January 2018, with a Nintendo Switch version released in March 2019.

== Gameplay and plot ==
The Red Strings Club is an adventure game set in a cyberpunk world. In this world, devices implanted in humans have become commonplace as a way to alter one's physical features and mental functions; a corporation called Supercontinent Ltd., led by a mysterious CEO, is at the forefront of this human implant industry. The game itself centers around three main (playable) characters: Brandeis, an enhanced human and "freelance hacker"; Donovan, an implantless human and owner of The Red Strings Club; and Akara-184, an android formerly owned by Supercontinent to administer implant surgery to customers and who possesses advanced empathy capabilities. Donovan, Brandeis, and Akara-184 are working together to stop Supercontinent from releasing a system known as Social Psyche Welfare, which alters the minds of all implanted humans in order to eliminate emotions such as anger and depression; Donovan's interactions with Akara-184 and employees of Supercontinent encourages the player to consider the role of and extent to which technology should alter one's humanity.

Gameplay screenshot.

The Red Strings Club utilizes several different styles of gameplay throughout with each of its playable characters. The bulk of the game involves Donovan mixing different types of drinks in order to bring out certain emotions in his bar's patrons, which allows him to probe them for information; however, some emotional states are more volatile than others, running the risk of cutting the conversation short and missing out on certain intelligence that could have been collected. At the end of each encounter, Akara-184 will test Donovan on each character's motivations and feelings; if he guesses most of the questions correctly, he receives an item that can enhance his drinks (and, in one instance, gains access to a new character).

While playing as Akara-184 within a Supercontinent Ltd. facility, the player crafts different sets of implants made of biomass via pottery wheel that are to be inserted in clients, based on what will best help their careers or desires. Towards the end of this section of the game, the player inserts implants for Supercontinent executives, however, are encouraged by a human hacker intruder (who is associated with Brandeis), to assign them specially designed implants that will make them less corporately focused; the implants that the player chooses to insert will have an effect on these executives later on in the game.

At the end of the game, like Brandeis, the player infiltrates Supercontinent Ltd. headquarters in order to stop the SPW program, but needs to go through several bureaucratic hoops in order to do so; in order to achieve his goal, Brandeis uses one of his implants to impersonate Supercontinent executives and glean the information needed to access restricted files and run a virus to shut down Social Psyche Welfare. Just before succeeding, though, Brandeis is surrounded by Akara and several clones of them - it is here that Akara reveals that they are an AI of uncertain origin that's slowly been manipulating human technological process via the internet for years and intends to launch the SPW as a sort of final act. After this encounter, Brandeis is shot by Supercontinent security forces and falls out of Supercontinent's skyscraper to his demise, as seen in the beginning cutscene of the game. As he falls, Brandeis calls Donovan, and they declare their love for one another.

== Development and release ==
The Red Strings Club was developed by Deconstructeam. The game was announced in October 2017. The game was published by Devolver Digital and released for Windows, macOS and Linux on 22 January 2018. It was released on Nintendo Switch in March 2019.

== Reception ==
Reception

Aggregate score
Aggregator	Score
Metacritic	80/100

Review scores
Publication	Score
Destructoid	8/10
Game Informer	8/10
Nintendo Life	8/10

The Red Strings Club received "generally favorable" reviews from critics according to review aggregator Metacritic.

The Spanish edition of Edge magazine gave it a 9/10.

One of the characters Donovan encounters at The Red Strings Club is a marketing director named Larissa. During Brandeis' section, Larissa is revealed as transgender by her password, which is her "deadname" (name given at birth). Danielle Riendeau of Vice considered it offensive to use a deadname as a clue and criticized making someone's gender identity a plot twist. Paula Ruiz, a developer of The Red Strings Club who is transgender, said it is important to denounce deadnaming but that "it's also a part of trans people's realities" and the game's usage was not frivolous.

=== Awards ===
The game won the award for "Best National Development" at the Titanium Awards 2018, whereas its other nomination was for "Best Indie Game".

== See also ==
- VA-11 HALL-A, another cyberpunk adventure game that involves bartending and mixing drinks
- Do Not Feed the Monkeys
- Gris
