= To-Fu: The Trials of Chi =

2011 video game

- Developer(s): HotGen
- Publisher(s): HotGen (iOS); Devolver Digital (Android, Windows); Rising Star Games (DS)
- Platform(s): iOS, Android, Nintendo DS, Microsoft Windows
- Release: iOS; 26 May 2011; Android; 18 May 2012; Nintendo DS: NA: 24 July 2012; EU: 29 June 2012; Windows; 14 November 2012
- Genre(s): Action, puzzle
- Mode(s): Single-player

To-Fu: The Trials of Chi is a 2011 action puzzle video game developed and published by British studio HotGen for iOS. It was released by Devolver Digital for Android and Microsoft Windows and Rising Star Games for the Nintendo DS in 2012, as its first non-Serious Sam game. Two sequels were released, To-Fu 2 in 2011 and To-Fu Fury in 2014.

== Gameplay ==
To-Fu: The Trials of Chi is a puzzle game. The player controls the protagonist, a piece of tofu, by dragging and flinging them around the level. Levels have obstacles, and the behavior of the protagonist when encountering an obstacle depends on its material. For example, the character will bounce off of metal surfaces and slide down glass ones. The goal of each level is to reach a fortune cookie, and each stage has a limited number of moves, as well as optional goals such as collecting orbs. The game released with 100 levels, and more were added over time, with 180 by July 2011.

== Development and release ==
The game was developed by London-based studio HotGen, who first released it for iOS on 26 May 2011. Devolver Digital ported the game to Android on 18 May 2012, and Windows on 14 November 2012. Rising Star Games released a version for Nintendo DS titled To-Fu Collection in 2012, which contained the levels of To-Fu and To-Fu 2.

== Reception ==
Reception

Aggregate score
Aggregator	Score
Metacritic	82/100 (HD) 80/100

Review scores
Publication	Score
Eurogamer	8/10
Jeuxvideo.com	15/20
MacLife	4/5
Pocket Gamer	3.5/5
TouchArcade	4/5

The iOS version received "generally favorable reviews" on both platforms according to the review aggregation website Metacritic.

Jeuxvideo.com praised the general atmosphere of the game, puzzle design, and the quantity and variety of levels, but were more negative on the soundtrack, commenting that there was a single song. MacLife similarly praised the level design, character, and controls, but saw the lack of leaderboards as a negative. In a less positive review, Pocket Gamer considered the game fun, but described it as "agonisingly short of greatness", citing the inability to instantly restart levels and the control scheme.

Comparing To-Fu to Super Meat Boy, TouchArcade described it as similarly difficult but more slow-paced. They complimented the game's level design and considered the contrasting objectives as making the game appeal to a broad range of people, but were less positive on the art and music.

The game was nominated for "Best Mobile Game" at the 2011 Golden Joystick Awards.
