= Spaceplan =

Incremental game

- Developer: Jake Hollands
- Publisher: Devolver Digital
- Platforms: Android iOS macOS; Microsoft Windows
- Release: 3 May, 2017
- Mode: Single-player

Spaceplan is a 2016 clicker web game developed by Jake Hollands, as well as a 2017 expanded version published by Devolver Digital on 3 May, 2017 for Android, iOS, macOS, and Microsoft Windows, a day earlier than its intended launch date of the 4 May. In the game, the player is stuck on a ship in orbit around an unknown planet, whose only power source is potatoes. The player must gather resources in order to unlock stronger tools, with which to increase their resource gathering abilities. The game received universally positive reviews from critics, who stated that its narrative sci-fi elements improved the otherwise simplistic gameplay.

== Reception ==
The expanded version of Spaceplan received an aggregate score of 89/100 for its iOS edition. Carter Dotson of TouchArcade rated the game 100/100, calling it a "cool and engaging experience", and recommended it even to skeptics of the genre. Jim Squires of Gamezebo rated it 90/100, calling the game's narrative "funny" and "clever", but criticizing its short length. Christian Valentin of Pocket Gamer rated the game 4/5 stars, saying that "while the gameplay is what you'd expect from a clicker, the game is "uniquely enjoyable and humorous". Lauren Morton of PC Gamer commented that it "makes an argument for a new niche genre".
