= Viscera Cleanup Detail =

2015 video game

- Developer: RuneStorm
- Publisher: RuneStorm
- Engine: Unreal Engine 3
- Platforms: Windows, OS X
- Release: 23 October 2015
- Genre: Simulation
- Modes: Single-player, multiplayer

Viscera Cleanup Detail is a 2015 science fiction simulation video game where players are tasked to clean up the bloody aftermath of a successfully repelled alien invasion, zombie outbreak and other types of disasters. The game was developed and published by South Africa–based indie developer studio RuneStorm and was released on 4 April 2014 through Steam Early Access. The full release became available on 23 October 2015.

== Gameplay ==
In Viscera Cleanup Detail, players are given the role of "Space-Station Janitors", tasked with cleaning and repairing facilities that have been the scene of bloody battles during an alien invasion or another form of disaster. Tasks include gathering and disposing of debris, including dismembered bodies of aliens and humans, spent shell casings and broken glass; restocking of wall-mounted first aid kits; repairing bullet holes in walls; and cleaning blood splatter and soot marks from floors, walls and ceilings; as well as secondary bonus tasks. These include stacking items like crates and barrels in a designated stacking area and filing disaster reports on the events and deaths that took place in a corresponding level.

To accomplish these tasks, players carry a mop to help clean up any blood pools or soot found around the station, a sensor device to detect traces of biological or non-biological messes, and a small PDA to take notes on the level. Players may also interact with debris and other items with their empty hands. A patch later added a broom item, which players could find lying around every map of the game to help sweep up bullet casings or other trash.

Deployed throughout each level are janitorial machines that players use to help clean: an incinerator for disposal of debris; a bucket dispenser, which is the only source of clean water; a dispenser for bins that can be used to carry multiple smaller items such as cans, casings and even body parts; a welding device for repairing bullet holes in the walls; and an item vending machine where the player can get additional items such as lanterns, first aid kit restocking supplies, "wet floor" signs and flares. Occasionally, bucket and bin dispensers may malfunction and instead dispense one or more pieces of bloody debris, resulting in additional debris and bloodstains to be cleaned up.

It is also possible to spread blood by dropping debris, attempting to use a dirtied mop, spilling used buckets, or by tracking blood on the bottom of the player's boots, so some care and planning are necessary to avoid re-cleaning the same area multiple times.

Players may "punch out" at any time to end the level. After punching out of a level, players are taken to a small collection of rooms known as "The Office". The Office acts as an interactive way for players to see how well they may have performed on the previously completed level. As well as a large report screen displaying the player's score in the form of a percentile, several news articles can also be found scattered around The Office's main room. These detailed events are caused by the player's oversights, such as employees consuming viscera, tripping over buckets, choking on discarded bullet shells, and show the player what they may have missed upon completing a level. The Office also serves as a place to collect items, which can be brought from successfully completed levels via the "Janitor's Trunk".

There is no set time limit, but there are penalties for not fully completing the level. If the player has not sufficiently cleaned a level and scored less than 75%, they will be "fired", causing The Office to reset and any items or changes made within will be lost.

== Stand-alone expansions ==
During the development of Viscera Cleanup Detail, RuneStorm created two stand-alone expansions of their own game, which featured the same mechanics but different settings.

- Viscera Cleanup Detail: Shadow Warrior is set in the first chapter of Flying Wild Hog's Shadow Warrior, cleaning up the mess Lo Wang left in the original game. It was released on 11 October 2013 and published by Devolver Digital.
- Viscera Cleanup Detail: Santa's Rampage takes place on the North Pole, inside Santa's workshop. The players find themselves in the aftermath of Santa going into a violent rampage, murdering his elves and reindeer. It was released on 13 December 2013.

== Downloadable content ==
On 17 July 2015, during the game's Early Access phase, RuneStorm released a DLC for Viscera Cleanup Detail, which includes the complete soundtrack that is played by the in-game radio in the main game and both stand-alone expansions.

On 29 October 2015—just six days after the game's full release—a Halloween DLC pack entitled Viscera Cleanup Detail: House of Horror was put up on Steam, featuring a crime scene of a house, where an unsolved mass murder has happened, while the player gets to uncover it during the gameplay.

On 10 December 2018, a new DLC entitled Viscera Cleanup Detail: The Vulcan Affair was released, where players must clean up the secret island lair of a supervillain whose plans for world domination had just been foiled.

== Reception ==
The early access version of the game received several reviews. At Eurogamer, Dan Whitehead wrote that while many video games revolve around the concept of clearing a screen, such as killing all the enemies or collecting all the tokens, Viscera Cleanup Detail literalises the metaphor. Writing for The A.V. Club, Chaz Evans called it a commentary on first-person shooters that focuses on the consequences of violence. After the game's commercial release, Philippa Warr of Rock, Paper, Shotgun included it on her list of the top games of 2015 and later described the game's multiplayer as not only a way to keep in touch with people but also to learn about them through how they approach the game's seemingly mundane tasks.
