= I Hate Running Backwards =

2018 video game

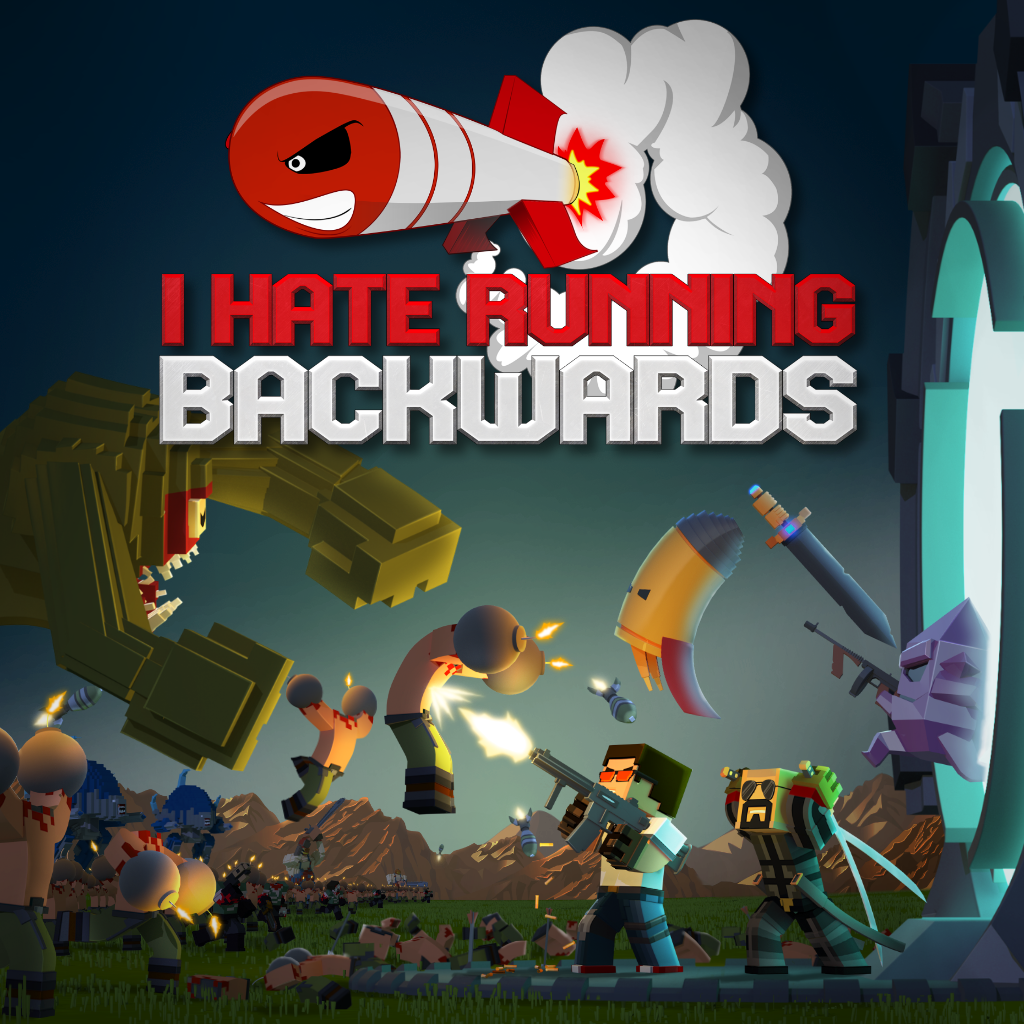
- Developer: Binx Interactive
- Publisher: Devolver Digital
- Designers: Filip Kovač; Matko Šimecki
- Programmers: Nikola Đurinec; Denis Mraović
- Artists: Filip Kovač; Matko Šimecki
- Composers: Damjan Mravunac; Demolite
- Series: Serious Sam
- Engine: Unity
- Platforms: PlayStation 4; Windows; Xbox One; Linux; Nintendo Switch
- Release: PS4, Windows, XONE; 22 May 2018; Linux; 28 June 2018; Switch; 19 October 2018
- Genre: Shoot 'em up
- Modes: Single-player, multiplayer

I Hate Running Backwards is a 2018 shoot 'em up game developed by Binx Interactive and published by Devolver Digital. One or two players traverse procedurally generated levels using several characters, including Sam "Serious" Stone, the protagonist of the Serious Sam series. The screen scrolls vertically as the player character runs backwards through a partially destructible environment and battles enemies approaching from the bottom of the screen. The player can use two weapons, a melee attack, and an "ultimate" ability that requires the prior defeat of several enemies.

I Hate Running Backwards was born out of a mobile driving game presented to and reworked in cooperation with Croteam. As part of the Croteam Incubator programme, it was moved to the Serious Sam franchise and renamed Serious Sam: I Hate Running Backwards, later I Hate Running Backwards. A publishing deal with Devolver Digital was reached in 2017, and the game was released for the PlayStation 4, Windows, and the Xbox One in May 2018 as the first Croteam Incubator game. The release was followed by a Linux version in June 2018 and a Nintendo Switch port that October.

I Hate Running Backwards was met with a mixed reception. The game's control interface and arsenal were well received, while the visual style and character unlock system raised conflicting opinions. The game's slow pace, repetitiveness, and inconsistencies in difficulty between runs were criticised, although some of these issues were resolved through later patches.

== Gameplay ==
Crystal's ultimate ability deflects projectiles.

I Hate Running Backwards is a shoot 'em up game and a spin-off in the Serious Sam series. The screen continuously scrolls vertically, as the player character runs backwards towards the top of the screen. They traverse procedurally generated levels across five thematic environments, occasionally using vehicles. The player can freely move the character on the screen and shoot downwards with a fixed aim.

The character wields two ranged weapons that are fired individually. Running out of ammunition for the primary weapon reverts it to a pistol with unlimited ammunition. Further weapons and special abilities can be obtained through collectables. Using a melee attack, the character can deflect enemy projectiles and kill nearby enemies. This attack can be used again after a cooldown. A special attack, the "ultimate" ability, requires filling a meter by killing enemies. Enemies approach from the bottom of the screen. A boss appears at the end of each environment, of which the final one, Ugh-Zan, has two phases. Defeating a boss unlocks a shortcut to the next level that can be accessed at the start of a run. After each boss and before the start of a run, the initial weapon loadout can be chosen, with later selection stages providing stronger weapons. Parts of the environment are destructible.

The player chooses from one of several characters, some of whom are taken from the Serious Sam, Broforce, Hotline Miami, Enter the Gungeon, Nuclear Throne, and Shadow Warrior franchises, including Serious Sam's protagonist, Sam "Serious" Stone. The initial roster consists of three characters, while further characters are unlocked through in-game progress. All characters have varying weapon loadouts, health, and speed. I Hate Running Backwards can be played cooperatively with a second local player. In this mode, more enemies spawn and bosses have more health. If either player character dies, they respawn after 30 seconds if the other stays alive.

== Development and release ==
I Hate Running Backwards was developed by Binx Interactive, a Zagreb-based indie game studio founded in 2014 by Bernard Bachrach, Nikola Đurinec, Filip Kovač, Adam Mehtić, Denis Mraović, and Matko Šimecki. At the company's inception, its employees had little knowledge of game development and no funding, and many worked second jobs at other local developers and provided quality assurance to other studios, which often led to 15-hour workdays. Binx Interactive initially created mobile games, some of which were cancelled due to a lack of resources. The studio's debut game was Monster Loops, which it co-developed with the Serbian studio Mad Head Games for iOS.

In 2016, Binx Interactive travelled to the Reboot Develop conference in Split to exhibit Monster Loops. Some members of the studio approached Damjan Mravunac, the composer from Croteam, with a prototype of a mobile driving game. This prototype, created by two Binx Interactive employees in their free time, involved tapping the touchscreen to make a car turn, drift, and spin. Mravunac suggested several changes, which the team delivered three days later. Stemming from this encounter, Binx Interactive and Croteam communicated weekly and, after approximately a month, Croteam suggested that Binx Interactive build a game in the Serious Sam universe. Within a month, the team reworked the game with elements from the Serious Sam franchise and presented a prototype to Croteam, which greenlit the project. By November 2017, Binx Interactive consisted of six full-time employees and one part-time worker. Of the founders, Bachrach acted as the chief executive officer (CEO), Kovač as a visual effects artist and designer, Šimecki as a 2D/3D artist and designer, Đurinec as a programmer, and Mraović as a programmer and the co-CEO. Luka Mihaldinec, who joined the studio after its formation, created promotional videos and maintained the game's forums and social media channels. The team used the Unity game engine for I Hate Running Backwards.

In 2017, Croteam arranged a publishing deal for the game with Devolver Digital, which had published several of Croteam's previous games, including Serious Sam titles. This partnership was announced with a trailer in August that year. Around this time, the project was named Serious Sam: I Hate Running Backwards, later shortened to I Hate Running Backwards. The name was taken from a quote issued by Sam "Serious" Stone after travelling long distances in reverse. Croteam and Devolver Digital allowed Binx Interactive creative control in the development, only occasionally providing advice. In March 2018, Croteam announced that its business incubator programme would be known as Croteam Incubator, with I Hate Running Backwards as the first release under that banner. A trailer announcing the release date was published in May 2018.

The game was released for Windows, PlayStation 4, and Xbox One on 22 May 2018. A Linux version was postponed for additional testing before being released on 28 June 2018. A port for Nintendo Switch was initially scheduled for "late summer" 2018 and was released on 19 October. The developers also considered bringing the game to iOS. Following the initial release, Binx Interactive released multiple patches for I Hate Running Backwards. In February 2019, the team stated that development had concluded so Binx Interactive could focus on future projects.

== Reception ==
Reception

Aggregate score
Aggregator	Score
Metacritic	PC: 71/100; PS4: 63/100; XONE: 65/100

Review scores
Publication	Score
Destructoid	5/10
Nintendo World Report	6/10
PC PowerPlay	8/10
IGN España	6.5/10

I Hate Running Backwards was named among the best games exhibited at the PAX East trade show by GamesRadar+ in April 2018, a month before the game's release. Upon release, the game received "mixed or average reviews", according to the review aggregator website Metacritic, which calculated weighted average ratings of 71/100 for personal computers, 63/100 for the PlayStation 4, and 65/100 for the Xbox One.

Robert Purchese of Eurogamer described the game as a "fun and fast" arcade game, akin to his experience with Broforce. Peter Glagowski of Destructoid commended the simple control interface and fixed line of fire, which he found made the game more navigable. However, he and Julia Gomez of Nintendo World Report faulted the procedural generation, including inconsistent placements of collectables and enemies, for causing difficulty imbalances between runs. Furthermore, Glagowski lamented that the progress required to unlock characters was unclear. In contrast, Gomez considered them a good reward system. Discussing the weaponry, Ángel Llamas of IGN's Spanish outlet highlighted the expansiveness of the available arsenal, while Purchese labelled the individual weapons as "imaginative".

Purchese enjoyed the game's bright visual style. David Hollingworth of PC PowerPlay echoed this sentiment, calling it chaotic in "all the best ways". Llamas similarly perceived the visuals as chaotic when there were many enemies on-screen. Critics raised mixed opinions regarding the game's pacing. While Hollingworth and Gomez lauded the ease of repeatedly commencing a run in the game, Llamas considered the game repetitive in longer sessions and regarded it better suited for mobile platforms. Glagowski deemed the game's slow pace its biggest problem and criticised that the shortcuts were not saved between restarts of the game. He later said that several of his complaints, in particular those regarding the pace and shortcuts, were resolved by a patch.
