= Gods Will Be Watching =

2014 video game

- Developer: Deconstructeam
- Publisher: Devolver Digital
- Director: Jordi de Paco
- Designer: Jordi de Paco
- Programmer: Jordi de Paco
- Artist: Jonathan Romero
- Writer: Jordi de Paco
- Composer: Paula "Fingerspit" Ruiz
- Engine: GameMaker: Studio
- Platforms: Windows, OS X, Linux, iOS, Android
- Release: Windows, OS X, Linux; 24 July 2014 iOS; 17 December 2015; Android; TBA
- Genre: Graphic adventure
- Mode: Single-player

Gods Will Be Watching is a point-and-click adventure video game created by Spain-based development studio Deconstructeam and published by Devolver Digital, released on 24 July 2014. Described as a "point-and-click thriller", the game revolves around a core mechanic of resource and time management, in which the player is placed in various scenarios and tasked to avert a crisis. The iOS port of Gods Will Be Watching was released on 17 December 2015.

== Gameplay ==
Gods Will Be Watching is a point-and-click adventure game with emphasis on the player's decision making. It features six chapters, each of which acts as a resource and time management puzzle. The player's goal in each chapter is to lead a group of characters through various circumstances in a fixed amount of time, often having to make moral decisions. The player can click on the ground to move, and on other characters to speak with them and give them orders. Options given to the player include, for example, choosing to kill a group member in order to reserve rations for the rest of the group.

== Plot ==
The game is set in a far future science fiction setting, playing in 2257 CFD (Constellar Federation Date), with the player assuming the role of an agent of the neutral organization known as Everdusk Company for the Universe Knowledge (E.C.U.K.), Sgt. Burden. Burden and his right-hand man, Corporal Jack Maslow, are veterans of the Constellar Federation's army. They have embedded themselves and gained the trust of Xenolifer, an armed movement fighting for the rights of alien species, which the Constellar Federation enslaves. Xenolifer is led by the idealistic, charismatic, and good-intentioned yet flawed and extremist Liam Feronh-Gau.

=== Chapter 1: Self-Justified Sacrifices ===
A four-man team of Xenolifer agents — consisting of Burden, Jack, Liam's trusted technician Shaman, and Liam himself — raid a Hollistic Empire lab for research on the Medusea Virus, which Xenolifer intends to weaponize and use as a bargaining chip against the Federation. Having taken the research team hostage to force a standoff with the security forces, Xenolifer successfully steals the data, but the security forces breach the lab, capturing Burden and Jack. Liam and Shaman escape, with Liam promising he will return to save the two.

=== Chapter 2: 20 Days of Empty Words ===
Three days before the raid on the lab, Burden contacts E.C.U.K. headquarters, who order him to assassinate Liam to stop the Medusea Virus from falling into Xenolifer's hands. Abraham refuses, stating that he believes he can push Liam onto a more peaceful path.

After being captured, Burden and Jack are interrogated by the Hollistic Empire's sadistic torturers, Irving and Alexander. After two days of torture, Liam infiltrates the prison the two are held in. However, the prison is too heavily guarded for a prison break executed by just Liam. Xenolifer is preparing a rescue operation, but the two must endure another twenty days of torture. However, Liam will visit the two every night with stolen medicine, painkillers, or intel to effectively give false information. In one of the torture sessions, Jack can permanently lose his arm. On the ninth day, E.C.U.K. soldiers launch a surprise assault on the prison to rescue Burden and Jack, but Liam, who was visiting at the time, is incapacitated by breaching charges and is left behind.

=== Chapter 3: Everdusk ===
After being rescued, Burden and Jack recover from their wounds, with Jack gaining a prosthetic hand for the rest of the game if he lost it in the previous chapter. As Xenolifer now has the ability to deploy the Medusea Virus at any time. Burden and Jack are assigned as security for a team researching an antidote for the virus on the planet of Sineicos, where the virus originates from. The team consists of psychiatrist Sarah Gaynor, her husband and roboticist Donald Gaynor, bacteriologist Paul Zenész, Donald's sentient android Br4n-Don, and Jack's dog Marvin.

However, Liam, having escaped from the Empire himself, confronts the team, exposes them to the virus, and traps them in their research lab by blowing up the entrance; he intends them to work quickly for the antidote, which Xenolifer is hoping to obtain as soon as possible. The team are forced to perform potentially deadly human experimentation on themselves in order to synthesize the cure, while managing their electricity supply, digging a way out of the cave before suffocating, and combating the virus' paralyzing effects. They eventually escape and Liam takes the cure, but he blows up the E.C.U.K. team's spaceship to prevent them from escaping and warning E.C.U.K. or the Constellar Federation.

=== Chapter 4: Gods Will Be Watching ===
The team struggle to survive on Sineicos with minimal food and no shelter. Additionally, there are only five hours in every day, heavily limiting the team's ability to act. The team has a radio which can signal to a crossing convoy to help, but it is heavily damaged and must be repaired by the twenty-third day, otherwise the team will be isolated for another fourteen months. However, the team is able to survive and are saved by a ship passing by.

=== Chapter 5: Legend ===
After being rescued once again, E.C.U.K. briefs the team on what has transpired since their isolation. Xenolifer has made demands to the Federation to abolish alien slavery, otherwise they will unleash their modified, encrpyted strain of the virus onto Gactus VII, a planet with one of the highest populations of alien slaves. As the virus only works on mammals and thus humans, their goal is to create a planet where only aliens will be able to live there and be free. However, four billion human lives will potentially be at risk. Burden volunteers for a solo suicide mission, with Br4n-D0n's being disassembled for him to join Burden and provide assistance.

== Development ==
Gods Will Be Watching was originally developed as an entry for the Ludum Dare game jam #26, the theme being minimalism. The original version was created across a span of 72 hours and featured a single scenario, akin to a chapter in the final game. It ranked second place in the competition, losing to Leaf Me Alone by Mark Foster and David Fenn.

After the development competition, Deconstructeam launched a crowdfunding campaign on Indiegogo for the development of a full game, with a goal of €8,000. The campaign ended on 15 August 2013, having raised €20,385, or $21,242 in U.S. dollars. The game was released worldwide on 24 July 2014, for Microsoft Windows, OS X, and Linux.

An epilogue was added to the game as a free download in May 2015.

As the game was already announced for a release on iOS and Android, Abstraction Games took on the development of the game's mobile versions, where the Android release date is still to be announced.

== Reception ==
Reception

Aggregate score
Aggregator	Score
Metacritic	64/100

Review scores
Publication	Score
Destructoid	8.5/10
Eurogamer	5/10
GameSpot	6/10
GameTrailers	5/10
Gamezebo	2.5/5
GameZone	7/10
IGN	8/10
Joystiq	3.5/5
PC Gamer (UK)	81%
Shacknews	7/10
USgamer	3/5
The Digital Fix	8/10
Digital Spy	2/5

The PC version received "mixed" reviews according to the review aggregation website Metacritic. Critics praised it for its minimalist pixel art style, interesting story, and novel take on adventure games, but criticism was levied for its repetitiveness, tediousness, and excessive challenge. The primary concern of reviewers was the trial and error nature of the gameplay and the lack of checkpoints, requiring multiple, time-consuming attempts at single scenarios.

Rowan Kaiser of IGN praised the game's simplicity and tense story, calling it "a demonstration that even with the simplest of interfaces and old-fashioned graphics, new combinations of storytelling with gameplay are possible."
