= Heave Ho =

2019 video game

- Developer: Le Cartel Studio
- Publisher: Devolver Digital
- Engine: Unity
- Platforms: Windows; macOS; Nintendo Switch; Amazon Luna
- Release: Windows, macOS, Switch; August 29, 2019; Amazon Luna; February 3, 2022
- Genres: Party, platform
- Modes: Single-player, multiplayer

Heave Ho is a platform party video game developed by Le Cartel Studio and published by Devolver Digital. In Heave Ho, players must navigate their characters through a ravine across a series of increasingly complex levels in order to reach the end goal. The game's physics system allows players to launch their characters to safety through stretching movements and interactions with other player characters. Heave Ho was released worldwide for Microsoft Windows, macOS, and Nintendo Switch on August 29, 2019, to a generally positive critical reception, with many critics praising it as an exemplary cooperative video game. A version for Amazon Luna was made available on February 3, 2022.

== Gameplay ==
In Heave Ho, players assume control of colourful characters, each presented as disembodied heads with a pair of stretchable arms, that must grapple and swing across each level in order to progress. In the event that a player character falls out of the level's boundaries, it respawns at the start of the level for a fresh attempt. Players can only control their respective character's arms; on a game controller, this is accomplished by moving the analogue stick. Characters may be customized with a variety of accessories and skins. Each skin may be unlocked with coins found throughout the levels, which players must deliver to the goal in order to get credit. In multiplayer scenarios, player characters may work together in order to progress, such as grabbing one another's hands, climbing across another character's dangling body, and/or swinging another character across distances.

== Development and release ==
Heave Ho is developed by Le Cartel Studio, an independent development studio based in France, and published by Devolver Digital. The concept behind Heave Ho originated from a game jam organized by Est Ensemble, MediaLab 93 and The Beautiful Games, which had the overarching theme of with the theme of urban culture. The character designs of Heave Ho were by artist Alexandre Muttoni and designer Frédéric Coispeau, who came up with "street workout" as their own sub-theme for the game jam: it involved a workout using only both arms without touching the ground.

A game demo for Heave Ho was released on Steam a month before the game's launch on August 29, 2019, for PC and Nintendo Switch. The team planned to have 50 different skins for the game's launch.

== Reception ==
Reception

Aggregate score
Aggregator	Score
Metacritic	PC: 76/100; NS: 80/100

Review scores
Publication	Score
Destructoid	8/10
Hardcore Gamer	4/5
Nintendo Life	8/10
Nintendo World Report	9/10
Cubed3	8/10
Screen Rant	4/5

According to review aggregator Metacritic, both PC and Nintendo Switch versions of Heave Ho has received generally favorable reviews. Joe DeVader from Nintendo World Report called it a "perfect" local multiplayer game for social occasions, praising its accessible control scheme and infectious humour. Josh Di Falco praised the mechanic of flinging other characters across the stage, occasionally to land in a pit of spikes, as good fun. He agreed that Heave Ho is a superior multiplayer experience compared to its single-player mode, ideally for a group of people that have a sense of humour, and that it holds up well against better known titles in the party game genre. Patrick Hancock considered Heave Ho to be an excellent multiplayer title and good value for money with the amount of content that players can access, but agreed that it is a "much harder sale" for players looking to play solo. Ollie Reynolds from Nintendo Life called it one of the best couch co-op titles available on the Nintendo Switch as it encourages communication and careful planning, yet retains an "utterly chaotic and achingly hilarious" spirit. He also praised the selection of unique costumes to unlock, but was somewhat disappointed by the lack of differentiation between single-player and multiplayer versions of the game's levels.
