= Omnibus progression =

Chord progression

The omnibus progression (or wedge progression) is a series of musical chords characterized by chromatic lines moving in opposite directions. It was first described by nineteenth-century Viennese music theorists. It has been described as "one of music's great wonders".

The name was coined by Bernhard Ziehn. The basic device is a popular compositional exercise used by teachers like Wolfgang Amadeus Mozart, who assigned it to Thomas Attwood. Nadia Boulanger also taught with it. The pattern facilitates modulation to any key and can be halted at any point. It is also known as a "wedge progression", due to its appearance.

The progression developed atop the descending chromatic bass line which was a common feature in Baroque forms like the passacaglia and lament arias. The chromatic notes pose several harmonization problems. The omnibus progression codifies the Baroque harmonic solutions for this bass line.

The upper voice moves in the opposite direction from the dominant note up to the tonic. The middle voices prolong the dominant tonality.

The basic omnibus progression can be found in Franz Schubert's Piano Sonata in A minor, D 845. As the composer transitions from the opening movement's first theme to its second, he begins on a G chord in first inversion. The B in the bass line meanders chromatically down to an F♯ in Schubert's version of the progression:

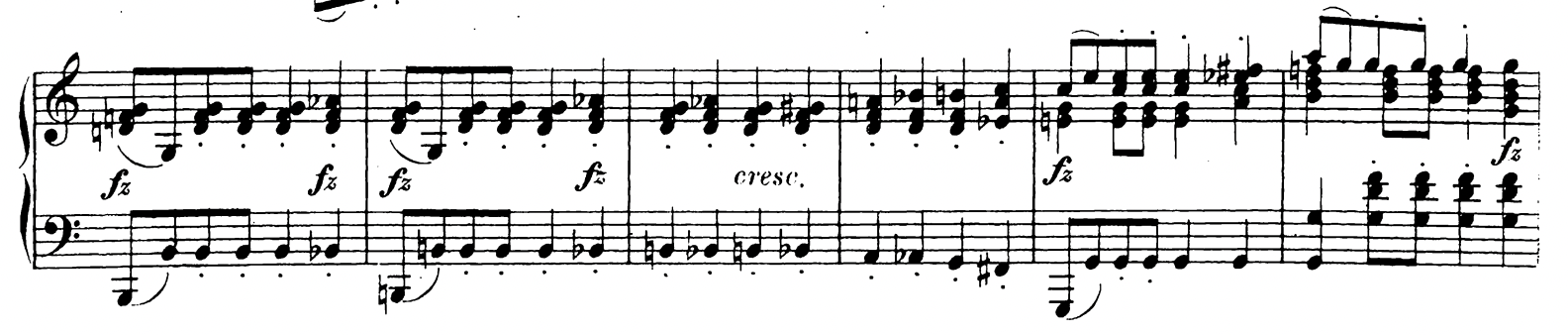
Omnibus progression in Franz Schubert's ''Piano Sonata in A Minor, D 845'', Moderato.

In its fullest form, the bass descends the entire octave. It may also include chromatic ascending tetrachords in the other parts.

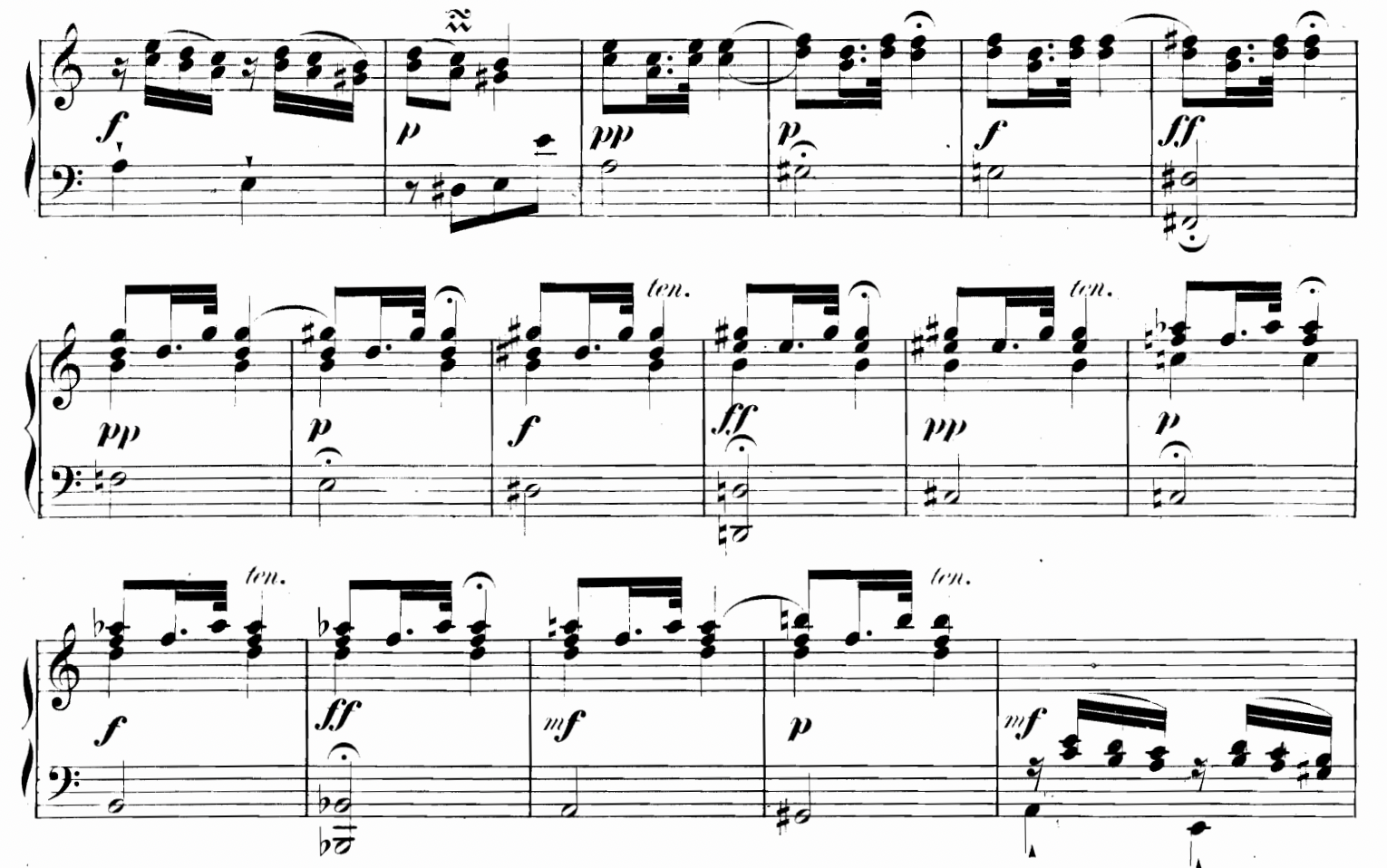
Omnibus progression in Carl Philipp Emanuel Bach's ''Rondo in A minor'' (mm. 136-156).

A full octave descent in an omnibus progression is evident in Carl Philipp Emanuel Bach's Rondo, No. 3 in A Minor W56/5. It demonstrates the contrapuntal approach to the progression, which prioritizes voice leading. Focusing too much on a harmonic solution can lead to an incoherent sequence of chords, which is why the omnibus progression made such an attractive composition assignment.

Richard Wagner made extensive use of the progression as he stretched tonality in Tristan und Isolde. He also used it extensively as a characterization for Kundry in Parsifal. Russian composers were also prone to use the device. Pyotr Ilyich Tchaikovsky uses it in many of his compositions. When the Christmas tree in The Nutcracker grows to a gigantic size, Tchaikovsky uses a wedge progression to move the music from E minor to B♭.
