= Exit the Gungeon =

2019 video game

- Developers: Dodge Roll; Singlecore Games
- Publisher: Devolver Digital
- Platforms: Windows; macOS; iOS; Switch; PlayStation 4; Xbox One
- Release: iOS (Apple Arcade); September 19, 2019; Mac, Windows, Switch; March 17, 2020; PS4, Xbox One; November 13, 2020; Android, iOS; August 14, 2025
- Genres: Bullet hell, platform
- Mode: Single-player

Exit the Gungeon is a 2019 bullet hell platform game co-developed by Dodge Roll and Singlecore Games and published by Devolver Digital. It was released for iOS through Apple Arcade on September 19, 2019, for macOS, Windows, and Nintendo Switch on March 17, 2020, and for PlayStation 4 and Xbox One on November 13, 2020. A separate iOS release and an Android version were launched on August 14, 2025. A spin-off to Enter the Gungeon, players take control of one of four playable characters as they attempt to escape the collapsing Gungeon. The game received mixed reviews on release.

== Gameplay ==
Exit The Gungeon is a 2D bullet hell platform game. Players control one of four characters, called the Gungeoneers, which must escape the crumbling Gungeon. The Gungeoneers each have their own unique set of levels, and travel aboard an elevator, where they are attacked by gun-themed enemies that spawn around them. Players defeat enemies using a gun that randomly transforms over time due to a "blessing". Each time the player kills an enemy in succession without taking damage, the greater the chance that the next time their gun transforms, it will be into a more powerful shape. More types of gun transformations can be unlocked by defeating boss enemies, which give the player an in-game currency called Hegemony Credits that can be spent to unlock the new guns. Once unlocked, the gun may be randomly transformed into the new shape. The player can transverse levels and dodge enemy attacks by dodge rolling or jumping, which allows them to be immune to losing hit points while airborne.

As a roguelike game, players are sent back to a safe area called the Underbreach every time they die. There, they can switch between Gungeoneers, talk to non-player characters, or use Hegemony Credits to buy guns and items that may be randomly encountered while playing.

== Reception ==
Reception

Aggregate scores
Aggregator	Score
Metacritic	(NS) 69/100
OpenCritic	45% recommend

Review scores
Publication	Score
Destructoid	7/10
IGN	7/10
Nintendo Life	7/10
Nintendo World Report	6.5/10
Shacknews	7/10

Exit the Gungeon received "mixed or average reviews" for its Nintendo Switch version according to the review aggregator website Metacritic. OpenCritic assessed that the game received fair approval, being recommended by 45% of critics. Nic Vargus of IGN disliked the constant swapping of guns, but said that the chaotic nature of each play through made the game fun. Jon Mundy of Nintendo Life rated the game a 7/10, saying it was a challenging action-platformer but lacked the "freewheeling imagination and tantalising sense of adventure" of Enter the Gungeon. Shacknews noted that the game was shorter than its predecessor and had less exploration, but considered it comparable in terms of combat difficulty and praised the arcade-style gameplay.
