= Ronin (video game) =

2015 video game

- Logo of Ronin
- Developer: Tomasz Wacławek
- Publisher: Devolver Digital
- Designer: Tomasz Wacławek
- Programmer: Tomasz Wacławek
- Artist: Łukasz Piskorz
- Writer: Tomasz Wacławek
- Composer: Patryk Karwat
- Engine: GameMaker: Studio
- Platforms: Microsoft Windows, OS X, Linux, PlayStation 4
- Release: Microsoft Windows; 30 June 2015; OS X, Linux; 15 October 2015; PlayStation 4; 1 November 2016
- Genres: Action, platform
- Mode: Single-player

Ronin is a turn-based action platform video game developed by indie developer Tomasz Wacławek and published by Devolver Digital. It was released for Microsoft Windows on 27 May 2015 into Steam Early Access and left it on 30 June 2015. A later update for the game introduced builds for OS X and Linux on 15 October 2015. A PlayStation 4 port of Ronin was released on 1 November 2016.

== Gameplay ==
Ronin has a stealth-based business complex level design, which the designer Tomasz Wacławek described as a rip-off from Tom Francis' Gunpoint. The player needs to avoid being seen by the guards and use the surprise moment for silent kills. Once in a fight situation, the player has to dodge the guards' attacks and get the right angle to defeat them. The player can also throw their sword at enemies.

The player can hang from the ceiling in a level. This allows them to attack guards without being seen. The guard must be directly under the player and they must not be an elite guard. This attack kills the guard instantly.

Wall climbing is also a mechanic in the game. The player can slide down walls, stick to them, and launch themselves off the wall toward a guard. This also allows the player to reach the ceiling or another area. This gives surprise moments for silent kills.

== Plot ==
The story follows the titular protagonist of the game, a young woman seeking to find and enact revenge on five individuals she blames for her father's death, marked and crossed out one by one throughout the game on a polaroid group photo, including her father, the five responsible for his death, and her at a young age, years before the events of the game.

The game ends after killing the last target, the Boss, and depending on if you were hit or not results in, respectively: The bad ending & death, or the good ending.

The prequel comic confirms she is the young blonde girl in the polaroid, and reveals she enjoys the rush of killing and has never felt more alive during it.

== Development and release ==
Ronin developed by Polish developer Tomasz Wacławek, a designer at Flying Wild Hog. Ronin was originally created for the itch.io "Cyberpunk" Game Jam, it was submitted under the user name teedoubleu in March 2014. Although it didn't get any high ratings, the highest being place #88 in the category "Relevance", it won the Developer's Showcase and Jury Award at the World of Gamedev Knowledge Conference 2014 (WGK) in Gdańsk, Poland. After having gained a new artist, Łukasz Piskorz, the game's graphics were polished up from pixel art to high-quality 2D art. This change was done not only to make it look better, but also to distinguish it from Gunpoint. Piotr Iwanicki, creative director of Superhot and part of the WGK award jury, gave Wacławek then the idea of handing Ronin over to Devolver Digital, and so he did. Their first public collaborative announcement was the release of Ronin's reveal trailer.

After a longer silent development phase, Wacławek released an updated version of the original Ronin game jam entry, using the new graphics, soundtrack and functions of the full game, to its itch.io page on 20 April 2015, therefore recalling the page from "RONIN" to "RONIN Demo". The game was initially released onto Steam Early Access on 24 May 2015 for Microsoft Windows, OS X and Linux, however, the OS X and Linux versions were taken down due to their instability. The game left Early Access on 30 June 2015 for Microsoft Windows only. On 18 June 2015, it was announced that Ronin would be ported to PlayStation 4 and PlayStation Vita. On 15 October 2015, update #9 for the game introduced builds for OS X and Linux. On 1 November 2016, the port of Ronin for PlayStation 4 was released.

There's a 25-page digital comic book and original soundtrack published within Special Edition of the game.

== Reception ==
Reception

Aggregate score
Aggregator	Score
Metacritic	(PS4) 71/100 (PC) 70/100

Review scores
Publication	Score
4Players	(PS4) 67% (PC) 63%
Destructoid	(PC) 4.5/10
Game Informer	(PC) 7.75/10
GameSpot	(PC) 7/10
GamesTM	(PC) 6/10
GameZone	(PC) 8.5/10
Jeuxvideo.com	(PC) 16/20
PC Gamer (UK)	(PC) 74%
PC PowerPlay	(PC) 8/10
Shacknews	(PC) 7/10
The Escapist	(PC) 2/5
National Post	(PC) 6.5/10

The PC and PlayStation 4 versions received "mixed or average reviews" according to the review aggregation website Metacritic. Reviewers praised the PC version's overall design concept and the alikeness with Gunpoint. Though, people still differentiated them, where Phil Savage of PC Gamer stated that Ronin is "the schlocky B-movie to Gunpoint's more cerebral stealth-puzzling". Something that was not as well received was the repetitiveness of some levels, as Matt Porter of Hooked Gamers wrote: "Each of the five people you have to kill are in the same type of boring office building." Ronin's lowest review rating was given by Steven Bogos of The Escapist, who said, "Ronin is a remarkably average game. When it works, it's kind of fun, but there just isn't enough here to maintain interest, and it has nothing that we haven't seen before."
