= Omnibus (painting) =

1891–1892 painting by Anders Zorn

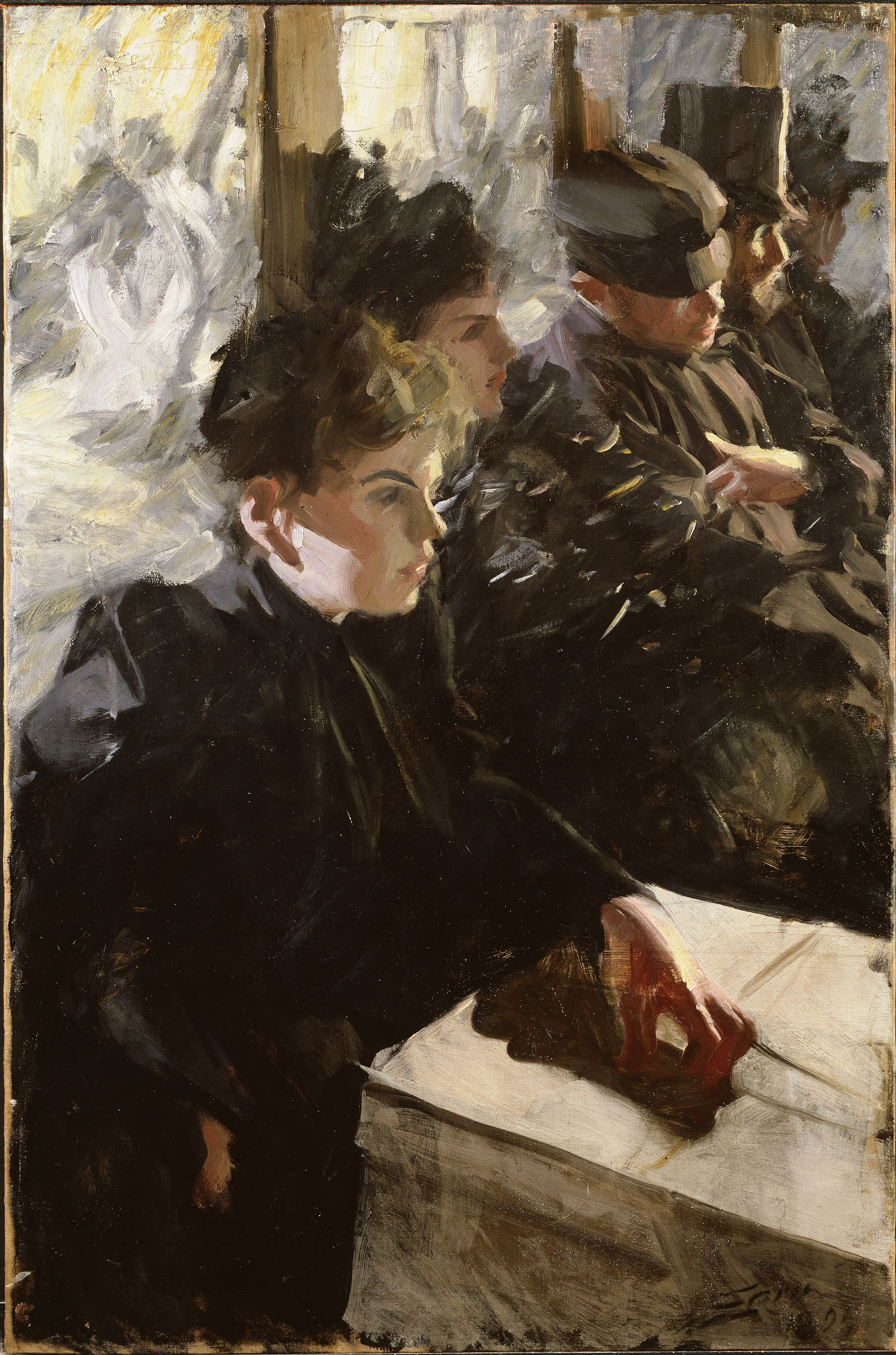
- Artist: Anders Zorn
- Year: 1891–1892
- Medium: Oil on canvas
- Dimensions: 99.5 cm × 66 cm (39.2 in × 26 in)
- Location: Nationalmuseum; Stockholm

Omnibus is an oil-on-canvas painting created during 1891–92 by the Swedish artist Anders Zorn. There are two versions of the painting – the first one is exhibited at Nationalmuseum in Stockholm and the second in Isabella Stewart Gardner Museum in Boston.

Omnibus is an impressionist painting representing contemporary urban life in Paris. It depicts 4-5 people sitting in a public trolley. In the foreground there is a young woman with a square box. Behind her, a prostitute can be seen. Both women represent the modern life with its commercial attractions and dangers.
