= Noct (video game) =

- Developer: C3SK
- Publisher: Devolver Digital
- Designer: Chris Eskins
- Programmers: Chris Eskins; Mark Chong
- Artist: Chris Eskins
- Composers: Robin Finck; Pedro "Word Clock" Pimentel
- Engine: Unity
- Platforms: Linux, macOS, Windows
- Release: 21 October 2015 (early access)
- Genres: Survival horror, top-down shooter
- Modes: Single-player, multiplayer

Noct is an unfinished survival horror top-down shooter video game by Canada-based indie developer C3SK (Chris Eskins) and published by Devolver Digital. The game was released in early access for Linux, macOS, and Windows in October 2015. It was delisted from the Steam store in 2021.

== Plot ==
Noct plays in a post-apocalyptic world, in which the Earth has become a ruined wasteland. Filled with darkness, it is now known as the Noct. An ancient evil, called the Nocturnal, has spread over the Earth's surface, devouring the human population and leaving the survivors of that purge at distress. One unnamed survivor is now set to uncover the origins of alien-like creatures and fight their way through to put an end to the unhuman rulership. To get there, the survivor has to make themselves up to seek for weaponry, food and water to stay alive and be prepared to encounter and fight against the Nocturnal, ultimately surviving in a decaying world.

== Gameplay ==
In Noct, the protagonist, an unnamed survivor, can be seen through a thermal imaging satellite, and can only be controlled from that perspective. As the player moves the character through the wasteland, they will receive messages from the overwatch, who are responsible for the active satellite, which give the player certain quests to perform to track down the Nocturnal's origin. In a total of four acts, the player is set to complete these quests as a primary objective, while they also have to find food, water and weaponry, which were hidden inside buildings during the invasion. All weapons in the game only feature a minimal magazine, while the player is also not able to carry more than three external magazines to reload the weapon. If the player ever runs out ammo, they have to rely on melee combat until they find another weapon or ammo crate. At random times, the player encounters one of the Nocturnal monsters, foreshadowing it with the protagonist releasing a slight "uh oh!" upon them coming nearer. In case the player is inside a building, they are unable to see anything outside the room they are standing in. The only thing visible for the player are the doors of that building, which open and close if a Nocturnal enters one, so that the player can evaluate if it is safe to leave the room they are in. Once the player dies, you can see the overwatch switch to a new survivor, leading him to the previous survivor's corpse to retrieve the items already gathered and continue their quest. In online multiplayer, the player eventually meets up with others, and they have to decide quick if they are working together or try to murder each other to gain each other's weapons and ammo.

== Development ==
Noct was crowdfunded through the website Kickstarter, where developer Chris Eskins sought to raise CA$22,000, starting in August 2014. The game was successfully funded on 19 September 2014 and finally ended on 24 September 2014 with a total of CA$36,363 pledged. Noct was greenlit for release on the platform Steam through its Steam Greenlight on 26 September 2014. A prototype of the game was playable at PAX South 2015. In September 2015, it was announced that Noct would be released on 22 October that year. Noct was released on 21 October into Steam's early access programme, with a full release initially planned for January 2016.

The game remains in development and Mark Chong streams the process live via his Twitch channel. In August 2022, he stated that his idea to rewrite the game's inventory system and subsequent scope expansion caused the production to be slowed down significantly; he believed that, without his input, Eskins would have finished and released a smaller-scope game much earlier.
