= Starseeker: Astroneer Expeditions =

2026 video game by System Era Softworks

- Cover art
- Developer: System Era Softworks
- Publisher: Devolver Digital
- Director: Adam Bromell
- Producer: Veronica Peshterianu
- Engine: Unreal Engine 5
- Platforms: Windows; Nintendo Switch 2; PlayStation 5; Xbox Series X/S
- Release: June 11, 2026 (early access)
- Genre: Action-adventure
- Mode: Multiplayer

Starseeker: Astroneer Expeditions is an action-adventure developed by American studio System Era Softworks and published by Devolver Digital. A spin-off of the 2019 sandbox game Astroneer, Starseeker was released in early access for Microsoft Windows, Xbox Series X/S, Nintendo Switch 2, and PlayStation 5 on June 11, 2026.

Unlike the original Astroneer, which focused heavily on sandbox survival and base-building, Starseeker tasks the player with joining cooperative expeditions to complete planet-wide objectives. Players take part in these expeditions across hazardous planets while gathering resources, surviving environmental dangers and completing shared objectives.

== Gameplay ==
Starseeker is an action adventure game played from a third-person perspective. The game centers around cooperative multiplayer gameplay, with players forming "squads" of up to four players to explore planets and complete objectives.

=== ESS Starseeker ===
Players travel between planets using a space station hub, the ESS Starseeker, that acts as a central gathering area for players to prepare before venturing to a planet. Expeditions involve collecting resources, navigating vast planets, avoiding hazards and completing mission objectives. Gathered resources can be taken back to the space station to craft and prepare for the next expedition.

Several NPCs form the ship’s crew. Many are unnamed ensigns. However, among the named NPCs are Captain Jupiter, Ensign Muriel, Science Officer Jessandra, and a robot named JAM-BX. Each named NPC provides important storyline quests.

=== Tephra ===
Tephra is currently the first and only planet to exist in the game. It features five large landmasses surrounded by vast oceans. Each landmass has a variety of resources, structures, flora, and fauna. Fauna are frequently aggressive and attack the player upon being approached. Landing pads are scattered around, providing a place to both arrive at and depart the planet.

=== Mechanics ===
The game retains several Astroneer mechanics, such as terrain deformation, oxygen management and customizable tool loadouts. However, Starseeker adapts these mechanics to better fit the game's extraction-style mechanics, including oxygen functioning as a way to force the player to extract from the planet.

Players can customize equipment loadouts and unlock new tools and upgrades through mission rewards and questlines. The game also contains live-service elements, introducing new objectives over time.

== Plot ==
While not a true sequel, Starseeker takes place in the same universe as and follows directly from Astroneer's plot.

== Development and release ==
The game was announced in April 2025 by System Era Softworks. A demo of the game was available at PAX West 2025. The game was released into early access on June 11, 2026 following a series of both public and private tests. System Era stated that the early access period is estimated to last for around one year.
