= Shroom and Gloom =

Upcoming video game from Devolver Digital

- Developer: Team Lazerbeam
- Publisher: Devolver Digital
- Engine: Unity
- Platforms: macOS; Windows
- Genres: First-person shooter, roguelike, Double-deckbuilder
- Mode: Single-player

Shroom and Gloom is an upcoming roguelike deckbuilder video game developed by Team Lazerbeam and published by Devolver Digital. A demo was released on Steam in May 2025.

== Gameplay ==
Shroom and Gloom is a first-person, roguelike deckbuilder. Players navigate the fungal dungeons using standard movement controls, interacting with points of interest and uncovering hidden secrets. The combat deck allows players to employ various attacks, such as stabbing, seasoning, skewering, roasting, and eating enemies. Additionally, players can combine multiple foes into a single pot to create a powerful soup. The non-combat deck, composed of Explore cards, functions as tools, including maps, lockpicks, and campfires.

== Development ==
Developer Team Lazerbeam is based in Cape Town, South Africa. Shroom and Gloom originated as a game jam. Originally, there would be a third deck gained from collecting treasure, but this was cut due to time constraints that came with the game jam. Conventionally, there would be a card-based combat and an exploration phase. But a primary idea was a subversion of this formula where all decisions made were card driven, which was the idea for the second deck came up, even prior to the coding phase.

It was believed that audio was "central to the experience". Music was composed in a way that "[didn't] feel overly taxing to the player, but something to still provide those feelings of dread, mystery, and wonder, but do it in a sparse, ambient way" and felt unique to players experiencing the game.

== Release ==
The game began as a prototype developed by Team Lazerbeam during a 7 Day FPS game jam in 2021. Following further development, a new prototype was released on itch.io in September 2024 to gauge interest and explore the game's potential for a full version.

In May 2025, Devolver Digital was announced as the game's publisher, and the project was promoted to a playable demo, which launched on Steam. While an exact release date is not yet available, Shroom and Gloom is currently planned to enter Early Access later in 2025. A free playable demo was made available on Steam in May 2025.

== Reception ==
Its combat came very close to re-inventing the roguelike deckbuilder genre according to Inverse. Rock Paper Shotgun concurred that the game indeed had a unique atmosphere. PC Gamer stated the demo was "a lot of fun and I'm eager to play through it again". Destructoid claimed it was "definitely worth playing if you're a fan of indies, deckbuilders, or unique titles in general."
