= A Fistful of Gun =

2015 video game

- Developer: FarmerGnome
- Publisher: Devolver Digital
- Designer: Paul Hart
- Artist: Paul Hart
- Writer: Lee Williams
- Composer: Surasshu
- Platform: Windows
- Release: 24 September 2015
- Genre: Top-down shooter
- Modes: Single-player, multiplayer

A Fistful of Gun: For a Few Gun More is a 2015 top-down shooter game developed by FarmerGnome and published by Devolver Digital. The game features eleven playable characters with differing weapons, attributes, and control schemes. Players engage in procedurally generated fights, clearing waves of enemies before progressing. Power-ups and handicaps affect the player character's abilities, such as movement and shooting speed. Horses allow a character to move faster and endure one additional enemy shot. The game features a single-player story mode and multiplayer modes for cooperative and player-versus-player battles.

Designer Paul Hart released the first version of A Fistful of Gun as freeware in 2012. He later partnered with Devolver Digital for an expanded release after coming into contact through Twitter. Their collaboration was announced in August 2014 and the game was released in September 2015 via digital storefronts. A Fistful of Gun was met with mixed reviews from critics, who faulted its repetitiveness and sparse online lobby population. The difficulty, art style, and sound were well received.

== Gameplay ==
The character selection screen with the two possible control schemes for Abel visible

A Fistful of Gun is a top-down shooter game with a Western setting. It features eleven unlockable player characters, each with a unique weapon and custom control scheme for up to two of three input devices: mouse, keyboard, and gamepad. The type of weapon affects each character's attributes, such as shooting and movement speeds.

The single-player story mode follows a plot in which Clayton Boon, an evil railroad tycoon, has made a deal with the Devil and must be eliminated within twelve days. The mode consists of a randomised sequence of arena battles, where the player character fights waves of enemies in a destructible environment. In addition to clearing each arena of enemies, the player can sometimes select a level objective, such as pushing a cart to its destination, engaging in a duel, assassinating a particular foe, or rescuing people from a stampede.

The player can increase their score by collecting gold dropped by defeated enemies. Being hit by enemy fire results in the player losing a life, depleting lives triggers a game over. When in a neutral zone, such as around banks, the player is not attacked. If they still start a fight, they obtain a wanted level and must defeat the sheriff or receive a handicap for the next fight. Collectable power-ups have positive effects, such as whisky slowing down time and increasing the damage the player inflicts on enemies. Mountable horses increase the player's movement speed and shield them from one hit by an enemy.

In the arcade mode, up to nine players (locally or via online multiplayer) engage in cooperative fights with all player characters available. Following each fight, players are rewarded with ability bonuses (such as explosive bullets, increased movement speed, and more accurate shots) for the next battle. In the online versus mode, players fight against each other.

== Development ==
A Fistful of Gun was developed by the Australian developer Paul Hart (formerly Greasley) under the moniker FarmerGnome. After the closure of many prominent game studios in his native Brisbane, he moved to Wellington, New Zealand, in 2009. Hart chose "that cheesy Clint Eastwood gunslinger Spaghetti Western vibe where everybody has a moustache, everybody is grizzled" as the game's theme. Hart announced the game as Already Dead in September 2012 via TIGSource's forums, later changing it to A Fistful of Gun while looking for name suggestions. He released the game's first version as freeware in December 2012, distributing it via his website and later through Game Jolt. This version featured gameplay for up to three players on the same personal computer, each using a different input device. Alongside the initial release, Hart posted a request for a composer and sound effects designer, leading Surasshu to join the project later in December 2012. Hart continued developing the game and intended to release future versions through his site's mailing list.

When a Twitter user pointed the publisher Devolver Digital to a video about the game, Hart jokingly suggested that they collaborate on releasing the game despite intending to complete it by himself. However, he and the company began discussing the idea and eventually agreed to a publishing deal. Devolver Digital announced its involvement in August 2014, scheduling the game's release for early 2015. The new version, subtitled "For a Few Gun More", was expanded to feature eleven playable characters and up to nine players in offline or online multiplayer. The 2012 alpha version remained available for free. A Fistful of Gun was exhibited at the Indie Megabooth at the 2014 PAX Prime event and at 2015's PAX East.

In August 2015, Devolver Digital announced the release date for A Fistful of Gun as 24 September 2015. Later that month, the company released a trailer introducing the player characters, followed by a launch trailer in September. A Fistful of Gun was released via Steam, GOG.com, and the Humble Store. The game's servers suffered outages during the weekend after the launch. A Halloween update, Undeadorado, was released on 29 October 2015. Surasshu released A Fistful of Gun's soundtrack, featuring one track with vocals by Eldad and lyrics by Eldad and Lee Williams, via Bandcamp on 29 April 2016.

== Reception ==
Reception

Aggregate score
Aggregator	Score
Metacritic	60/100

Review scores
Publication	Score
Destructoid	6/10
Games.cz	80/100
Vandal	7/10

A Fistful of Gun received "mixed or average reviews", according to the review aggregator website Metacritic, which calculated a weighted average rating of 60/100 based on ten critic reviews. Stephen Turner of Destructoid found that the game's "only major errors lie in its repetitive and muddied action, all blasted through an ADD pacing", leading to a lack of replay value. Vandal's Ramón Nafria praised the game for challenging the player without resorting to bullet hell gameplay. Both were fond of the art style, calling it "charming" and "very pleasant", respectively, but criticised the obscurity of important elements like characters and reticles during busy combat scenes. Nafria and Ondřej Švára of Games.cz further described the game's sound as apt for the Western theme. Švára noted that the character variety highly incentivised multiplayer, which he said was more fun and less demanding than the single-player mode. Kotaku Australia's Mike Fahey believed the multiplayer modes to be the game's highlight, but noted that he was unable to play them due to sparsely populated lobbies. Nafria and Turner similarly cited poor online play caused by too few players.
