= Dungeon Hearts =

2013 match three roguelike RPG game

- Dungeon Heart's Steam graphic, depicting the four heroes.
- Developer: Cube Roots
- Publisher: Devolver Digital
- Designer: Chris Pavia
- Programmer: Chris Pavia
- Artist: Chris Pavia
- Engine: Unity
- Platforms: Windows, macOS, iOS, Wii U
- Release: Windows, MacOS, iOS: WW: March 28, 2013; Wii U: NA: November 10, 2016
- Genres: Puzzle, RPG
- Mode: Single-player

Dungeon Hearts is a match-three role-playing video game developed by Cube Roots and published by Devolver Digital. The game originally released in March 2013 on Windows, macOS, and iOS. An updated version, titled Dungeon Hearts DX, was developed and published by Wolfgame and released for the Wii U in November 2016.

== Gameplay ==
An battle in Dungeon Hearts, showing the four protagonists fighting an enemy.

Dungeon Hearts is a 2D match-three roguelike role-playing video game game where the player controls a set of four side-scrolling lines of symbols of various colors, referred to as Chargers, with each color corresponding to a playable character, and each line corresponding to a hero, as the symbols gradually move to the left of the screen and disappear.

While in combat, these Chargers can be grouped into groups of three in order to transform them into a symbol called a Striker. When tapped on, the Striker initiates an attack corresponding to the color of the Striker to deal damage to an enemy on the right of the screen. When two or more Strikers are in the same row or column when one is tapped, it creates a combo which increases damage and lets multiple characters attack if more than one color Striker is activated. There are also grey colored Strikers, which indicate enemy attacks. Upon them reaching the left side of the screen they deal damage to the line of the hero corresponding to the line. These Strikers can be removed by using your own Strikers in the same row or column. Over time, the game introduces additional grey symbols which can apply debuffs, as well as Strikers that require multiple hits or specific colors to hit them.

In between rounds of combat, the symbols change shape to instead be one of four color symbols inside squares. When these are matched into three, they increase the level corresponding to the hero's color by one. As each heroes reach a specific level, they gain unique skills to help fight against the total of 47 monsters across the game.

Upon losing a battle, your levels and progression are reset back to zero.

== Plot ==
The protagonists of this game are the party of four heroes you play as, being a swordsman, a mage, a cleric, and an archer respectively. The red swordsman is called Brand, who is a fighter that made a promise to give up the sword. The yellow mage is referred to as Jin, who is a mage that is obsessed with trying to unlock a great mystery. The blue cleric is called August, who is a healer that was exiled from his order. The final member, which is the green archer called Telina, is the last member of a tribe with a mysterious curse.

Their main goal throughout the game is to defeat the mysterious Dark One.

== Development and release ==
Dungeon Hearts was developed as a one-man team, with just a developer by the name of Chris Pavia mainly working on it. The game was first pitched to its publisher, Devolver Digital in early March 2012 during the Game Developers Conference that year through that publisher's Pitch Fork Parker program, managing to successfully get completion funds and a publishing deal from Devolver Digital. Around a week or two later, the game would be revealed by Chris Pavia on his YouTube channel where he posted its first devlog.

After a year of further development, the game would officially release on March 28, 2013 worldwide through Steam and the Apple app store.

=== Dungeon Hearts DX ===
Two and a half years after release in September 2015, a new development team called Wolfgame would announce that Dungeon Hearts would release on the Wii U under the new name Dungeon Hearts DX, containing new features like additional characters and an entirely new hub area. The developers originally wanted to just directly port the game to the Wii U, however the extra work needed to get the game to function properly created the need for them to completely rework the game to function properly. It would originally be estimated to have a release date sometime during February 2016, but this would then be delayed until November 10, 2016 when it would officially release.

== Reception ==
Reception

Aggregate score
Aggregator	Score
Metacritic	73/100

Review scores
Publication	Score
Destructoid	7/10
Game Informer	6/10
Gamezebo	60/100
MacLife	1.5/5
Pocket Gamer	3/5
GamingNexus	8/10

Dungeon Hearts received "mixed or average" reviews according to the review aggregation website Metacritic.

Allistair Pinsof from Destructoid appreciated the sense of progression but would criticize the controls of the game, especially with the PC version, and its lack of polish. Adam Beissener from Game Informer would however instead praise the good ideas with the skill system, but lambast the game for its poor gameplay at its core. Eli Cymet of Gamezebo would compliment its art style and soundtrack but would comment how much the controls detract from the experience. Matt Clark from MacLife would give a good word over the game's concept but would criticize its level up system and the inclusion of certain mechanics that make the game "increasingly frustrating". Matthew Deiner of Pocket Gamer would mirror much of the other comments of liking the concept, but having his own critiques of the lack of a pause button. Cyril Lachel from GamingNexus would praise the game for its concept and innovation on the format but would criticize it for the game's minimal story beats beyond the opening cinematic.
