= Okhlos =

2016 video game

- Developer: Coffee Powered Machine
- Publisher: Devolver Digital
- Designers: Sebastián Gioseffi; Roque Rey Ordoñez
- Programmer: Sebastián Gioseffi
- Artist: Roque Rey Ordoñez
- Composer: Gordon McGladdery
- Engine: Unity
- Platforms: Microsoft Windows, OS X, Linux, iOS
- Release: 18 August 2016; iOS; 19 November 2020 (Sigma)
- Genres: Action, roguelike
- Mode: Single-player

Okhlos is an action and roguelike video game developed by Coffee Powered Machine and published by Devolver Digital. It was released on 18 August 2016.

== Plot ==
Okhlos is set in ancient Greece, where the land is ruled by the Olympian gods, who are highly praised by the people. However, the game's protagonist, an unnamed philosopher, is critical about their behaviour, as they show no signs of interest in the human well-being. But, when the philosopher suddenly witnesses, how the School of Athens is bruised down by one of the gods' foot (parodying The Foot of Cupid), killing almost everyone inside, he decides to take action. Going from city to city, he convinces the people that the gods are no good for mankind, as they turn people into animals, impregnate women and kill innocents, and recruits them to form a giant mob. As the mob grows, the philosopher continues executing his plan to overthrow the gods, kill their minions, and form an ochlocracy, while his mob destroys everything standing in their way.

== Gameplay ==
Okhlos is often compared to Pikmin, as the player rules over a huge mob, directing it to go to the commanded spots, in combination with Katamari for the fast-paced action. Upon touching, the mob will automatically start tearing down buildings, attack enemies or recruit new people. Additionally, the player can make the mob block or spread around the city they are in to protect the player from enemies or hazards. The game's eight worlds are procedurally generated, each featuring different hazards and enemies to face. Every city includes shops, in which the player may buy upgrades for individual units of the mob, or increase the number of people able to join it. To that, the player may, in the shops, also trade units for famous Greek philosophers and heroes, such as Aristotle and Heracles. Over the course of the game, the player faces and battles all of the Twelve Olympians, as well as randomly encountering other major enemies, like the Oracle of Delphi or the Minotaur. In case the player dies, he will take over one of the philosophers from the mob, except if there are no philosophers left, which will cause the player to lose.

== Development ==
Development on Okhlos started in November 2012, after Argentinian indie studio Coffee Powered Machine released the Enhanced Edition of their previous title, Gravity Fleet, to the App Store on 13 November 2012. The team decided to create a game about an angry mob in ancient Greece, consisting of mythological heroes, that is fighting the Olympian gods. The team started off working on the non-player character's flocking behavior, and continued working on core mechanics for the game's "angry mob" concept. When procedural generation was implemented into the game, the team was unhappy about its simple algorithm and instead shifted their design focus to static, pre-built worlds. A longer silent development phase took place, until they revealed the new designs and mechanics, and also the different gameplay types the tested, on 26 June 2013. A total of 24 prototypes were created, which included, but was not limited to, a beat 'em up, a stealth game and the roguelike style the decided to build on. Another successful six months of development went by, to the point, where Coffee Powered Machine decided to get to work on the procedural generation algorithm again, and therefore dropped the static worlds in early 2014. However, the project nearly ceased, as the team ran out of money shortly after, but where help up by private investors. The development could continue and the team made a lot of progress by the end of 2014. This progress later led to the game being sent to the Independent Games Festival 2015, which was held from 2 March 2015 until 6 March 2015 in San Francisco, California. Additionally, it was announced to be featured in the Leftfield Collection at EGX Rezzed 2015, which took place from 12 March 2015 to 14 March 2015 in London, United Kingdom. Due to the good reputation, Coffee Powered Machine submitted the game to Steam Greenlight on 12 May 2015, which was eventually greenlit just six days after, namely, on 18 May 2015, to which pre-orders were opened. The game's growing popularity then brought the team to the third edition Brazil's Independent Games Festival, which was held from 27 June 2015 until 5 July 2015 in São Paulo, Brazil, where they won the "Melhor Gameplay" ("Best Gameplay") award. New big news arose, as Devolver Digital announced that they had signed-up with Coffee Powered Machine for a publishing deal for Okhlos, on 25 August 2015. Devolver Digital then brought Okhlos onto the stage of PAX Prime 2015 in Seattle, Washington, United States. On 25 January 2016, it was announced that the game will be released in March or April 2016, however, it was delayed to June 2016, and finally, as announced on 28 July 2016, was released on 18 August 2016.
