= Deconstructeam =

Spanish video game developer

- Company type: Privately held company
- Industry: Video games
- Founded: 13 March 2012; 13 years ago
- Founder: Jordi de Paco
- Headquarters: Valencia, Spain
- Key people: Jordi de Paco; Marina González; Paula "Fingerspit" Ruiz
- Products: Gods Will Be Watching; The Red Strings Club
- Website: deconstructeam.com

Deconstructeam is a Spanish video game developer based in Valencia. Founded in March 2012 by Jordi de Paco, it is best known for developing Gods Will Be Watching (2014) and The Red Strings Club (2018), both published by Devolver Digital, which became their publisher after the 26th Ludum Dare game jam. The company made a notable leap after that moment, raising more than €20,000 on crowdfunding platform Indiegogo and becoming one of the most relevant independent video game company located in Spain during the mid and late 2010s. In 2021, the studio released Essays on Empathy, a commercial compilation of their short-form work for game jams and De Tres al Cuarto, developed specifically for the release.

== Games developed ==
- Gods Will Be Watching
- The Red Strings Club
- Atticus VII
- Underground Hangovers
- Dungen Dogan's Cursed Crew
- Ages of Irving
- Newbie Conviction
- Fear Syndicate Thesis
- Deconstructorium
- Q.S.U.D.I.
- A Heart for Dimitri
- Dan and the Stone Mask
- Interview with the Whisperer
- The Cosmic Wheel Sisterhood
- Virtue and a Sledgehammer
