= OmniBus (video game) =

2016 video game

- Logo of OmniBus
- Developer: Buddy Cops, LLC
- Publisher: Devolver Digital
- Designers: Amir Badri; Jeremy Crockett
- Programmer: Jeremy Crockett
- Artist: Amir Badri
- Writers: Amir Badri; Jeremy Crockett
- Composer: Jeremy Crockett
- Engine: Unity
- Platforms: Microsoft Windows, OS X, Linux
- Release: WW: May 26, 2016
- Genres: Action, platform
- Modes: Single-player, multiplayer

OmniBus is a physics-based action platform video game developed by American indie development studio Buddy Cops, LLC and published by Devolver Digital. The game follows an unstoppable bus with which the player must accomplish missions or defeat other players in head-to-head combat. It was released on May 26, 2016, for Microsoft Windows, OS X, and Linux.

== Gameplay ==
In OmniBus, the player controls an unstoppable bus with which the player is able to break through most in-game objects, unless the bus lands on its roof or falls off the map. The player's bus is unable to stop or slow down; rather, its speed increases over time.

OmniBus gives the player the choice between free-play and single-player mode. In the latter, the player is given a specific instruction to accomplish using the bus, such as robbing a bank or safely carrying passengers. In addition, OmniBus features local multiplayer for up to four players in head-to-head deathmatch mode.

== Development ==
OmniBus's art style is similar to classic PlayStation games' low-poly 3D design, and its unstoppable bus has been compared to the plot of the 1994 film Speed. Development on the game began in summer 2014, when DePaul University students Amir Badri and Jeremy Crockett decided to make a physics-based game about a bus; however, the development was halted for almost a year. After development resumed, the team released a playable demo of OmniBus to itch.io and launched a Kickstarter campaign. During the campaign, it was announced the game would be shown at indie game festival Bit Bash in Chicago, Illinois, on August 22, 2015.

On January 14, 2016, publisher Devolver Digital released a trailer titled "The Story of OmniBus", which depicted the game as a lost and repeatedly canceled title from the 1990s, finally releasing in 2016 after over 20 years of being vaporware. The video also served to announce that Devolver would be publishing OmniBus. It was then announced that it would be released in Spring 2016 on Steam. OmniBus was brought to PAX South 2016 in San Antonio, Texas, in January 2016.

On May 19, 2016, it was announced that OmniBus would be released on May 26, 2016. The game was released in three editions: the Free Edition, consisting of printable papercraft models of game objects; the Game of the Year Edition, including the game itself and its soundtrack; and the Ultimate Bus Driver Edition, a one-off $7,500 package including the Game of the Year Edition and a 1977 MCI charter bus, which would have to be picked up in Austin, Texas.

== Reception ==
Reception

Aggregate score
Aggregator	Score
Metacritic	55/100

Review scores
Publication	Score
GameRevolution	2/5
Hardcore Gamer	4/5

OmniBus received "mixed or average" reviews, according to review aggregator platform Metacritic.

Jed Whitaker at Game Revolution noted that the game physics, though intentionally unsound for the sake of satire, had a detrimental effect on the experience. The soundtrack was said to be one of the worst he had ever heard, while the free play mode was described to have been a useless addition to "an overall shallow game". However, Whitaker singled out the multiplayer mode as OmniBus' only redeeming quality, alongside a few of the story levels.

Writing for Hardcore Gamer, Kyle LeClair praised the execution of it deliberately being "so bad, it's good". Like Whitaker, LeClair found the story levels enjoyable, and despite its flawed physics, thought the gameplay was rewarding and challenging. LeClair observed that the music and free play mode lacked variety, but were otherwise entertaining.
