= Enter the Gungeon =

2016 video game

- Developer: Dodge Roll
- Publisher: Devolver Digital
- Designer: Dave Crooks
- Programmers: David Rubel; Brent Sodman
- Artist: Joe Harty
- Composer: Doseone
- Engine: Unity
- Platforms: Linux; macOS; PlayStation 4; Windows; Xbox One; Nintendo Switch; Google Stadia; Android; iOS
- Release: Linux, macOS, PS4, Windows; April 5, 2016; Xbox One; April 5, 2017; Switch; December 14, 2017; Stadia; December 22, 2020; Android, iOS; August 2025
- Genres: Bullet hell, Roguelite
- Modes: Single-player, multiplayer

Enter the Gungeon is a 2016 bullet hell roguelike video game developed by American studio Dodge Roll and published by Devolver Digital. Set in the firearms-themed Gungeon, gameplay follows several player characters called Gungeoneers as they traverse procedurally generated rooms to find a gun that can "kill the past". The Gungeoneers fight against bullet-shaped enemies, which are fought using both conventional and exotic weapons. Enter the Gungeon features a permadeath system, causing the Gungeoneers to lose all obtained items and start again from the first level upon death. Between playthroughs, players can travel to an area called the Breach, where they can converse with non-player characters and unlock new items randomly encountered while playing.

Development on Enter the Gungeon started in 2014, when four Mythic Entertainment employees left the company to form Dodge Roll. Lead designer Dave Crooks gained inspiration for the term "Gungeon" after listening to the soundtrack for the game Gun Godz. Dodge Roll designed and playtested each individual room of the Gungeon's levels, and used procedural generation to assemble them into a random configuration. Many of the guns were inspired by earlier games such as Mega Man and Metroid, while other mechanics were implemented to encourage players to utilize the layouts of levels.

Enter the Gungeon was first released on April 5, 2016, for Linux, macOS, PlayStation 4, and Windows 10. By June 2020, it had sold over three million copies. The game received positive reviews on release, with critics favorably comparing it to The Binding of Isaac and Nuclear Throne. Reviewers praised the creativity and designs of the guns, while also commentating on the game's difficulty. Dodge Roll developed and released several content updates from 2017 to 2019. A platform game spin-off called Exit the Gungeon was released in 2019, and a direct sequel, Enter the Gungeon 2, is set for release in 2026.

== Gameplay ==
The Convict Gungeoneer shooting projectiles

Enter the Gungeon is a top-down bullet hell shooter with roguelike elements. The player takes control of one of four characters, (Note: In cooperative multiplayer, another player may also assist the chosen Gungeoneer using a fifth character called the Cultist.) the Marine, Convict, Hunter, or Pilot (collectively called the "Gungeoneers"), who must reach the bottom of the Gungeon to find a magical gun that can "kill the past". Although each Gungeoneer starts out with items and weapons that are unique to the character, they can all shoot guns, knock over tables to provide cover, and dodge attacks by performing a "dodge roll" that allows them to be temporarily invulnerable to damage. The player further has a limited number of "Blanks" which can be used to delete all enemy projectiles in a room. Combat is reliant upon memorizing patterns of enemy behavior, and using cover and dodge rolls to avoid bullets.

The Gungeon is made up of five different floors, each having roughly twenty rooms inside. The layout and rewards of each level are procedurally generated from a number of pre-created rooms, and are inhabited by bullet-shaped enemies called Gundead. To defeat Gundead, the player uses a wide variety of guns and items; they can be obtained by unlocking chests or through shops and boss fights. As players slay enemies, they obtain in-game currencies called bullet casings and keys. Bullet casings can be spent at shops in exchange for guns and items, and keys are used to unlock chests. Obtained guns range from conventional pistols and rifles, to more exotic firearms such as a unicorn horn that fires rainbows or a mailbox that shoots envelopes. Each level ends with a random boss that must be slain to advance to the next floor. Similar to other roguelikes, Enter the Gungeon has a permadeath system; If the player dies, they lose all items and guns obtained on a playthrough and must start again at the first floor.

As the player progresses through multiple playthroughs, they may encounter non-player characters (NPCs) inside the Gungeon. Once encountered, NPCs either set up shop inside the Gungeon, or travel to the Breach, a hub world. At the Breach, the player can unlock new items that randomly generate inside the Gungeon, or can talk with NPCs to accept services and quests. Both actions involve spending an in-game currency acquired from defeating bosses, with unlocked guns increasing the weapon options available on a playthrough.

== Development ==
Development on Enter the Gungeon started in 2014, with four Mythic Entertainment employees leaving the company to fulfill their own project just before the company would shut down later that year. According to developer Dave Crooks, he had been listening to the soundtrack to the game Gun Godz by Vlambeer, and the name "Gungeon" came to him the next day. Crooks presented the name Enter the Gungeon to his fellow team members, and they created the game's lore over a lunch meeting. They then spent the next few weeks developing prototypes of the game mechanics. Though Crooks stated that The Binding of Isaac was one of the game's biggest influences, they also were influenced by Nuclear Throne, Spelunky, Dark Souls, and Metal Gear Solid.

Dungeons in the game are generated in a procedural manner, but Dodge Roll found it was better to handcraft the individual rooms, playtesting those individually, and then using their random generation to connect these rooms into a dungeon. The designs of the guns took place over the two years of development, with most of the designs by team artist Joe Harty; several of the guns are inspired by other video games and video game systems, including the NES Zapper and guns similar to those appearing in games such as Mega Man, Metroid, Shadow Warrior, and Serious Sam. The boss character designs were made by a combination of ideas from Crooks and Harty, which were then presented to the gameplay programmer David Rubel to determine appropriate bullet hell patterns associated with that idea.

The dodge roll mechanic was inspired by trying to include a similar mechanic of Ikaruga that enabled a player to easily dodge numerous bullets simultaneously, and took the ideas used in the Dark Souls series to have the character dodge out of the way from attacks. The team loved this mechanic and decided to name their studio after it. Similarly, they included usable environmental features such as flipping tables or bringing chandeliers down onto enemies to encourage the player to interact with and use the environment to their own advantage. At one point Dodge Roll included an active reload feature, similar to Gears of War in which pressing a button at the right time during a reload would increase the damage the reloaded bullets would do, but instead decided to limit this to a power-up that can be collected, finding that players were already distracted by everything else in the game and that the moment of tension when the player had to wait for the gun to reload was critical to gameplay.

== Release ==
In December 2014, at Sony Computer Entertainment's PlayStation Experience, the game was officially announced for the PlayStation 4 and Windows followed by an announcement trailer. Throughout 2015, the game went to multiple conventions, including E3 2015, where, during the PC Gaming Show, the co-op feature of the game was revealed. On March 2, 2016, it was announced that the game would release on April 5, 2016. The game was set to receive free post-release content, such as more weapons, enemies, and levels. The first of these, the "Supply Drop" update, which added several new guns, enemies, and room layouts, was released for free on January 26, 2017. A port to the Xbox One, including cross-buy and cross-save support for Windows 10, was released a year later on April 5, 2017. A version for the Nintendo Switch was released on December 14, 2017. A second major update, "Advanced Gungeons & Draguns", was released on July 19, 2018, for all platforms, which added additional weapons and enemies. The updated provided balance changes with the intent of making the game easier for inexperienced players, while still offering challenges.

While Dodge Roll had been working on a third major update, the team decided by November 2018 to cancel it so to focus their efforts on a new game. The developers stated that the amount of time they had put into "Advanced Gungeons & Draguns" brought the total time they had been working on the game to five years. Each new gun they added had to be tested against other effects already in the game, which wore out the development team. Dodge Roll released a final free patch, "A Farewell to Arms", in April 2019 to fix lingering bugs and provide a final content update. This update included new weapons and two Gungeoneers called the Paradox and the Gunslinger. A version for the cloud-streaming service Google Stadia was released in late December 2020. Ports for iOS and Android were released in August 2025.

== Reception ==
Reception

Aggregate scores
Aggregator	Score
Metacritic	PC: 83/100; PS4: 82/100; XONE: 85/100; NS: 87/100
OpenCritic	88% recommend

Review scores
Publication	Score
Destructoid	9.5/10
Electronic Gaming Monthly	4/5
Hardcore Gamer	4.5/5
IGN	8.5/10
PC Gamer (US)	78/100
The Escapist	3.5/5

According to the review aggregation website Metacritic, Enter the Gungeon received generally favorable reviews from critics. Fellow review aggregator OpenCritic assessed that the game received "mighty" approval, being recommended by 88% of critics. Critics frequently compared the game to The Binding of Isaac, and Nuclear Throne. Destructoid drew comparisons between the dungeons of Zelda and the difficulty of Nuclear Throne, saying "While it doesn't totally reinvent the twin-stick shooter, it has all but perfected it." Game Informer recommended the game to fans of both roguelikes and twin-stick shooters, saying it exceeded both The Binding of Isaac and Nuclear Throne. Nintendo Life called it one of the best indie games on the Nintendo Switch, while USgamer considered it one of the best roguelike twin-stick shooters.

Reviewers praised the variety and creativity of guns and items, but were disappointed by the frequent generation of conventional weapons. Game Informer said that discovering new guns made each playthrough enjoyable, while Eurogamer called the guns "wondrously exotic". Despite considering most conventional guns too similar to each other, IGN enjoyed the pop culture references, designs, and sound effects of the weaponry.

The difficulty of the game was frequently mentioned. Destructoid said that the enemies of the lower floors were very challenging, and PC Gamer called the bosses "the hardest things I've ever encountered." The Escapist found the learning curve of the game's mechanics to be generally fair, but considered some of the enemies and bosses frustrating. While previously yearning for easier levels of difficulty, Electronic Gaming Monthly considered it helpful for teaching players how to improve their skills. Likewise, both Rock Paper Shotgun and Nintendo World Report considered their troubles with gameplay to be the result of a lack of skill, and accredited the game for not having its difficulty be based upon an imbalance of mechanics.

=== Sales ===
Enter the Gungeon sold more than 200,000 copies within its first week across all platforms, with Steam Spy suggesting that 75% of these sales were made on Steam. By January 2017, the game had sold more than 800,000 units across all platforms, according to Devolver Digital. Total sales across all platforms exceeded 3 million by January 2020.

== Legacy ==
A spin-off, Exit the Gungeon was developed by Dodge Roll and originally released for iOS devices through Apple Arcade on September 19, 2019. Whereas Enter the Gungeon has the player attempt to reach the lowest level of the Gungeon, Exit the Gungeon requires the player to escape from the Gungeon as it is collapsing. The game plays similarly to Enter the Gungeon, but is a platform game rather than a top-down dungeon crawler. In 2019, an arcade spin-off Enter the Gungeon: House of the Gundead was announced, and was released in 2022. A sequel with a 3D art style called Enter the Gungeon 2 was announced April 2025, and is scheduled for release in 2026 for Windows and Nintendo Switch 2.
