= Mother Russia Bleeds =

2016 video game

- Developer: Le Cartel Studio
- Publisher: Devolver Digital
- Director: Alexandre Muttoni
- Designer: Frédéric Coispeau
- Programmer: Florian Reneau
- Artist: Alexandre Muttoni
- Writers: Frédéric Coispeau; Alexandre Muttoni; Philippe Valette
- Composer: Vincent "Fixions" Cassar
- Engine: Unity
- Platforms: Microsoft Windows, OS X, Linux, PlayStation 4, Nintendo Switch
- Release: Windows, OS X, Linux; 5 September 2016; PlayStation 4; 3 December 2016; Nintendo Switch; 15 November 2018
- Genre: Beat 'em up
- Modes: Single-player, multiplayer

Mother Russia Bleeds is a beat 'em up video game developed by France-based indie development studio Le Cartel Studio and published by Devolver Digital. The game was released worldwide for Microsoft Windows, OS X, and Linux on 5 September 2016, PlayStation 4 on 3 December 2016 and for Nintendo Switch on 15 November 2018.

== Gameplay ==
Mother Russia Bleeds has beat 'em up-style gameplay often compared to those of Streets of Rage and Double Dragon. The players are set to fight through side-scrolling, stage-by-stage levels, using guns, melee weapons or their bare fists to take out enemies. When killed, some enemies start convulsing. Players may fill their syringes with the drug from these enemies' corpses, which can then be injected to refill health or to go into berserk mode, which adds strength and speed to the player. The game can be played in single-player or local multiplayer co-op for up to four players, in the classic arcade campaign, survival, and boss rush modes.

== Plot ==
Mother Russia Bleeds is set in an alternate 1980s Soviet Union ruled by the Russian Mafia. Four Ruska Romani - Sergei, Natasha, Ivan and Boris - work for a man named Mikhail and make money by street fighting in the slums. In the midst of a bout, government forces raid the operation and kidnap the four 'Gypsies'.

The party wakes up a month later in an underground laboratory built under a government prison, where they have been made guinea pigs for the concoction of an addictive drug called Nekro. They break out of their cell and escape the laboratory, killing all scientists and security in their way, while suffering increasingly intense hallucinations due to the Nekro, which they also depend on to fight through injury, and give themselves monstrous strength. After fighting through the laboratory's sewers, they discover it to be located under a prison. The party fights their way through a riot and escape the facility.

Determining that the Soviet government is working with the mafia to spread and sell Nekro, the party clears a gang of violent drug-dealing skinheads out of their former home before meeting Vlad - the pacifistic leader of an organized protest group - and defends his people on their way to a rally before parting ways to follow a tip regarding the location of Mikhail.

Tracking him down to a mob-owned fetish club, the party encounters Mikhail who, to their disgust and outrage, is working for the mafia under threat of violence against his family, having sold the party out to be used as test subjects. Mikhail escapes, and the party meets back up with Vlad, whose protest has exploded into a city-wide riot after police fired on the protestors. The party fights their way through an army of riot officers and government soldiers, and assaults the Soviet HQ.

They encounter Mikhail, who has lost his arm in exchange for being allowed to appeal to the party one last time to stop fighting. After turning him down, Mikhail leads them into a fight pit where the rich and powerful watch - in seeming obliviousness to the chaos outside - as waves of vagrants, gangsters, and animals mutated by Nekro attack the party for their amusement, only to scatter in hushed horror as the party kills them all. Mikhail, horrified by the violence, and terrified of the mafia's eventual retaliation, commits suicide in front of the party.

The party corners the government leader in his office, only to suffer a final violent hallucination in which horrifying manifestations of their crippling Nekro addiction assault them, threatening to drive them to madness. When the party overcomes their hallucination, they return to reality, only to find that they have brutally murdered the leader.

If the Romani used Nekro to heal themselves during the fight, they die in front of Vlad, their minds and bodies fatally taxed by the extended overdose of Nekro. If they manage to overcome the hallucination without injecting more of the drug, Vlad takes them to the hospital where they recuperate from their injuries and get the Nekro out of their systems. In an epilogue they find that the revolution has overthrown the government, and erected a statue in their honor, having been positioned as 'the face of the revolution' by Vlad, despite the party's discomfort about the violence they committed to accomplish their goal. Vlad assures them that many heroes before them committed the same atrocities they did to accomplish their goals and the general public is unaware what the Romani did to attain this victory.

== Development ==
Mother Russia Bleeds was heavily inspired by Streets of Rage, Double Dragon and Renegade. The game's development started in September 2013, after former Ubisoft Paris game designer Frédéric Coispeau quit his job and met web designer Alexandre Muttoni, with whom he then formed Le Cartel Studio on 20 August 2013. Le Cartel Studio soon started working on the story and some artworks for their game. In October 2013, the crew welcomed its new programmer, Florian Reneau, where the new composer, Vincent "Fixions" Cassar, followed shortly.

After a few productive months, Le Cartel Studio opened the Mother Russia Bleeds website, with that making the official announcement to their project, on 1 March 2014. At the end of that same month, Le Cartel Studio uploaded a pre-alpha gameplay teaser for Mother Russia Bleeds on 30 March 2014. The level featured scenes from the level "Night Club", which was heavily inspired by Hotline Miami, which led to a huge spread of the teaser. A week after, Le Cartel Studio announced that the games was going to release in Q1 2015 for Microsoft Windows, OS X and Linux, and if it sells well also for PlayStation 3, PlayStation 4 and PlayStation Vita, as well as Xbox 360 and Xbox One, set to run through a crowd funding campaign, which was later canceled.

On 18 June 2014, Le Cartel Studio decided to the let the fans of their game's VK page decide on the characters' names, which resulted in "Sergei", "Ivan", "Natasha" and "Boris". The pre-alpha teaser of Mother Russia Bleeds was later acknowledged by Dennaton Games' Jonatan Söderström and Dennis Wedin, the creators of the Hotline Miami, which the level shown in the teaser was inspired by. Söderström and Wedin then recommended the game to Devolver Digital, resulting in a partnership between the two companies, just a few months after.

At Sony's E3 2015 press conference, Mother Russia Bleeds was officially announced under its new publisher, and was announced for the PlayStation 4. The first trailer for the game followed shortly after the Sony press conference, which, besides PlayStation 4, also confirmed the game for Microsoft Windows, OS X and Linux. As announced on 10 August 2016, Mother Russia Bleeds was released for Microsoft Windows, OS X, and Linux on 5 September 2016. Alongside, a Dealer Edition of the game was released, including a second copy of the game, the original soundtrack by Vincent "Fixions" Cassar, and the Behind the Schemes mini-documentary. The same day, a port for PlayStation 4 was announced to be in the works, which was released on 3 December 2016. On 15 November 2018, the game was released for Nintendo Switch.

== Reception ==
Reception

Aggregate score
Aggregator	Score
Metacritic	(PC) 70/100 (PS4) 71/100

Review scores
Publication	Score
Destructoid	9/10
Game Informer	8/10
GameSpot	7/10
PC Gamer (US)	54/100

Mother Russia Bleeds received "mixed or average" reviews, according to review aggregator Metacritic.
