= Heavy Bullets =

2014 video game

- Developer: Terri Vellmann
- Publisher: Devolver Digital
- Composer: Doseone
- Engine: Unity
- Platforms: Microsoft Windows, OS X, Linux
- Release: WW: 18 September 2014
- Genres: First-person shooter, roguelite
- Mode: Single-player

Heavy Bullets is a roguelike first-person shooter video game developed by Brazil-based indie developer Terri Vellmann and published by Devolver Digital. The game was released for Microsoft Windows, OS X, and Linux on 18 September 2014.

== Gameplay ==
Heavy Bullets is a first-person shooter video game. The player character is armed with a pistol and a low amount of ammunition which can be retrieved upon firing. The player's objective is to battle through 8 levels and reset a security mainframe. Levels are procedurally generated. Killing enemies rewards the player with money which can be used to purchase usable and passive items. Upon death the player will not respawn, a new play-through must be started. Money can be deposited in a bank and will carry over to the next play-through, the player can also purchase insurance to save money and items if they die.

== Development ==
Vellman originally began working on the title as part of a game jam. The game uses the Unity engine. Music and sound was composed by American rapper Doseone. An early access build of the game launched on Steam on 15 May 2014. The full version of the game was released on 18 September 2014.

== Reception ==
Reception

Aggregate score
Aggregator	Score
Metacritic	72/100

Review score
Publication	Score
Destructoid	6/10

Aggregate review websites Metacritic and GameRankings assigned scores of 72/100 and 74% respectively.
