= Disc Room =

2020 video game

- Developers: Terri, Dose, Kitty, and JW
- Publisher: Devolver Digital
- Composer: Doseone
- Engine: Unity
- Platforms: Linux; macOS; Windows; Nintendo Switch; Amazon Luna; Xbox One
- Release: Linux, macOS, Windows, Nintendo Switch: WW: October 22, 2020; Amazon Luna: NA: December 2021; Xbox One: WW: June 7, 2022
- Genres: Action, puzzle
- Mode: Single-player

Disc Room is a 2020 action puzzle video game developed by Terri, Dose, Kitty, and JW and published by Devolver Digital. It was originally released for Linux, macOS, Nintendo Switch and Windows, with ports for Amazon Luna and Xbox One releasing later. In the game, the player navigates a series of labyrinthine rooms while avoiding bullet hell-style projectiles. The game received positive reviews from critics for its design and gameplay.

== Gameplay ==
In Disc Room, the player navigates a series of labyrinthine rooms while avoiding bullet hell-style projectiles. Each room has its own patterns but is not predictable between rooms. Aside from surviving a set period of time, objectives of these rooms also include solving various puzzles with projectiles, dying from different types of projectiles and unlocking more rooms. The player can customize themselves with various abilities such as a clone of the player character to shield against mortal damage as well as slowing time to their favor, while collectibles are available in levels.

== Development ==
The game is a collaboration between Doseone (Adam Drucker), Terri Vellmann, Kitty Calis and Vlambeer co-founder Jan Willem Nijman; the latter two had previously developed Minit with two other independent developers in a similar collaboration. It was announced in February 2020 and released on October 22, 2020, for Linux, macOS, Nintendo Switch, and Windows, for Amazon Luna in December 2021, and for Xbox One on June 7, 2022.

== Reception ==
Reception

Aggregate scores
Aggregator	Score
Metacritic	(PC) 83/100 (NS) 81/100
OpenCritic	82% recommend

Review scores
Publication	Score
Eurogamer	Recommended
GameSpot	8/10
Nintendo Life	8/10
Nintendo World Report	8.5/10
PC Gamer (US)	78/100
Shacknews	8/10

Disc Room received "generally favorable" reviews, according to review aggregator platform Metacritic. Fellow review aggregator OpenCritic assessed that the game received strong approval, being recommended by 82% of critics.
