= Serious Sam: The Random Encounter =

2011 video game

- Cover artwork by Roy Nathan de Groot
- Developer: Vlambeer
- Publisher: Devolver Digital
- Designers: Rami Ismail; Jan Willem Nijman
- Artists: Roy Nathan de Groot; Paul Veer
- Composer: Alex Mauer
- Series: Serious Sam
- Engine: GameMaker
- Platform: Windows
- Release: 24 October 2011
- Genres: Role-playing, bullet hell
- Mode: Single-player

Serious Sam: The Random Encounter is a 2011 role-playing and bullet hell game developed by Vlambeer and published by Devolver Digital. It follows Sam "Serious" Stone travelling to the future in search of his nemesis, Mental, teaming up with mercenaries on the way. The player controls Sam and his accomplices through confined levels, engaging in battles through random encounters. These pit the player characters against large waves of enemies, and the player controls the weapons and items each character uses against them in five-second turns.

Announced in March 2011, The Random Encounter was created as part of the Serious Sam Indie Series to promote the release of Serious Sam 3: BFE. Devolver Digital initially envisioned a clone of Vlambeer's Super Crate Box. The studio disliked this idea, drafting a pitch for a turn-based role-playing game instead. The Random Encounter was released for Windows in October 2011 to a mixed reception. The combat system was given a varied response, with some critics calling it innovative. The game's tone, visuals, and sound were well received. Conflicting opinions were expressed regarding the game's arsenal and short duration.

== Gameplay ==
The player characters (right) firing a shotgun, minigun, and grenade launcher at approaching enemies

Serious Sam: The Random Encounter is a hybrid of a role-playing video game with turn-based elements and a bullet hell game. The gameplay is split into two parts, world exploration and battle sequences, in a style similar to Japanese role-playing games. In the former, the player sequentially traverses nine confined areas, distributed across three thematic worlds. Initially alone, protagonist Sam "Serious" Stone teams up with the mercenaries Bam and Bim over the course of the game. Every few steps made in these levels, a random encounter occurs, initiating a battle. In these, the player characters appear to the right of the screen, while a horde of enemies approaches from the left. The player chooses for each character to either fire their equipped weapon at the enemies, swap that weapon for another, or use an item.

When firing a weapon, the player determines how it should be used. Revolvers aim automatically, while shotguns have an adjustable radius in which they automatically aim, doing more damage to enemies at close range. Several weapons can have their trajectory angled, most of which fire in a straight line; some fire continuously, while others only have limited shots per turn. Grenade launchers can shoot at a specific point on the screen. When a character switches weapons, they lose some time before firing the newly equipped weapon. Items include additional health or armour for the characters, revivals of dead party members, a "Serious Bomb" that defeats the majority of visible enemies, and a "Kamikaze Bait" that spawns 100 (or more) Beheaded Kamikaze enemies.

In each turn, the player characters perform their selected actions, while enemies also attack. Turns last five seconds, after which the player can assign new actions. During a turn, the player may also move the entire party up or down to shift their aim or dodge enemies and their projectiles. Individual enemies have different attack styles. Characters take damage when hit by an enemy or projectile and die when their armour and health are depleted. Should all party members be dead at once, the battle ends, with the party losing a life and being reset to its position prior to the lost battle. Should the player lose all of their three lives, gameplay pauses and the active level is reset.

Battles end normally once all enemies are defeated, although additional enemies may spawn during a battle. Battles become progressively more difficult by pitting the player against more enemies. The game includes five boss fights. Through victories, the player gains some experience points that can add up to unlocking a new weapon or item. Further items can be found in chests during world exploration. Levels further include some puzzle elements, such as collecting a key, activating a switch or defeating large amounts of enemies, that the player has to solve to progress. Upon completion of the main game, an endless mode is unlocked, in which the player can play for an undetermined time to achieve the highest possible score.

== Development and release ==
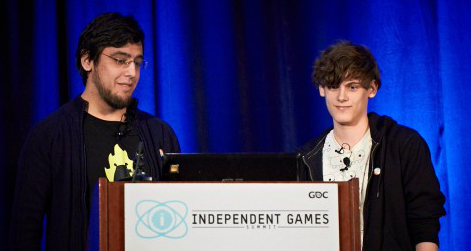
Rami Ismail (left) and Jan Willem Nijman of Vlambeer (pictured in 2013)

Vlambeer pitched the game with a crude sketch and was surprised when it was approved.

Serious Sam: The Random Encounter was developed by Vlambeer, an indie game developer composed of Rami Ismail and Jan Willem Nijman. Its previous releases included Super Crate Box and Radical Fishing. After coming across the former, Devolver Digital, the publisher of the Serious Sam series, contacted Vlambeer, asking them to develop a game for the Serious Sam Indie Series, a triplet of spin-offs to be created by small studios to promote the impending launch of the mainline first-person shooter entry Serious Sam 3: BFE. The Indie Series also encompasses Serious Sam Double D and Serious Sam: Kamikaze Attack!. Ismail and Nijman had been fans of the series, wherefore they accepted the request. However, Devolver Digital requested a copy of Super Crate Box with a Serious Sam theme, which Ismail and Nijman disliked. During a brainstorming session, they instead drafted a turn-based role-playing video game. The intent was to place the game in a genre as far away as possible from a first-person shooter, while not sacrificing other core elements of the series. From this idea, they crafted a crude drawing, which they scanned and emailed to Devolver Digital, expecting that the publisher would turn down the pitch. As such, the team was surprised when it was quickly approved. The game concept did not change significantly from the pitch thereafter. Ismail stated that Vlambeer had full creative control and would not have undergone the project otherwise.

The visuals for The Random Encounter were produced by Roy Nathan de Groot and Paul Veer. De Groot worked on all static assets, starting with designing the first world and the sprite for Sam. When creating Sam's accomplices, the team intended to use his sister but found that she was already deceased in the lore of the Serious Sam series. Instead, they went through the characters of the series's multiplayer modes and chose the two most "visually attractive": Groovy Gregory and Wild Wyatt. To avoid battle scenes feeling "flat", de Groot added parallax scrolling to their backgrounds. He also designed the cover artwork and, when its files were lost in a crash shortly before the associated deadline, quickly re-created it from a low-resolution version that he upscaled and re-coloured. Veer produced character animations and visual effects. Because Groovy Gregory and Wild Wyatt (now named Bam and Bim) had a shape similar to that of Sam, Veer was able to repurpose some of Sam's animations by applying different colours. For greater variety between them, he added minor cosmetic details and altered a few animations. To fit the action theme of Serious Sam, characters were fully animated, as opposed to the more static style of other role-playing video games of the time. The Random Encounter's soundtrack was composed by Alex Mauer.

Devolver Digital announced the Serious Sam Indie Series in March 2011. To prepare The Random Encounter in time for its announcement, Ismail and Nijman worked from their hotel rooms in San Francisco while attending the 2011 Game Developers Conference, on the plane back to the Netherlands, as well as at home under jet lag. They took several days off following the announcement. The game was playable for the first time at the May 2011 "Indigo Connected by Ziggo" event in the Netherlands, as well as shown at Fantastic Arcade in September 2011. During the development of The Random Encounter, a clone of Vlambeer's Radical Fishing was released by another company for iOS and quickly became successful. Because Vlambeer had itself been working on an iOS version of Radical Fishing (titled Ridiculous Fishing) that had not yet been released, this plagiarism led to demotivation within the studio, resulting in the delay of The Random Encounter and other projects. Ismail had been fully engaged in working on The Random Encounter but shifted to handling the fallout of the controversy, with Nijman taking over the game's development.

Two trailers for The Random Encounter were edited by Kert Gartner. Both were published in October 2011, the first focused on the game's mechanics, and the other coincided with the launch. The Random Encounter was released for Windows on 24 October 2011 and made available for purchase through the Get Games and Steam services. This marked Vlambeer's first commercial release, as its previous games had been freeware. The studio intended to use the revenue generated from it to purchase a Mac computer and create a Mac OS X version of the game. Vlambeer re-iterated its plan for this port in August 2016, also announcing plans to update the existing Windows version and release one for Linux.

== Reception ==
Reception

Aggregate score
Aggregator	Score
Metacritic	64/100

Review scores
Publication	Score
Destructoid	7/10
Eurogamer	8/10
GamePro	3/5
GamesRadar+	2/5
GameZone	7.0/10
IGN	7/10
RPGamer	2.5/5

Serious Sam: The Random Encounter received "mixed or average reviews", according to the review aggregator website Metacritic, which calculated a weighted average rating of 64/100 based on eleven critic reviews. Several critics—including Allistair Pinsof of Destructoid, Eric Neigher of IGN, and Lana Polansky of Kill Screen—considered the combat system innovative. The Eurogamer writer Christian Donlan described it as "ingenious", while David Sanchez of GameZone labelled it as an "excellent amalgamation of genres". Polansky specifically lauded the battle designs, which she found akin to a strategic puzzle requiring planning. Conversely, Ryan Hodge, in his review for GamesRadar, stated that these battles were "boring", "repetitive", and "monotonous". Others positively regarded the challenge posed by individual fights.

Donlan and GamePro's Nathan Meunier liked the variety in the available armament, with Donlan calling the individual weapons "endlessly satisfying". However, Pinsof and Hodge found that some of them, especially the grenade launcher, only had limited usability. Polansky and Hodge dismissed the puzzles in the overworld as "peripheral" and "unchallenging".

Pinsof, Hodge, and Shacknews's Ozzie Mejia felt that The Random Encounter's concept was a good fit for the Serious Sam series. Mejia and Sanchez pointed out that the game's humour was well aligned with that of the rest of the series. Polansky and RPGamer's Alex Fuller disliked the lack of a proper plot. Pinsof and Hodge noted an overall lack of polish, of whom Pinsof also encountered several bugs. Its visuals and sound were considered by Sanchez as apt for the series, with the art described as "pleasing to look at" by Fuller.

Many critics voiced their disappointment about the game's duration of roughly one to two hours, considering it insufficient. Hodge contrarily called it "mercifully short". Sanchez and Fuller consequently felt a sudden spike in difficulty after the first level. Polansky observed that later battles had "unpredictable" difficulties. Conversely, Mejia opined that the game had a good learning curve, although he found little replay value.
