= Nuclear Throne =

2015 video game

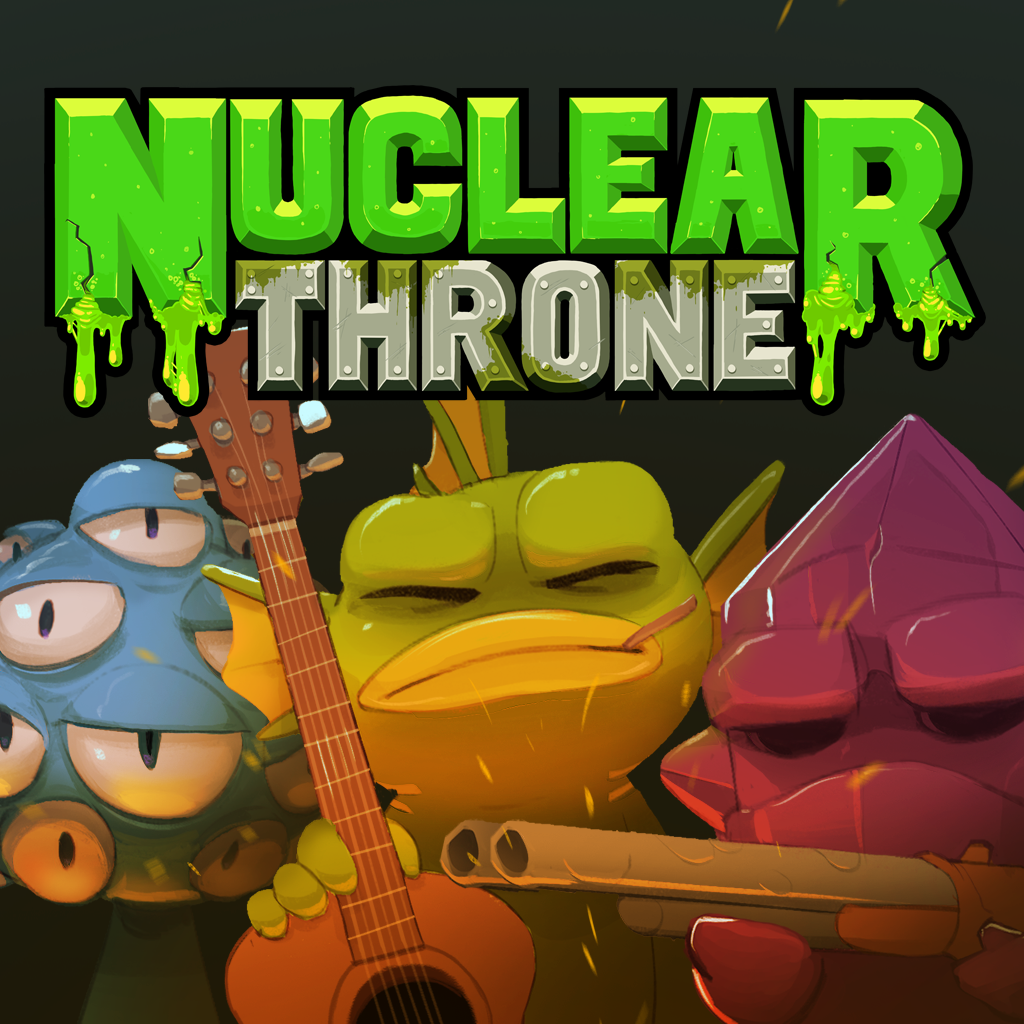
- Developer: Vlambeer
- Publisher: Vlambeer
- Director: Jan Willem Nijman
- Producer: Rami Ismail
- Designers: Jan Willem Nijman; Rami Ismail
- Programmer: Rami Ismail
- Artists: Paul Veer; Justin Chan
- Composer: Jukio Kallio
- Engine: GameMaker: Studio
- Platforms: Linux; Windows; OS X; PlayStation 4; Vita; Switch; Xbox One
- Release: Linux, Windows, OS X, PS4, Vita; December 5, 2015; Switch; March 25, 2019; Xbox One; September 9, 2021
- Genres: Shoot 'em up, bullet hell, roguelike
- Modes: Single-player, multiplayer

Nuclear Throne is a roguelike top-down shoot 'em up with bullet hell elements developed by the Dutch indie studio Vlambeer. Set in a post-apocalyptic wasteland populated by mutants, the player fights through procedurally generated levels, collecting weapons and radiation-based "mutations" in an attempt to reach the titular Nuclear Throne. The game began as a game jam prototype called Wasteland Kings in February 2013 and was developed largely in public, with most of its two-and-a-half-year production livestreamed on Twitch in a process the studio called "performative development". After more than two years in Early Access, it was released for Linux, Windows, OS X, PlayStation 4 and PlayStation Vita on December 5, 2015, and was later ported to Nintendo Switch (2019) and Xbox One (2021).

The game received generally favorable reviews, with critics praising its tight gunplay, "game feel" and replayability while noting its punishing difficulty; it holds a Metacritic score of 89/100 for the PC version. Commercially, it passed 100,000 units and US$1 million in revenue during Early Access. It is often cited as one of the defining action roguelikes of the 2010s and an influence on subsequent twin-stick roguelikes.

After Vlambeer's closure in 2020 and revival under co-founder Jan Willem Nijman in 2024, the game continued to be maintained by community-modder-turned-developer YellowAfterlife. On its tenth anniversary, December 5, 2025, it received "Update #100", which added a thirteenth character, four-player co-operative play, widescreen support and 60+ fps.

== Gameplay ==
Nuclear Throne is a top-down shooter roguelike game with bullet hell elements. The game consists of two main game modes: single-player, and a local cooperative gameplay mode. There are also daily and weekly challenge modes, allowing the player to compete against others via the Steam platform for the best score (determined by the number of kills in the playthrough), on the same set of randomly generated levels. The player controls one of a total of 13 characters, 11 of which must be unlocked through play. Two additional secret characters can only be played under special circumstances during play. Each character has an ability unique to them, adding an additional element to the gameplay. These individual abilities allow for different play-styles, improving the variety and replay value of the game. Alternate sprites or skins can be acquired for the characters played if the player completes special or secret tasks. The player progresses through the linear level structure until level 7–3, where the final boss, the Nuclear Throne, has to be defeated. After this, the player may choose to loop to the beginning of the game again with a greatly increased difficulty. The user may continue looping indefinitely until death.

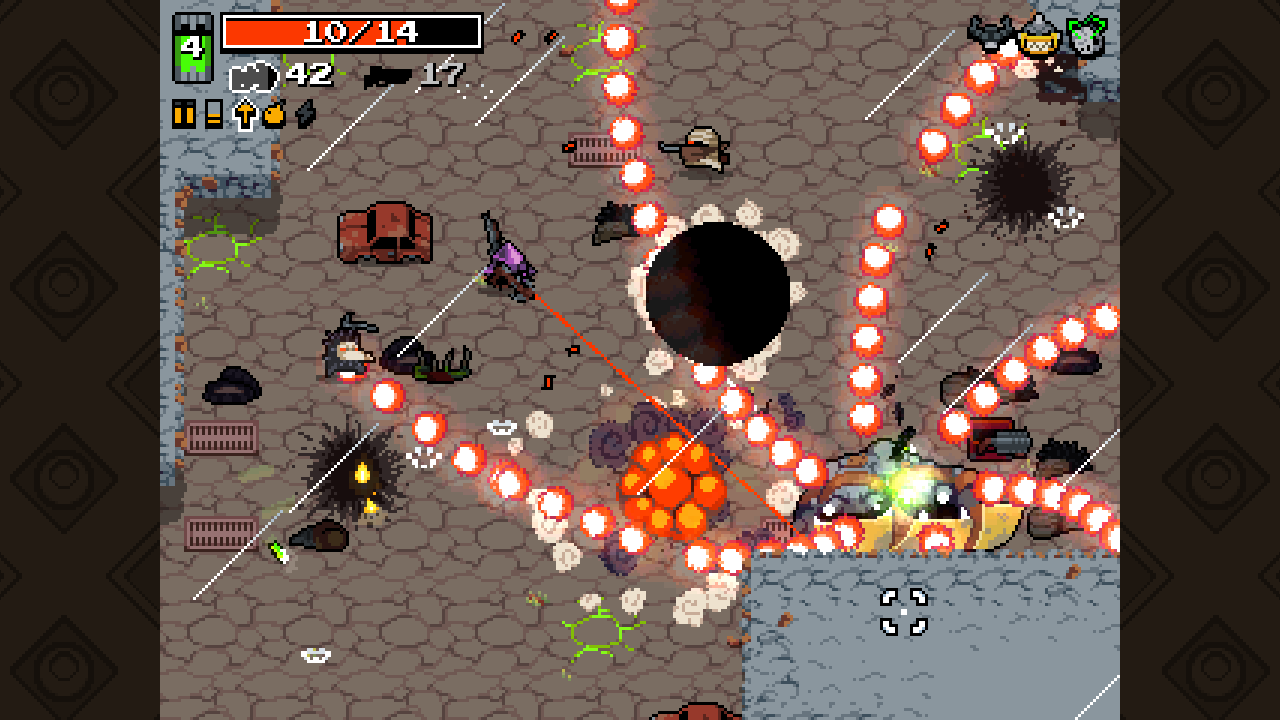
Gameplay screenshot

The game resets upon death. Except for special weapons acquired in a hidden level and "crowns" retained until after defeating the final boss, anything acquired in one playthrough does not carry over to the next. The game has a leveling system, where the player gains experience in the form of radiation pellets, or "rads", dropped by enemies, that allow them to get different mutations and choose what would benefit the character the most out of a selection of four, randomly selected mutations. Upon reaching level 10, the player can choose a character-specific "ultra-mutation".

The player starts with the basic revolver, but they may upgrade by taking weapons from red chests and collect more ammunition from yellow chests. The player can have two weapons equipped at any time, such as a shovel and an assault rifle. The weapons available to the player get increasingly advanced and powerful as the enemies become increasingly difficult and numerous. After looping the game, special "golden" and "ultra" weapons become available. Aside from certain melee weapons, weapons consume one of five different ammo types (bullet, energy, shell, bolt, and explosive).

== Plot ==
Nuclear Throne has a minimal plot. The game's community has formed theories about Nuclear Throne's story by analyzing the game's world, environment details and loading tips. Most canon information shared by the developers was revealed during development livestreams.

Set in a post-apocalyptic world, characters called mutants have gathered together with the aim of travelling throughout the world to reach the Nuclear Throne. The developers theorize each new run is a new alternate universe, where everybody is alive and they have yet to decide who will attempt to complete the task.

== Development ==
Vlambeer's Jan Willem Nijman and Rami Ismail served as the game's designer and producer, respectively, and shared the development work. Paul Veer, who had previously animated Vlambeer's Super Crate Box, returned to contribute art to Nuclear Throne. The game's promotional art was drawn by Justin Chan, an art student hired on the basis of his fan art for early releases of the game. Nuclear Throne's music was composed by Jukio Kallio, who had composed for several previous Vlambeer titles. A friend of Kallio's, Joonas Turner, worked on the sound effect design.

Jan Willem Nijman and Rami Ismail were invited by Notch, to participate in a 48-hour charity game jam called Mojam Humble in 2013. During this game jam the two created a game called Wasteland Kings which later became the prototype to Nuclear Throne. At the beginning of development, Nuclear Throne was created in Game Maker 7 before transitioning to Game Maker Studio to develop the rest of the product, a decision the team later found cumbersome. Nuclear Throne's development was secondary to their other project at the time, Luftrausers, and the team often found themselves progressively adding new features before considering taking the game seriously as a commercial option. Nuclear Throne's development took 2.5 years, beginning in February 2013 and releasing into Steam Early Access that same year. During PAX Prime 2013 Vlambeer showed off the prototype for Nuclear Throne, known as Wasteland Kings, with five of the twelve characters playable in the prototype. After the release of Nuclear Throne to early access, this prototype was made for public download. It was revealed by Rami Ismail that the name change was due primarily to a trademark issue with InXile Entertainment. Following the Mojam tradition of livestreaming the development process, the team decided to continue livestreaming their progress for Nuclear Throne which was a development process they later dubbed “Performative Game Development”. The livestreams offered opportunities for the developers to interact directly with their community and increase their game's exposure to new audiences. Rami noticed a significant boost in exposure when other live streamers on the Twitch platform were interacting with and playing Nuclear Throne. For example, they had a significant sales spike when Northernlion, a content creator, played the game on stream. Vlambeer announced PlayStation 4 and Vita releases at the December 2015 PlayStation Experience keynote.

Until December 2025, the aspect ratio of Nuclear Throne was permanently set to 4:3 instead of the industry standard 16:9. This was done to create an even balance of visual threats onscreen. Vlambeer generates their random levels using “workers”. This programming system creates tiles and walls beginning from the character with a random amount of distance it can cover. Once the walker reaches the end of its randomized distance it will place an item or object of interest such as an ammo crate or explosive barrel. Each region within the game has its own sets of random generation restrictions creating distinct differences between the progressive areas.

== Release ==
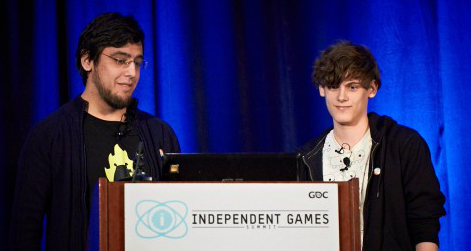
Rami Ismail and Jan Willem Nijman at GDC

In January 2016, Vlambeer teamed up with the subscription box company, IndieBox, to offer a physical release of Nuclear Throne. This limited collector's edition included a themed USB drive with DRM-free game file, soundtrack, instruction manual, Steam key, and various custom-designed collectibles.

== Reception ==
Reception

Aggregate score
Aggregator	Score
Metacritic	(PC) 89/100

Review scores
Publication	Score
Destructoid	8/10
Eurogamer	Essential
Game Informer	7.5/10
IGN	9/10
Nintendo Life	7/10
PC Gamer (US)	90/100

Nuclear Throne received "generally favorable" reviews; the PC version holds 89/100 on Metacritic. IGN's Chloi Rad scored it 9/10, calling it "an enjoyably tough run-and-gun with tons of energy and variety to justify hours and hours of replays." PC Gamer's Edwin Evans-Thirlwell gave it 90/100 and "a crowning achievement for Vlambeer, and one of the finest action-roguelikes ever made," while Eurogamer rated it "Essential." Game Informer was more measured at 7.5/10.

=== Accolades ===
Year	Award	Category	Result	Ref.
2015	Independent Games Festival Awards	Excellence in Audio	Honorable mention	
