= Gamenauts =

American video game developer

- Type: Game development studio
- Industry: Video games
- Founded: 2005
- Founder: Stanley Adrianus
- Headquarters: United States
- Website: www.gamenauts.com

Gamenauts is an independent game development studio based in Silicon Valley, founded by Stanley Adrianus.

== History ==
Gamenauts was founded in September 2005 by Stanley Adrianus, formerly of Yahoo! Games.

In 2012, the company announced a publishing initiative for indie Asian developers, signing up studios from South East Asia such as Kurechii Studio, Menara Games, Artlogic Games and Nerdook Productions to publish their mobile titles for the worldwide market.

== Games ==
- King's League: Odyssey (Publisher) - iOS, 2013
- Nuclear Outrun (Publisher) - iOS, 2013
- Castle Champions (Publisher) - iOS, 2013
- Ninja Fishing - iOS & Android, 2011
- Stickbound - iOS, 2010
- Wonder Island - PC, 2010
- Cate West: The Velvet Keys - PC, 2009
- Restaurant Rush - PC & Mobile, 2008
- Cate West: The Vanishing Files - PC, DS & Wii, 2008
- Burger Rush PC & Mobile, 2007
- Spacebound - PC, 2006

== Ninja Fishing ==
Gamenauts' 2011 game Ninja Fishing is a fishing game where the player fishes for sea creatures and treasure, and slices them with a katana, which rewards cash, upgrades, and collectible loot. The game has two sections of gameplay: during the fishing stage, the player tilts the screen to control a fishing hook as it descends, and, once successfully reeled in, swipes a finger around the screen to slice fish and treasure while avoiding dynamite, in the style of Fruit Ninja. Ninja Fishing was noted by Gamasutra as being similar to the game mechanics of Radical Fishing by Vlambeer. In 2013, Vlambeer published Ridiculous Fishing, with the highest rated reviews of the year.
