= Jukio Kallio =

Finnish composer

- Also known as: Kozilek, Kuabee, Kasimode
- Born: Japan
- Origin: Helsinki, Finland
- Genres: Electronic music; ambient; breakbeat
- Occupations: Composer, musician
- Years active: 2011–present
- Website: jukiokallio.com

Jukio Kallio is a Finnish video game composer known for creating the soundtracks to Minit, Fall Guys, Nuclear Throne and Luftrausers. He started making music in 2011 and created chiptune music on his own. He then met game developer and co-founder of former Dutch game studio Vlambeer, Jan Willem Nijman. Kallio collaborated with Nijman to develop and create the music to various titles made by Vlambeer. Kallio then collaborated with Daniel Hagström in 2020 to create the soundtrack to Fall Guys.

== Biography ==
Jukio Kallio was born in Japan to Finnish parents, and he is a musician and game developer based in Helsinki, Finland. His main musical genres consist of electronic music, ambient, breakbeat and chiptune.

== Career and chronology ==
Kallio started making music in 2011 under the name "Kozilek". His first releases were a short series of EP's called "DEMO" and "SECOND DEMO". Both of the EP's consisting of fast-paced chiptune music. He continued to release music on his Bandcamp page as an independent musician. He also remixed songs by Katy Perry, Safari Ducks and Black Sabbath. This was also around the time when Jukio met co-founder of Vlambeer, Jan Willem Nijman on an online chat room.

Kallio made his first game soundtrack for a game under development made by Vlambeer called Luftrausers in 2011. The soundtrack consisted of quirky chiptune sounds and it only had one single song, along with a remix by Jukio himself and an extended version of the original. The soundtrack was continued in 2014 and development for the game was complete. Kallio would later on create soundtracks for various other titles made by Vlambeer.

In 2013, he made the soundtrack for the game jam game Wasteland Kings. By 2015 this had become the full game Nuclear Throne, which featured a Western-inspired soundtrack by Kallio that was later released on vinyl.

Kallio continued making music for other small indie games such as The End (2014), Choice Chamber (2015), Evil Factory (2017) and other various titles.

In 2018, Kallio wrote the music for Minit, an adventure based RPG made by co-founder of Vlambeer, Jan Willem Nijman. The soundtrack would become one of Jukio's most popular soundtracks (at the time of releasing) and the game was nominated for several awards.

In June 2019, Jukio released his debut album, Kuabee Music. It was the first full-length studio album that he released. The album consisted of bright, vocal-driven house music along with many other styles and genres. The album runs for 46 minutes and has 9 tracks.

Following the release of Kuabee Music, In July 2020 Kallio collaborated with Daniel Hagstrom to create the soundtrack to Fall Guys, a game made by Mediatonic. The two would continue to write different pieces of music for each season of the game. In the 2020 PlayStation Blog the game won Best Independent Game - Platinum and Best Multiplayer Game - Gold. The game received "generally favourable" reviews, according to review aggregator website Metacritic. During Season 3 free for all in Spring 2023, Jukio stopped composing soundtracks for the game, leaving Daniel Hagstrom alone.

In September 2020, after the release of the Fall Guys soundtrack, Kallio released his second studio album Kuvankaunis. The album consists of acoustic sounds mixed with synthesizers and ambient-ish soundscapes along with realistic vocals. The album runs for 39 minutes and has 13 tracks.

In February 2021, Jukio teamed with Jan Willem Nijman to develop and revise the soundtrack for a racing styled spin-off of the 2018 title, Minit.

According to his website and Daniel Hagstrom's website, Jukio no longer works on the Fall Guys soundtrack since Season 9.

== Discography ==
=== Studio albums ===
- Kuabee Music (2019)
- Kuvankaunis (2020)
- Wonders of the kuj-Gozoddi (2024)

=== Soundtracks ===
- Luftrauser OST (2011)
- Wasteland Kings Official Soundtrack (2013)
- The End Official Soundtrack (2014)
- Distance (2014)
- LUFTRAUSERS OST (2014)
- Choice Chamber OST (2015)
- Scuber OST (2015)
- GUN GODZ OST (2015)
- Nuclear Throne OST (2015)
- Evil Factory OST (2017)
- Bleed 2 OST (2017)
- PixelJunk Monsters 2 Official Soundtrack (2018)
- MINIT OST (2018)
- Celeste B-Sides Original Soundtrack (2018)
- Fall Guys (Original Soundtrack) (2020–2023)
- DAVE THE DIVER (Original Soundtrack) (2023)

=== Extended plays ===
- DEMO (2011)
- SECOND DEMO (2011)
- Chill Bear EP (2011)
- Smashing The R (2011)
- We Are From A Fucking Scene EP (2011)
- Pluto EP (2012)
- SECRET EP (2014)
- So It Has Come To This EP (2016)
- Gardening (2017)
- Natsukashii EP (2020)
- Wonders Beneath The Troposphere (2024)

=== Singles ===
- "Girls <3 Kozilek" (2011)
- "Sword" (2011)
- "Low Fidelity SBBQ" (2012)
- "After The Fall" / "TXNO" (2012)
- "KZLK" (2013)
- "Sword II" (2013)
- "Johannesburg" (2014)
- "Natu Karasu" / "夏からす" (2015)
- "Mugen Games" (2016)
- "Roola Roola Song" (2016)
- "tape" (2016)
- "Meant to Bee" (2017)
- "You I" (2017)
- "Odyssey" (2017)
- "どこ？" / "doko?" (2017)
- "tape II" (2017)
- "The Tower" (2017)
- "Satellites" (2018)
- "Velka (Raw Live Acoustic Ver.)" (2018)
- "OK" (2018)
- "Rainy Day Vibes" (2018)
- "Kuun Laulut" (2018)
- "Mondo Museum" (2019)
- "Tuskin Maltan Enää Odottaa" (2019)
- "Aquariuum" (2019)
- "Noblivion" (2019)
- "Sä Oot Olemassa Remixes" (2020)
- "Kings and Queens of Wasteland Revisited" (2020)

=== Compilations ===
- From Soundcloud Vol. 1 (2015)
- Luftrausers Revisited (2020)

=== Remixes ===
- Katy Perry - E.T. (Kozilek Remix) (2011)
- Safari Ducks - Things We Like (Kozilek Remix) (2011)
- Black Sabbath - Paranoid (Kozilek Remix) (2012)
- Heathered Pearls ft. Outerbridge - Warm Air Estate (KASIMODE Remix) (2015)
- Wheels On The Bus (Kozilek Remix) (2016)
- Yoko Kanno feat. Yuuka Nanri - My Favourite Things (Kozilek Bootleg Remix) (2016)
- Go Dark - The Blazes (Kuabee Remix) (2016)
- Intervale - Mindset (Kasimode Rework) (2016)
- Kimotimo - Wired (Kuabee Remix) (2016)
- Temppeli (feat. Jurek) (Kuabee Remix) (2017)
- Celeste B-Sides OST - Reflection (Center of the Earth Mix) (2018)
- Lena Raine - Wake Up (Jukio Kallio Remix) (2020)

== Personal life ==
Kallio has a partner and child.
