= Ghost of Tsushima =

2020 video game

- Developer: Sucker Punch Productions (Note: Additional work by Japan Studio. Director's Cut for Windows developed by Nixxes Software.)
- Publisher: Sony Interactive Entertainment
- Directors: Nate Fox; Jason Connell
- Producer: Brian Fleming
- Programmer: Chris Zimmerman
- Artist: Jason Connell
- Writers: Ian Ryan; Liz Albl; Patrick Downs; Jordan Lemos
- Composers: Ilan Eshkeri; Shigeru Umebayashi
- Platforms: PlayStation 4; PlayStation 5; Windows
- Release: July 17, 2020: PlayStation 4; July 17, 2020; PlayStation 5; August 20, 2021; Windows; May 16, 2024
- Genre: Action-adventure
- Modes: Single-player, multiplayer

Ghost of Tsushima is a 2020 action-adventure game developed by Sucker Punch Productions and published by Sony Interactive Entertainment. The player controls Jin Sakai, a samurai on a quest to protect Tsushima Island during the first Mongol invasion of Japan. Jin must choose between following the warrior code to fight honorably, or by using practical but dishonorable methods of repelling the Mongols with minimal casualties. The game features a large open world which can be explored either on foot or on horseback. When facing enemies, the player can choose to engage in a direct confrontation using Jin's katana or to use stealth tactics to assassinate opponents. A multiplayer mode titled Ghost of Tsushima: Legends was released in October 2020 and made available separately in September 2021.

Sucker Punch began developing the game after the release of Infamous First Light in 2014, as the studio wanted to move on from the Infamous franchise to create a game with a heavy emphasis on melee combat. The studio collaborated with Japan Studio and visited Tsushima Island twice to ensure that the game was as culturally and historically authentic as possible. The team was heavily inspired by samurai cinema, particularly films directed by Akira Kurosawa, as well as the comic book series Usagi Yojimbo. The game's landscape and minimalistic art style were influenced by Shadow of the Colossus, and locations in the game were designed to be "the perfect photographer's dream". While the in-game landmass is similar in shape to Tsushima Island, the team did not intend to create a one-to-one recreation. Ilan Eshkeri and Shigeru Umebayashi composed the game's soundtrack.

Ghost of Tsushima was released for the PlayStation 4 in July 2020, and an expanded version for PlayStation 4 and PlayStation 5, subtitled Director's Cut and featuring the Iki Island expansion, was released in August 2021. A Windows version of Director's Cut, developed by Nixxes Software, was released in May 2024. The game received positive reviews from critics, who praised the melee combat, story, characters, performances, and music, though it received some criticism for its implementations of stealth gameplay and open world structure. It had sold over 13 million units by September 2024. It was nominated for several year-end awards, including Game of the Year at The Game Awards 2020 and the 24th Annual D.I.C.E. Awards. A sequel, Ghost of Yōtei, was released in October 2025. A film adaptation based on the main game and an anime based on Legends are also in development.

== Gameplay ==
In Ghost of Tsushima, the player can traverse the open world of Tsushima Island on horseback.

Ghost of Tsushima is an action-adventure video game played from a third-person perspective. The player has a variety of gameplay options to reach objectives they are given. They can engage in a "standoff", a direct confrontation with enemies using their katana, which can result in a series of fatal strikes against a number of different enemies. In combat, Jin can use different fighting stances to defeat specific types of enemies: "stone stance" for hostile swordsmen; "water stance" for shielded enemies; "wind stance" for spearmen; and "moon stance" for brutes. Eventually the player unlocks "ghost stance", which makes Jin invincible and allows him to kill enemies with a single hit for a limited period of time. To activate ghost stance, players must kill a number of enemies without taking any damage or "slaughter" a Mongol leader. The player needs to stagger enemies or land a successful parry to break their defense before attacking to deplete their health. The player has access to bows, which can fire multiple types of arrows. At certain points in the game, Jin must duel against non-playable characters (NPCs) who act as bosses with unique offensive tactics and attack animations. The game's highest difficulty is a more realistic mode in which the player and enemies do large amounts of damage to each other, with all non-boss fights ending in one or two successful attacks.

Alternatively, using stealth allows the player to evade enemies and strike them silently with Jin's tanto. As the player progresses in the game they can unlock chained assassination, which allows Jin to strike several enemies consecutively. To this end, Jin has a large arsenal of ghost weapons. These include firecrackers and wind chime bells to create distractions, smoke bombs to disorient alerted foes, kunai for striking multiple enemies, and explosives to kill groups of enemies. Players will eventually unlock a blowgun that allows them to shoot poison darts and causes victims to hallucinate and attack their peers. When the player restores Jin's health or uses special combat techniques, they deplete their "resolve", which is gained by performing feats of finesse such as assassinating or parrying an enemy.

The game features a large open world which can be explored with or without guidance based on wind direction. The three major regions of Tsushima are unlocked gradually as the player progresses, with Izuhara unlocked first, followed by Toyotama, and finally Kamiagata. Access to Iki Island is granted to those who purchased the DLC after entering Toyotama. Players travel to different parts of Tsushima on horseback and can use a grappling hook to access difficult-to-reach areas. As the player explores the world, yellow birds will guide Jin to locations of interest. These include hot springs which increase Jin's maximum health, "Bamboo Strikes" which increase Jin's maximum resolve upon completion, "Pillars of Honor" which hold additional cosmetic designs for Jin's weapons, and locations in which Jin will meditate and compose haiku, with the playing choosing each line. (Note: Waka in the Japanese version) By following torii gates and completing a platforming challenge, the player will find Shinto shrines that hold charms, which grant the player passive perks such as decreasing damage taken, reducing enemy detection speed, or increasing how much health is recovered when healing. Foxes will also lead Jin to Inari shrines, which increase the number of charms Jin can equip.

The game features side quests and NPCs with whom the player can interact. Players can also liberate Mongol-controlled villages and camps by eliminating all the enemies stationed in the area. Combat stances are unlocked after Jin observes or kills Mongol leaders. Completing side quests or helping NPCs grants players minor charms and gifts which can be collected at altars. In particular, completing "Mythic Tale" side quests will unlock unique armors and special combat techniques. Each armor set has different properties that provide various benefits during combat. Most sets of armor and clothing can be upgraded by collecting materials found in the game's world. Jin's appearance can also be further customized with masks, helmets and headbands.

=== Multiplayer ===
A multiplayer mode titled Ghost of Tsushima: Legends was released in late 2020. Players can access this mode from the menu or by reaching the NPC Gyozen the Storyteller in the single-player campaign, which will transport the player to Legends multiplayer lobby. Unlike the single-player campaign, Legends is based on Japanese mythology, featuring otherworldly realms and supernatural enemies. Legends features four classes: The samurai is the group's tank character who can deal and sustain a large amount of damage, the hunter is the group's sniper who specializes at using ranged weapons such as bows and arrows, the rōnin has the ability to summon dogs to aid combat and revives the group, and the assassin can deal a massive amount of damage with one attack and has the "Shadow Strike" ability which allows them to teleport short distances. As the player plays more matches and progresses in the game, they will earn "rank" which allows them to unlock class-specific upgrades and cosmetic items. A player's combat performance is dictated by the "Ki" level of their gear. The higher the player's overall "Ki" level, the more lethal they are, making them better at completing missions with higher difficulty levels. Legends features a variety of game modes:

- Story: In story mode, two players can complete narrated quests and objectives together. As the player progresses in the game, they will be able to unlock additional difficulty levels, new objectives, and rewards. In October 2020, the team introduced "The Tale of Iyo", a three-chapter raid mode described as the "culmination of the story" in Legends. Designed for experienced players, this mode supports a squad of four, stresses teamwork and coordination, and introduces puzzles that need to be solved cooperatively.
- Survival: In survival mode, four players can work together and fight against 15 waves of enemies. As the player's squad survives and completes objectives, they may gain access to powerful abilities which include summoning a spiritual bear to assist in combat and igniting enemies.
- Rivals: In rivals mode, two teams of two players each must compete against each other in survival mode. The objective is to progress faster and kill more enemies than the other team. As a team defeats enemies they earn "Magatama", an in-game currency which can be used to purchase perks and curses that disrupt the progress of the other team. Once a team has spent enough "Magatama", the final wave is unlocked and the team must complete it faster than the other team in order to win the match.

== Synopsis ==
=== Characters ===
The protagonist, Jin Sakai (Daisuke Tsuji / Kazuya Nakai), is a gokenin, the lord and sole remaining member of Clan Sakai. He is the nephew and ward of Shimura (Eric Steinberg / Akio Ōtsuka), lord of Clan Shimura and the jitō of Tsushima. He meets several friends and companions, including a thief named Yuna (Sumalee Montano / Yu Mizuno), her blacksmith brother Taka (Eddie Shin / Kappei Yamaguchi), a female warrior and widow named Lady Masako Adachi (Lauren Tom / Mabuki Ando), renowned kyūjutsu archer Sensei Sadanobu Ishikawa (François Chau / Shigeru Chiba), merchant and con artist Kenji (James Hiroyuki Liao / Setsuji Sato), Buddhist warrior monk Norio (Earl T. Kim / Mitsuaki Kanuka), Clan Sakai's elderly caretaker Yuriko (Karen Huie / Yuri Tabata), and Jin's childhood friend and leader of the infamous Straw Hat rōnin, Ryuzo (Leonard Wu / Youhei Tadano).

The main antagonist is the ruthless and cunning Khotun Khan of the Mongol Empire (Patrick Gallagher / Tsutomu Isobe), cousin of Kublai Khan and grandson of Genghis Khan.

=== Plot ===
In 1274, a Mongol fleet led by Khotun Khan invades the Japanese island of Tsushima. The jitō, Lord Shimura, and his nephew, Jin Sakai, lead an effort by the five ruling clans of the island - Shimura, Sakai, Adachi, Nagao, and Kikuchi - to repel the invaders as they land at Komoda Beach. However, the battle ends in disaster, with the samurai forces decimated by the superior weapons of the Mongols, Shimura captured, and Jin severely wounded and left for dead. He is found and revived by the scavenger Yuna, who informs him the whole island has fallen to the invaders. Jin storms the Khan's stronghold at Castle Kaneda to rescue Shimura but is defeated by the Khan in personal combat and thrown off the castle bridge.

Realizing that he cannot fight the Mongols in the way of the samurai, Jin learns assassination and guerilla warfare tactics from Yuna. He recruits Yuna, her blacksmith brother Taka, sake merchant and swindler Kenji, archer Sadanobu Ishikawa, female samurai Masako Adachi, and his mercenary friend Ryuzo along with Ryuzo's Straw Hat rōnin to form a resistance against Khotun. As Jin disrupts Mongol activities and liberates villages, the islanders revere him as "The Ghost," a samurai spirit that has risen against the Mongols.

Taka crafts a grappling hook for Jin to scale Castle Kaneda's walls undetected; catching the Mongol garrison by surprise, Jin leads his allies in a raid to seize the castle in Shimura's name. Ryuzo then betrays Jin, revealing that Khotun has promised food, money, and rewards to the Straw Hats in exchange for their loyalty. Jin bests Ryuzo and frees his uncle from captivity. Ryuzo then flees to Castle Shimura, where Khotun has transferred his command in preparation for a new military campaign. To replace the Straw Hats, Jin forms an alliance with the Buddhist warrior monks of Tsushima, led by Norio, and helps Shimura reconcile with his former enemies in Clan Yarikawa.

At Shimura's request, Jin ventures to the shanty town of Sanjo Bay to hire the smuggler Goro; with Shimura and Jin providing a distraction, Goro is able to escape Tsushima with a message to the shōgun, requesting military reinforcements and permission for Shimura to adopt Jin as heir to Clan Shimura. Finally, Jin is instructed to visit the decaying estate of Clan Sakai, where his childhood nanny and surrogate mother Yuriko meets him. Suffering from dementia, Yuriko helps Jin retrieve his family's armor and teaches him how to mix poison before dying peacefully.

Taka, eager to prove himself as a warrior, volunteers to assist Jin when Shimura orders him to infiltrate Mongol lines and capture Ryuzo for execution. Khotun ambushes them and has Jin restrained before offering Taka his freedom and whatever he wants if he kills his friend. When Taka instead tries to attack the Khan, he is swiftly overpowered and beheaded. Jin frees himself before the Mongols can deal with him and proceeds to kill the last of the Straw Hats with Yuna's help. He rejoins his uncle and the shogunate forces, taking part in an attack on Castle Shimura. The Khan and his men retreat to the keep and detonate explosives beneath the castle bridge, inflicting heavy casualties. Nevertheless, Shimura orders a fresh attack to take place the following day.

Disillusioned with his uncle's indifference to the lives of their allies, Jin infiltrates the keep to sneak poison into the Mongols' airag and kill Ryuzo. However, he again misses the Khan, who has retreated to another stronghold in the north. Despite the castle being taken without the samurai suffering any further losses, Shimura is furious with Jin for dishonoring the way of the samurai. Jin retorts by criticizing the ineffectiveness of Shimura's "honor" against the dishonorable Mongols. Knowing the shogunate will force him to have Jin put to death, Shimura urges him to use Yuna as a scapegoat, denounce the "Ghost" and his actions, and swear his loyalty. Jin refuses, and Shimura disowns him before ordering his arrest.

Jin's allies help him escape captivity, but his beloved horse is fatally shot by archers in the process. Jin travels north and learns the Mongols have stockpiled his poison, which they intend to use in their assault on the Japanese mainland. Before gathering his allies, claiming a new horse, and assaulting the Khan's final stronghold in Port Izumi, Jin leaves a note for Shimura in his castle asking him to join the effort under the shogunate's banner, which he does. With the bulk of the Mongol forces distracted, Jin infiltrates the port and kills the Khan on his flagship.

With Khotun Khan dead, the Mongol invasion loses momentum, and the tide turns in favor of the samurai. Shimura informs Jin the shogunate considers him a threat to the island's stability and status quo of obedience of the people to their leaders. With Clan Sakai legally disbanded, Jin is now an outlaw. The two men face each other in a duel, with Jin emerging victorious; the player can then either choose to kill Shimura, giving him a warrior's death, or spare his life. Regardless, Jin becomes an enemy of the shogunate but continues protecting Tsushima.

=== Iki Island ===
Jin comes across villagers who have been driven insane by a poison described as "sacred medicine." It was administered to them by a warband of Mongols whom Jin had never previously encountered: members of the Mongolian Eagle Tribe, led by Ankhsar "The Eagle" Khatun (Anzu Lawson / Urara Takano). Defeating the warband, Jin learns that the Eagle is engaged in a conquest of Iki Island, where his late father Kazumasa (Lee Shorten / Kissei Kumamoto) had once led an unsuccessful military campaign against the island's raiders. The samurai withdrew from the island after Kazumasa was ambushed and killed by the raiders. Jin was there during the campaign as a boy; he witnessed his father's death and still blames himself for not saving him. Because of this new threat to Tsushima, Jin sails to Iki Island to stop the Eagle and face his past.

A thunderstorm destroys Jin's boat, but he survives and arrives at Iki. Discovering the Eagle's base to be his father's former stronghold, Fort Sakai, Jin storms the fort but is subdued and captured by the Eagle's second-in-command, Khunbish. He and the Eagle force-feed Jin the "sacred medicine" in an attempt to convert him into one of the tribe's shamans. The poison causes Jin to frequently hallucinate visions of the Eagle, his deceased father, and many of his past failures. He is rescued by the raider Tenzo (Greg Chun / Mitsutoshi Shundo), who reluctantly accepts Jin's help and takes him to the raiders' leader, Fune.

Jin works with the raiders to weaken the Eagle's hold over the island, eventually retaking Fort Sakai and killing Khunbish. After fending off retaliation by the Eagle's forces, Jin hears Tenzo say, "May your death benefit all beings" to a dying Mongol — the same phrase a masked raider spoke to Kazumasa before killing him. Realizing that Tenzo killed his father, Jin nearly kills Tenzo before controlling his anger. He proposes re-enacting the ambush that killed his father to lure out the Eagle and ultimately kill her. Although suffering from near-continuous hallucinations, Jin overcomes the effects of the "sacred medicine" by acknowledging his father's faults and, at last, coming to terms with his death. Jin kills the Eagle in a duel, turning the tide in the raiders' favor. Jin and Tenzo forgive each other before parting ways.

== Development ==
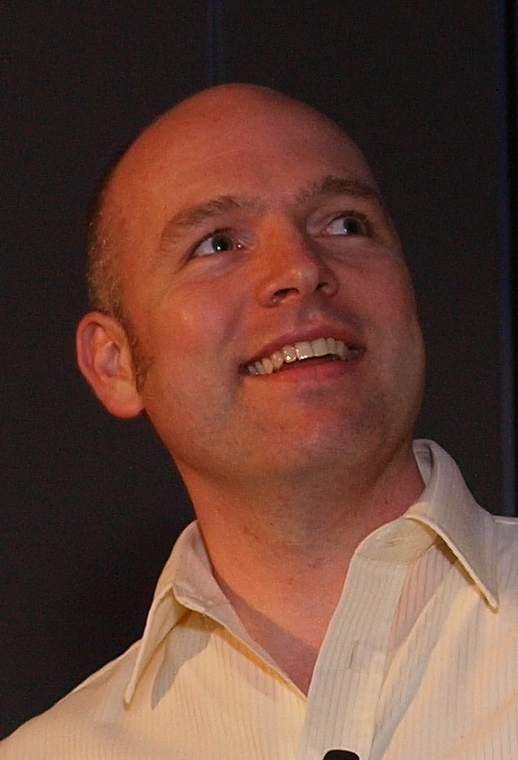
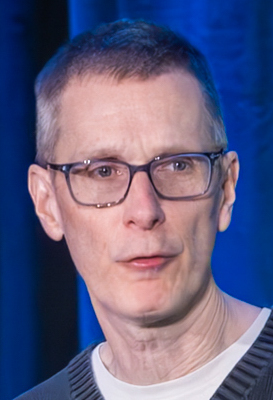
Ghost of Tsushima game director Nate Fox (left) and lead programmer Chris Zimmerman (right)

Ghost of Tsushima was developed by Sucker Punch Productions, which had a staff count of 160 at the time of development. Development of the game started in 2014 after the studio completed Infamous Second Son and its expansion, First Light. After working on the Infamous series for nine years, the studio believed that it was time to create something new. During the conceptualizing phase, the studio decided to create an open world game with a heavy emphasis on melee combat. Before deciding on the setting as feudal Japan, Sucker Punch considered various other settings and themes such as pirates, Scottish outlaw Rob Roy MacGregor, and The Three Musketeers. They later found a historical account of the Mongol invasion of Tsushima in 1274 and "the entire vision clicked into place." In 2020, a prototype for one of Sucker Punch's cancelled projects, Prophecy, was leaked. Set in a steampunk setting, Prophecy featured gameplay elements that were later carried over to Ghost of Tsushima. Sucker Punch worked on the game for six years, the longest ever for a game developed by the studio. The game's development was completed on June 22, 2020, with Sucker Punch confirming it had been declared gold, indicating it was being prepared for release. Nate Fox served as the game director, while Jason Connell was the creative director and art director.

=== Setting and narrative ===
The game is set during the first Mongol invasion of Japan in 1274, in which the Mongols first landed on Tsushima Island.

The Mongol invasion of Tsushima was chosen as the setting because the conflict was "easy for people to immediately conceptualize". As the Mongols at the time had the world's most advanced military, there were high stakes that required Jin, and therefore the player, to intervene. To ensure that the game's world was authentic, the team consulted Japan Studio, a fellow Sony game development team, early in the game's development. Japan Studio was excited about the idea and helped fly approximately 10 members of Sucker Punch to Japan and Tsushima Island for a 10- or 11-day guided tour with a historian. The team visited Japan twice to research Tsushima, once during the summer and again in November, during the anniversary of the invasion. Japan Studio also helped connect Sucker Punch with historians who the team consulted on the history of the invasion and local Japanese customs and traditions. Experts on Japanese dialects, religions during the 13th century, and the recreation of 13th century kanji were also consulted. The team invited Ide Ryusetsu and Kuwami Masakumo Shike, experts from a samurai martial arts school, to perform motion capture for the game and advise the team on sword-fighting. Seattle-based historical sword fighting expert David Ishimaru was also involved in the creation of the game's combat style. While the team initially considered introducing real-life historical figures into the game, they refrained from doing so after being told by experts that it would be insensitive. Jin's samurai armor and katana are not historically accurate, with his armor based on that of the Sengoku period during the 16th and 17th centuries. According to Chris Zimmerman, one of Sucker Punch's cofounders, samurai armor from the 13th century was "jarring looking" and did not align with players' expectations of what samurai armor would look like. The katana was included in the game since it was considered to be the "quintessential icon of samurai". One of the game's Japanese localizers also suggested to the developers that the game's "haiku" side quest be replaced with a less anachronistic waka side quest, but this was rejected based on the relative recognizability of haiku outside Japan.

One of the core objectives of the developers was to have strong and well-developed characters. Unlike the Infamous games, Ghost of Tsushima does not have a character karma system. Its absence allowed the team to tell a more cohesive story which better reflected Jin's transformation from an honorable samurai to a legendary warrior who must sacrifice everything he knows about honor and tradition in order to save Tsushima. Instead of the player being presented with binary choices as in Infamous, the world and characters react dynamically to Jin's choices in the story, either disapproving of his actions or encouraging them. The team believed that the story would be relatable, as they considered Jin's journey of relinquishing who he was to "become something new" a universal message that would resonate with modern-day players. Despite this, the player can still switch between the ghost style and samurai style seamlessly, as Jin's roots as a samurai do not change despite his transformation to become the ghost. While the game does not have a karma mechanic, the weather in Tsushima Island becomes more stormy when the player uses ghost techniques more frequently. The game's antagonist, Khotun Khan, does not undergo any transformative change. While he is a ruthless invader, he has a "bureaucratic aspect" as he attempts to conquer Tsushima Island with minimal bloodshed. Patrick Gallagher joined the cast in 2017 and prepared for the role as Khotun Khan by watching The Godfather and drawing on his experience portraying Attila the Hun in Night at the Museum.

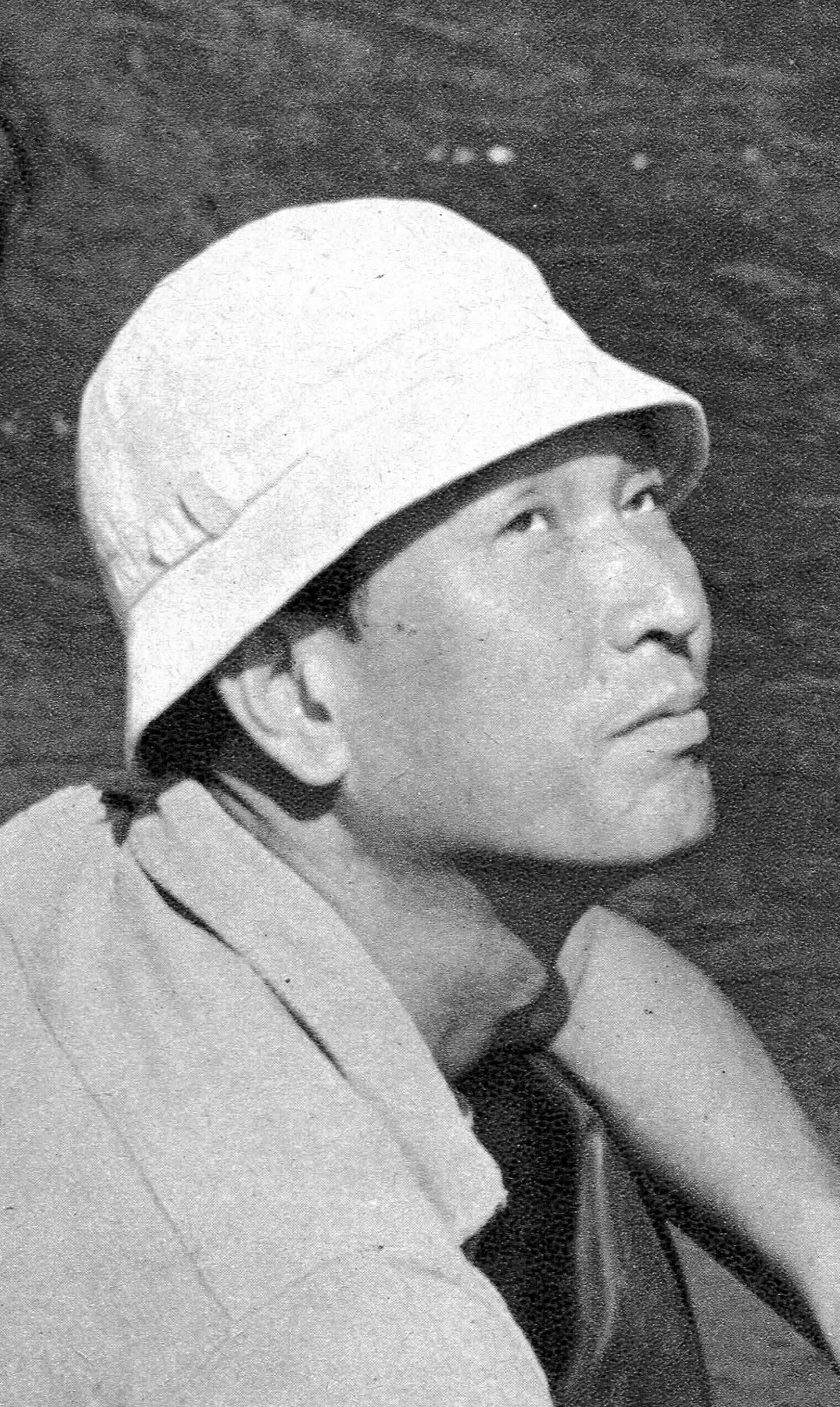
Films directed by Akira Kurosawa, including Seven Samurai, helped inspire the game.

While Fox said that the game was "entirely grounded in reality", the team took the liberty to create a fictional narrative. The initial real-world Mongol invasion was foiled by a hurricane, and the team acknowledged this with Jin's katana which is engraved with storm wind designs. 13 Assassins from Takashi Miike and films directed by Akira Kurosawa such as Seven Samurai, Sanjuro, Yojimbo, Red Beard, and Ran, served as major sources of inspiration for the team. The ending of Sanjuro directly inspired the game's "standoff" gameplay feature, in which a warrior must wait for their counterpart to make their first move and then kill them with one strike. The team tried to replicate the samurai code depicted in Seven Samurai in the game. Additionally, the team reached out to the Kurosawa Estate in order to use the director's name for their black-and-white gameplay mode. The comic book series Usagi Yojimbo, which features a soft-mannered rabbit samurai solving various problems for ordinary citizens, also influenced the team. Fox read this comic series when he was working on the Sly Cooper games. The surname of the game's protagonist was a tribute to Stan Sakai, the creator of Yojimbo. A number of video games also inspired the development team: many of the game's items were inspired by Tenchu, while the option to play as both the ghost and an honorable samurai was influenced by Onimusha: Warlords. Karateka and Red Dead Redemption were also cited as sources of inspiration.

=== Gameplay ===
Ghost of Tsushima was designed to be a challenging game. Jin is frequently outnumbered by his enemies, and basic enemies can kill Jin fairly quickly. The team hoped that through the game's difficult combat, players would grow more appreciative of minor incremental growth. Fox stated that the three pillars of the game's combat were "mud, blood, and steel". The team wanted the game to be grounded, visceral and challenging. Fox added that they strove to keep sword fights deadly so that each combat encounter would be reminiscent of those seen in samurai movies.

The combat system was the most difficult feature to implement in Ghost of Tsushima, as the team had to build multiple versions of it and modified its design frequently during the game's development. Early playtesters complained that the enemies were "sword sponge" (i.e., they absorbed a large amount of damage before they died), breaking immersion. The team responded to this criticism by adding "hit points" and "armor points", but ultimately decided that all enemies would be defeated within a certain number of hits. Health of enemies would not change regardless of the selected difficulty. Instead, enemies would adopt more defensive tactics such as parrying and blocking at higher difficulties. Early prototypes of this design was described as overkill, as enemies would deflect all attacks. As a result, the stagger system, which allowed players to break their enemies' defenses while remaining offensive, was introduced. The team allowed combat to take longer in the game's 1v1 duels, as players likely expected them to be boss fights and these encounters could not end too quickly. The ghost weapons were designed to be "exceedingly lethal" and generally more effective than the samurai weapons. This further complemented the story and Jin's emotional dilemma between maintaining samurai honor and saving the island through dishonorable means. While players may enjoy playing the ghost path, the narrative would remind them that these techniques are loathed. Fox compared the Mongol enemies to packs of wolves which attacked the players from all sides. He further likened the game's combat to a dance, in which the player must seamlessly "weave between Mongol swords".

One of the goals of the studio was to create a "beautiful, serene, and nature-filled open world feudal Japan". During the game's reveal at Paris Game Week, Connell went off the script to announce that the game would not feature any waypoint mechanics and that the game's exploration would be primarily driven by the player's curiosity. This announcement was unexpected to the team, and they had to add additional features in order to fulfill Connell's promise. Sucker Punch strived to ensure that the game had moments of calm in which players can slow down and be fully immersed in the world. This is achieved through having a minimalistic head-up display, nature-guided objectives, and relaxing open world activities that are not tied to progression or the overarching story. Side-quests in the game were likened to an anthology of stories, and Jin meets characters who are simply trying to survive the brutality of war. Connell added that ultimately, the studio wanted players to get lost in the team's recreation of feudal Japan.

=== Art and world design ===
Bold colors were used when the team was creating different parts of Tsushima Island.

The team decided early on that "wind blowing around literally everything in the world" would be Ghost of Tsushima's "visual calling card". This was inspired by early Chanbara samurai films, which often feature movement in the background in the form of dust, smoke and wind. The team took one and a half years to ensure that foliage and other objects would react properly to wind. The team initially added icons and a compass to the game to aid the player's navigation, but they realized they spent an excessive amount of time looking at them and ignored the in-game world itself. The team then decided to use wind to guide players to their objectives, forcing the player to observe the world. The team took about a week to create the feature and spent roughly another year further refining it. While implementing the feature, they were inspired by Shadow of the Colossus, in which the player is shown the direction of their objectives when they hold up their sword. Connell added that "nature is a symbol for Jin's home", and guidance using wind served as an important tool for players to "connect" with Jin's home. According to Fleming, guiding winds also evoked a feeling that "nature herself is on [the player's] side". This aligned with real-world history as well, as Mongol forces were decimated by a typhoon that was seen by the Japanese as "divine wind" sent to protect their home. Many of the game's particle effects and systems were imported from previous Infamous games.

"The fern forest has tons of ferns. Not a fern and a bush and two trees, it's just "Let's flood it with ferns first, like make that be the big read." And I think that that whether it's pampas grass, or ferns, or gingko trees, or spider lilies, or beech trees—this is a theme we went back to countless times."

— Jason Connell, creative director and art director

The team did not intend to create a one-to-one recreation of Tsushima Island. While the in-game landmass is geographically the same shape as that of Tsushima Island, Sucker Punch took the liberty of creating the game's individual biomes, ensuring that each region is artistically distinct. This allowed the team to create a unique identity for each area, allowing players to recognize them easily even when viewed from afar. This is achieved through the use of bold and vibrant colors when modelling nature. The team also chose the dominant foliage in each area and significantly exaggerated its presence, creating "little pockets of massive boldness and beauty". For instance, the team focused on orange and yellow hues for the trees when they were creating the Golden Forest, one of the game's locations, instead of including all the types of trees that would realistically grow there. Connell described these locations as one's imagination of what an area would look like and "the perfect photographer's dream". Fox added that the landscape featured in the in-game island is more diverse than its real-world counterpart, as the team also incorporated the aesthetics of mainland Japan when they were recreating Tsushima Island.

According to Fleming, "everything in Japan tends to celebrate negative space". As a result, the team pushed for simplicity from the design of the game's architecture and interiors to the minimalistic HUD. Connell added that the art and environment teams had a hard time switching to Ghost of Tsushima after working for nine years on the Infamous games, which features a "punk rock" visual style. Shadow of the Colossus and The Legend of Zelda: Breath of the Wild both inspired the game's minimalistic landscape and aesthetic, though the team strived to have more photorealistic visuals to highlight the game's picturesque setting. Much of the game was designed to be "serene" and "tranquil" so that it more sharply contrasted with moments of violence throughout the game's combat and story. The game includes Kurosawa mode, a black-and-white filter with film grain and adjusted audio, created to honor the legendary Akira Kurosawa and his influential samurai films. To design this mode, the team playtested the game repeatedly using features commonly found in accessibility modes designed for colorblind individuals.

Jin's armors were heavily inspired by the armor designs of the Kamakura and Heian periods. These armors were designed to be bulky and colorful, radiating "a sense of regality" while contrasting with the darker and more agile ghost outfit. The team intentionally avoided the traditional assassin design in which characters are dressed in all-black fully-cloth clothing for the ghost outfit in order to make it appear more realistic. Parts of some outfits, such as capes and tassels, respond to the wind, further connecting the player and Jin to the game's world. Peasant recruits wear leftover armor and have a more ragtag appearance than typical samurai characters. Peasants frequently wear clothes with geometric patterns that reflect their origins. For instance, people living on Northern Tsushima wear clothes with snowflake patterns. The game's antagonist, Khotun Khan, has two armors, one of which is completely void of color and angular in shape to further signify his oppression and brutality.

=== Audio and music ===
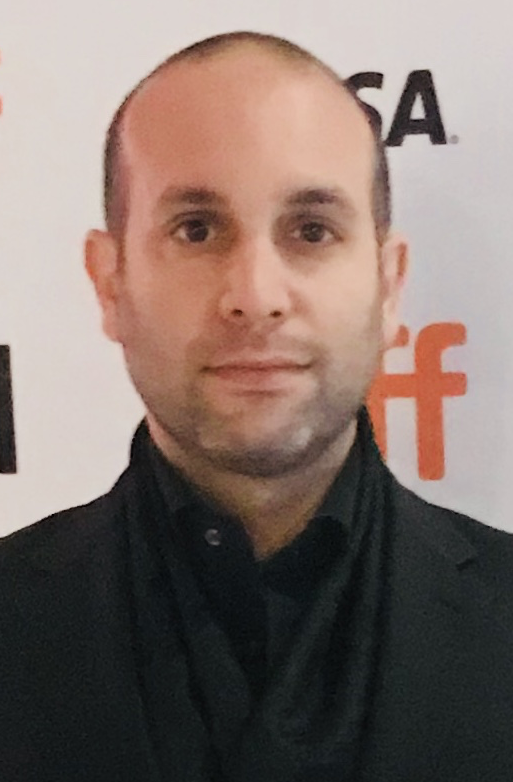
Ilan Eshkeri

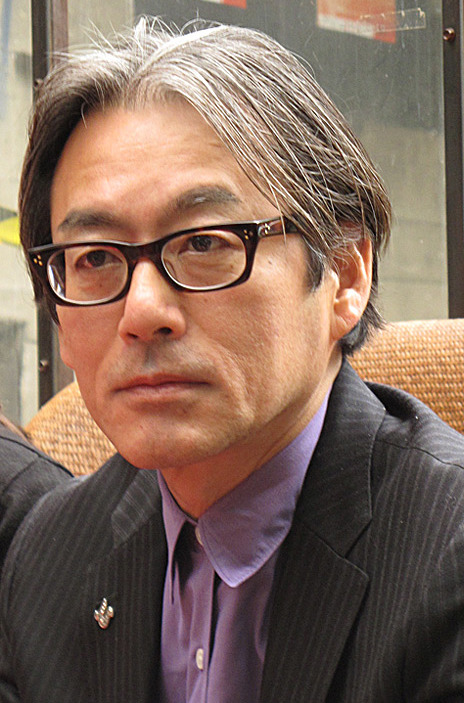
Shigeru Umebayashi

Eshkeri composed much of the game's music, with Umebayashi responsible for the exploration music.

Brad Meyer served as the game's audio lead. To record the sound of sword fighting, the team used sword blanks previously used in recording sessions for God of War, which was developed by Santa Monica Studio, another Sony developer. According to Meyer, the team spent a lot of time "scraping them against each other, clanging them together, swinging them, suspending them from the ceiling and spinning them around" in order to record interesting sounds. The team also used them to cut through fruits, vegetables, and cloth to create the sound of a sword cutting through a human body. Combat sounds are deemphasized when the player is exploring and not engaged in combat. Jin's wind chimes were recorded using a Japanese fūrin. The black-naped oriole was chosen as the game's guide bird because it can be found in Japan and Meyer had the opportunity to record its sound during a vacation in Sri Lanka in 2018. The audio and music system was initially based on that of Infamous Second Son, in which combat music will gradually intensify over three different states. However, due to additional gameplay elements found in Ghost of Tsushima such as ghost stance and standoff, the team was required to create additional states for the combat music.

British composer Ilan Eshkeri wrote the game's music. Eshkeri extensively researched Japanese musical styles in the 13th century, including Gagaku, Shōmyō Buddhist chanting, and the biwa hōshi. A group of consultants also helped translate lyrics written in English to Japanese. Eshkeri was approached by the team after they listened to his work on Coriolanus. The team was particularly impressed with how he was able to recreate Japanese music using western instruments. Eshkeri was initially hesitant since he was not familiar with scoring music for fighting games, but he agreed after being briefed on the game's narrative. Eshkeri learned Japanese scales, played Japanese instruments, and listened to music from Tsushima Island. He also met with Junko Ueda, one of the few surviving musicians who can play a biwa, an instrument used by samurai in the past. It was used in the recording of "The Way of the Ghost", Jin's personal theme. Several ancient Japanese melodies, including The Tale of the Heike, were also quoted and rearranged by Eshkeri. However, he deliberately avoided listening to the musical scores of Kurosawa's films in order to keep his music original. The most difficult track for Eshkeri to write was the one for the final battle, as the track needed to be simultaneously action-packed and emotional. Eshkeri ultimately wrote double the amount of music that was actually needed. The game also features five musical suites by Japanese composer Shigeru Umebayashi, who was responsible for creating the game's exploration music. The full soundtrack of the game was released on July 17, 2020. A four-track remix EP titled "Sound of the Storm – Ghost of Tsushima Soundtrack: Reimagined" features contributions from TOKiMONSTA, Tycho, The Glitch Mob and Alessandro Cortini. It was released on July 10, 2022, via Milan Records.

== Release ==
Ghost of Tsushima's marketing campaign began in October 2017 when a trailer was shown at Sony Interactive Entertainment's Paris Games Week press conference. Sony opted not to announce the title too early since many of the game's systems were tentative and subject to change. A gameplay demo was shown at E3 2018 along with a live shakuhachi performance by Cornelius Boots. The game was released for PlayStation 4 on July 17, 2020, having been delayed from its original June 26 release date due to the COVID-19 pandemic. Sucker Punch announced four editions: standard, digital deluxe, special, and a collector's edition. Different editions came bundled with different collector's items as well as in-game items, equipment, and unlocked abilities, in addition to a bonus for pre-ordering the game. Sony also partnered with the Tourism Board of Tsushima Island and the Nagasaki Prefecture to launch a website that educates readers on the history and culture of the real-life Island. Art prints, produced by Cook & Becker, were released in November 2020.

A multiplayer expansion titled Ghost of Tsushima: Legends, was released on October 16, 2020, alongside the addition of a new game plus feature to the base game. Unlike the main game, Legends features prominent supernatural elements drawn from Japanese mythology. While Legends was introduced as a post-launch update, Sucker Punch decided early on that some form of cooperative gameplay would be included in the final game. Development of the mode started in 2016, and the studio experimented for six months to a year when designing the multiplayer mode. The team ultimately chose supernatural elements as the focal point of Legends, which gave the team more creative freedom when they were designing the characters and their abilities. A storyteller character was introduced to tie the mode thematically back to Jin's journey and the world of Tsushima. According to Darren Bridge, the senior game designer leading Legends's development, the visual style of Legends was unrefined until the final nine months of the expansion's development. The final boss fight was also completed relatively late in the game's development, with the team once considering delaying its addition or completely removing it from the game. In December 2020, Legends introduced four character outfits based on other PlayStation franchises: Bloodborne, God of War, Horizon Zero Dawn, and Shadow of the Colossus. Legends received a standalone release on September 3, 2021, and was one of the free games offered to PlayStation Plus subscribers in March 2022.

Sucker Punch released Ghost of Tsushima: Director's Cut on August 20, 2021, for both PlayStation 4 and PlayStation 5. The PlayStation 5 version includes exclusive features such as full Japanese lip sync, haptic feedback and adaptive trigger support, 3D audio support, dynamic 4K resolution, and decreased loading times. The Director's cut also includes an expansion in which Jin visits Iki Island to stop a Mongol tribe led by a shaman named Ankhsar Khatun. The size of Iki Island is similar to Act One of the main game, and players can access the island once they have reached Act Two of the main story. Iki Island is drastically different from Tsushima Island as it is mostly populated with bandit, raider, and criminal NPCs. When designing Iki Island, the team continued to use bold colors, though it used a different color palette so that players could easily differentiate between it and the main Tsushima Island. According to the team, the story also delves into Jin's past and the history of Clan Sakai, exploring a different viewpoint of the Mongol invasion. Iki Island also added new combat skills, such as the ability for the player's horse to charge at enemies, new side quests and open world activities including visiting animal sanctuaries where Jin can pet various animals, and music composed by Chad Cannon and Bill Hemstapat, both of whom had previously worked with Umebayashi for the arrangement and orchestration of "Tsushima's suite". An armor set inspired by Aloy from Horizon Forbidden West was added to Director's Cut in February 2022. In April 2022, Sucker Punch announced that they have stopped working on further patches and updates for both the main game and Legends, as the studio shifted developmental resources to other projects.

Nixxes Software developed the PC version of the game, which was released on May 16, 2024. On May 11, 2024, it was reported that the Steam listing for the game had been delisted from 177 territories due to the unavailability of PlayStation Network in those regions. This came after widespread criticism following a similar occurrence with Helldivers 2, another PlayStation Studios title that was released on PC. Helldivers 2 had come under controversy due to Sony enforcing PlayStation Network account linking, a statement the company would backtrack on. Sucker Punch had previously clarified that PlayStation Network account linking was mandatory only for Ghost of Tsushima's multiplayer component, and that single-player would not be affected. The regional lockout was lifted on October 28, 2025, after a patch for the game that separated Legends into free downloadable content was made available; while the Legends unlock was initially region-locked, it was eventually made region-free after.

Sony announced in September 2025 that players who earn the Platinum Trophy by December 2025 can unlock special merchandise for purchase. The merchandise includes a pin and t-shirt.

== Reception ==
=== Critical reception ===
Reception

Aggregate scores
Aggregator	Score
Metacritic	(PS4) 83/100 (PS5) 87/100 (PC) 89/100
OpenCritic	88% recommend

Review scores
Publication	Score
Destructoid	9.5/10
Famitsu	40/40
Game Informer	9.5/10
GameSpot	7/10
GamesRadar+	4.5/5
IGN	9/10
The Guardian	3/5
USgamer	4/5
VentureBeat	85/100
VG247	3/5

Ghost of Tsushima received "generally favorable" reviews from critics, according to review aggregator website Metacritic. Fellow review aggregator OpenCritic assessed that the game received "mighty" approval, being recommended by 88% of critics. It received a combined 40/40 score from four editors of the Japanese video game magazine Famitsu, the third Western-developed game to do so. (Note: The first two Western-developed games to receive a 40/40 score from Famitsu were The Elder Scrolls V: Skyrim (2011) and Grand Theft Auto V (2013).) It also received praise from Toshihiro Nagoshi, the director of the Yakuza series, who applauded Jin as the game's protagonist, adding that Japanese studios were unlikely to greenlight a game starring a middle-aged man due to marketing reasons.

The story received a generally positive reception. Matt Miller from Game Informer wrote that Ghost of Tsushima offered "a tale about the contradictory ideals of honor and revenge", praising the side quests for offering a somber contemplation on the brutality of war and how it affects the everyday life of ordinary peasants. IGN's Mitchell Saltzman praised Tsuji and Gallagher's performances. He described Jin's struggles as "compelling", and called Khan a memorable antagonist whose "soft intensity" is "oddly calming despite his terrifying intentions". Critics applauded the game's cast of side characters, adding that their personal stories impacted the overall story and Jin's own character development. The side quests, however, were largely considered to be repetitive and forgettable. Eurogamer's Chris Tapsell compared them unfavorably to The Witcher 3: Wild Hunt and considered them to be an "afterthought", criticizing their basic framework and inadequate rewards for completion. While the performance of the voice cast was praised, several reviewers noted the lack of lip-syncing for the Japanese audio, which was later rectified in the Director's Cut version of the game. Edmond Tran, writing for GameSpot, noted that the characters have a "noticeable lack of bodily expression", hindering the delivery of certain emotional scenes, but remarked that the emotional impact of these scenes was frequently heightened by the game's musical score and cinematography. In a mixed review, Keza MacDonald of The Guardian felt that the story lacked intrigue and wrote that Ghost of Tsushima adhered "so closely to the tropes and storylines of classic samurai fiction that it sometimes forgets to have a personality of its own".

Critics generally praised the gameplay. Miller enjoyed the variety in enemies and added that combat remained challenging and riveting even when the player was approaching the end of the game. He felt that the game's two playstyles were both satisfying, and lauded Sucker Punch for allowing players to freely choose their approaches to objectives and missions. Writing for GamesRadar, Rachel Weber agreed that the game was challenging. She added that it "flowed like a dance" and remarked that the combat had a large emphasis on the timing of attacks and parries. Standoffs were particularly praised for evoking the feelings of Japanese samurai movies. Saltzman appreciated the combat system and compared it to the early Assassin's Creed games, the Batman Arkham series, and Sekiro: Shadows Die Twice. He also enjoyed the progression system, as players are not required to grind for experience to level up and difficulty does not suddenly ramp up as the player progresses. Mike Williams from USgamer felt that combat was "decent", but the camera angle and the lack of a lock-on system mean that players cannot easily control the battlefield as opponents swarm in on Jin from various directions with different styles of attacks. Several critics were disappointed by the stealth gameplay as they felt it was too rudimentary. Both Williams and Saltzman noted that the artificial intelligence was inadequate.

Weber described the game's world as a "work of art", Miller described it as a "painter's vision of feudal Japan", and Saltzmann wrote that its visual landscape was one of the best ever for an open world game. Critics particularly praised how the game used elements of nature like wind and birds to guide players to their objectives, with Williams describing the guiding wind system as a "major innovation". Tran wrote that guiding wind encouraged players to explore the game world and made them more likely to "follow winding roads around mountains and along river bank" instead of simply choosing the most direct route. Critics also enjoyed the way that the game offered moments of relief and calmness. Miller liked the world design for encouraging players to explore, but lamented that some of the platforming sessions were too static and limiting. Chris Carter, writing for Destructoid, enjoyed some of the open world activities, singling out haiku composition and bathing in hotsprings as examples of unique optional content; conversely, Tapsell was disappointed by the game's open world structure and found it to be unimaginative and outdated, adding that the side content and points of interest lacked variety and a sense of mystery. Andrew Webster from The Verge felt that these repetitive open world activities undermined the game's innovative ideas. Kirk McKeand from VG247 also criticized the game's open world activities for hindering the pacing of the story and deemed the structure of some quests "archaic".

Scholar Anthon Cederwall noted that the game had integrated Shinto religious beliefs and practice into the gameplay systems. Torii gates mark the boundary between the sacred and the profane in Shinto belief, and the use of them in game help signal to the player an entry into a "spiritually significant space" leading to an upgrade shrine. The foxes that lead to the inari shrines are messengers of the Kami Inari, a deity that is connected to prosperity, agriculture, and protection. Scholars have also discussed the game's influence on interest in the real Tsushima Island. A thesis paper done by Asha Bardon argues that the game’s detailed recreation of Tsushima, its religious heritage, and its historical setting actually promotes the island, encourages greater post pandemic tourism, and helps increase interest in Japan’s history and culture. Fox and Connell were named as tourism ambassadors to Tsushima Island in March 2021 for spreading "the name and history of Tsushima through their works". The game has contributed to the restoration of Watazumi Shrine on Tsushima Island. After a typhoon damaged it in 2020, the game's community came together and created a crowdfunding campaign raising over 27 million yen for repairs.

=== Sales ===
Ghost of Tsushima was the best-selling physical game in its debut week of release in the United Kingdom lasting three weeks and sold 373,473 units in the country by the end of 2020. It was also the best-selling physical game in July 2020 in the US and became Sucker Punch's fastest-selling game there. The game also topped the download charts in both Europe and the United States. It went on to become the seventh-best-selling game of 2020 in the US. The Director's Cut version was the best-selling game in the UK in its week of release and the second-best-selling game in the United States in August 2021 behind Madden NFL 22. With the release of the PC version, the game topped the U.S. software sales chart in May 2024.

In Japan, Ghost of Tsushima was also the best-selling game during its debut week, with 212,915 units being sold. The game was out of stock in some stores in Japan during its launch month. The game remained in the top 30 best-selling video games in Japan for more than 15 consecutive weeks, totaling over 412,000 units sold. It had the second-highest lifetime sales for a Sony first-party video game in Japan, only behind Marvel's Spider-Man. In May 2023, Sony confirmed that the game had sold over 1 million units in Japan.

Worldwide, Ghost of Tsushima sold over 2.4 million units in its first 3 days of sales, making it the PlayStation 4's fastest-selling first-party original IP debut. In November 2020, It was reported that the game had sold over 5 million units. By July 2022, it had sold 9.73 million units. In September 2024, Sucker Punch announced that it had sold over 13 million units. According to court documents filed by Sony in the Microsoft/Activision merger, the game was highly profitable. Against a reported budget of $60 million, it had generated $397 million in total revenue as of the filing in 2023.

=== Awards ===
In addition to the following awards, the game was selected by PlayStation Official Magazine – UK and Hardcore Gamer as their Game of the Year.

Year	Award	Category	Result	Ref.
2020	Golden Joystick Awards	PlayStation Game of the Year	Nominated	
2020	Golden Joystick Awards	Best Audio	Nominated	
2020	Golden Joystick Awards	Best Storytelling	Nominated	
2020	Golden Joystick Awards	Best Visual Design	Nominated	
2020	Golden Joystick Awards	Studio of the Year	Nominated	
2020	The Game Awards 2020	Game of the Year	Nominated	
2020	The Game Awards 2020	Best Game Direction	Nominated	
2020	The Game Awards 2020	Best Art Direction	Won	
2020	The Game Awards 2020	Best Narrative	Nominated	
2020	The Game Awards 2020	Best Performance (Tsuji as Jin Sakai)	Nominated	
2020	The Game Awards 2020	Best Audio Design	Nominated	
2020	The Game Awards 2020	Best Action/Adventure Game	Nominated	
2020	The Game Awards 2020	Player's Voice	Won	
2020	Titanium Awards	Best Narrative Design	Nominated	
2020	Titanium Awards	Best Art Design	Nominated	
2021	10th New York Game Awards	Tin Pan Alley Award for Best Music in a Game	Nominated	
2021	10th New York Game Awards	Statue of Liberty Award for Best World	Won	
2021	24th Annual D.I.C.E. Awards	Game of the Year	Nominated	
2021	24th Annual D.I.C.E. Awards	Adventure Game of the Year	Won	
2021	24th Annual D.I.C.E. Awards	Online Game of the Year	Nominated	
2021	24th Annual D.I.C.E. Awards	Outstanding Achievement in Game Direction	Nominated	
2021	24th Annual D.I.C.E. Awards	Outstanding Achievement in Game Design	Nominated	
2021	24th Annual D.I.C.E. Awards	Outstanding Achievement in Art Direction	Won	
2021	24th Annual D.I.C.E. Awards	Outstanding Achievement in Audio Design	Won	
2021	24th Annual D.I.C.E. Awards	Outstanding Achievement in Original Music Composition	Won	
2021	24th Annual D.I.C.E. Awards	Outstanding Achievement in Story	Nominated	
2021	24th Annual D.I.C.E. Awards	Outstanding Technical Achievement	Nominated	
2021	SXSW Gaming Awards 2021	Video Game of the Year	Nominated	
2021	SXSW Gaming Awards 2021	Excellence in Narrative	Nominated	
2021	SXSW Gaming Awards 2021	Excellence in Animation, Art, & Visual Achievement	Won	
2021	SXSW Gaming Awards 2021	Excellence in Technical Achievement	Nominated	
2021	Visual Effects Society Awards	Outstanding Virtual Cinematography in a CG Project	Nominated	
2021	Visual Effects Society Awards	Outstanding Visual Effects in a Real-Time Project	Won	
2021	17th British Academy Games Awards	Artistic Achievement	Nominated	
2021	17th British Academy Games Awards	Audio Achievement	Won	
2021	17th British Academy Games Awards	Best Game	Nominated	
2021	17th British Academy Games Awards	Game Design	Nominated	
2021	17th British Academy Games Awards	Multiplayer	Nominated	
2021	17th British Academy Games Awards	Music	Nominated	
2021	17th British Academy Games Awards	Narrative	Nominated	
2021	17th British Academy Games Awards	Original Property	Nominated	
2021	17th British Academy Games Awards	Performer in a Leading Role (Tsuji as Jin Sakai)	Nominated	
2021	17th British Academy Games Awards	Performer in a Supporting Role (Gallagher as Khotun Khan)	Nominated	
2021	17th British Academy Games Awards	EE Game of the Year	Nominated	
2021	21st Game Developers Choice Awards	Game of the Year	Nominated	
2021	21st Game Developers Choice Awards	Best Audio	Nominated	
2021	21st Game Developers Choice Awards	Best Design	Nominated	
2021	21st Game Developers Choice Awards	Best Narrative	Nominated	
2021	21st Game Developers Choice Awards	Best Technology	Nominated	
2021	21st Game Developers Choice Awards	Best Visual Art	Won	
2021	Japan Game Awards 2021	Game Designers Award	Runner-up	
2021	Japan Game Awards 2021	Award for Excellence	Won	
2021	Japan Game Awards 2021	Grand Prize	Won	
2021	Golden Joystick Awards 2021	Best Game Expansion (Iki Island)	Won	
2024	2024 Steam Awards	Best Game You Suck At Award	Nominated	
2024	2024 Steam Awards	Outstanding Story-Rich Game Award	Nominated	

== Adaptations ==
On March 25, 2021, Sony Pictures and PlayStation Productions announced the development of a film adaptation of the game, directed by Chad Stahelski. The film will be produced by Stahelski, Alex Young, and Jason Spitz of 87Eleven Entertainment alongside Asad Qizilbash and Carter Swan of PlayStation Productions. Sucker Punch will serve as executive producers, with Peter Kang overseeing production on the studio's behalf. On April 12, 2022, Takashi Doscher was brought on to write the screenplay. The film is in development.

Jin Sakai made a cameo in episode 15 of the Secret Level TV series.

In January 2025, Sony announced an anime inspired by the game's multiplayer mode, titled Ghost of Tsushima: Legends. It is being produced by Kamikaze Douga in partnership with Hayate Inc., Sony Music and PlayStation Productions and directed by Takanobu Mizuno, with series composition by Gen Urobuchi; it is scheduled to be released on Crunchyroll in 2028, after being delayed from 2027.

== Sequel ==
Ghost of Yōtei, a sequel to Ghost of Tsushima, was released for the PlayStation 5 on October 2, 2025. The story takes place around Mount Yōtei on Japan's Hokkaido island in 1603, following the female warrior Atsu.
