= Ridiculous Fishing =

2013 video game

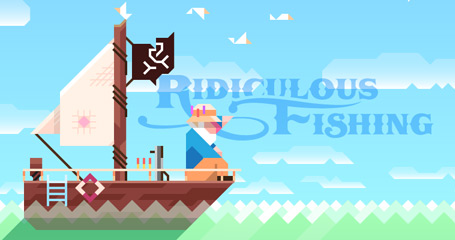
- Developer: Vlambeer
- Publisher: Vlambeer
- Producer: Rami Ismail
- Designer: Jan Willem Nijman
- Programmer: Zach Gage
- Artist: Greg Wohlwend
- Composer: Eirik Suhrke
- Series: Ridiculous Fishing
- Platforms: iOS, Android, Windows Phone
- Release: iOS; March 13, 2013; Android; November 19, 2013; Windows Phone; May 21, 2014
- Genre: Action
- Mode: Single-player

Ridiculous Fishing is a fishing video game developed and published by Vlambeer. In the game, players use motion and touch controls to catch fish and subsequently shoot them out of the sky for cash. The game was released for iOS on March 13, 2013, then later that year for Android.

Players cast a fishing line into the ocean and use motion controls to avoid fish as the hook sinks and to catch as many fish as possible as the reel retracts. Players then touch the screen to shoot fish out of the sky for money that can be spent on upgrades.

The game was first released as a Flash game Radical Fishing with the same basic mechanics. A year after Vlambeer began their iOS development, Gamenauts released Ninja Fishing, a clone of the game. The team worked on other games and spoke publicly about the situation to a standing ovation at the 2012 Game Developers Conference before resolving to scrap the majority of their work and finish the game. Artist Greg Wohlwend moved in with iOS developer Zach Gage to work 14-hour days on the game.

Ridiculous Fishing received "near-universal perfect scores" at launch—what review score aggregator Metacritic describes as "universal acclaim". It won an Apple's 2013 Design Award and was their iPhone game of the year, and is considered one of the best mobile games of all time. Reviewers noted Vlambeer's struggle against the copy of their game and praised the game's balance and both visual and game design. A 3D remaster of the game developed by KO_OP, titled Ridiculous Fishing EX, was released on Apple Arcade in July 2023, 3 years after Vlambeer went defunct. As of December 10, 2025, the Android version is no longer downloadable from the Google Play store.

== Gameplay ==
The player fishes in pursuit of fame as a fisherman named Billy. The game mechanics consist of three minigames: casting the fishing line, catching fish, and shooting the fish in the air. The player casts the line and tilts the device to avoid the fish as the hook sinks. Upon hooking a fish, the hook ascends and the player tilts the device to catch as many fish as possible en route to the surface. Above water, the fish are launched into the air, and the player taps the screen to shoot the fish out of the sky to earn money before they fall into the water. The fish differ in characteristics including swim pattern and the number of shots required. Shooting jellyfish detracts from the total income. There are four stages, each with its own visual and audio theme and rare fish, and an endless mode where players can work towards the highest score. Earnings can be spent in a store towards persistent upgrades such as longer fishing line length, invulnerable drills, frivolous hats, bigger guns, chainsaw lures, a hair dryer and toaster (to zap inadvertent catches), fuel for the chainsaw, and a necktie for greater income. There is also a Fish-o-pedia in Billy's smartphone that gives gameplay hints and tracks stats such as fish caught, which is the progress for unlocking new levels. There are no in-app purchases.

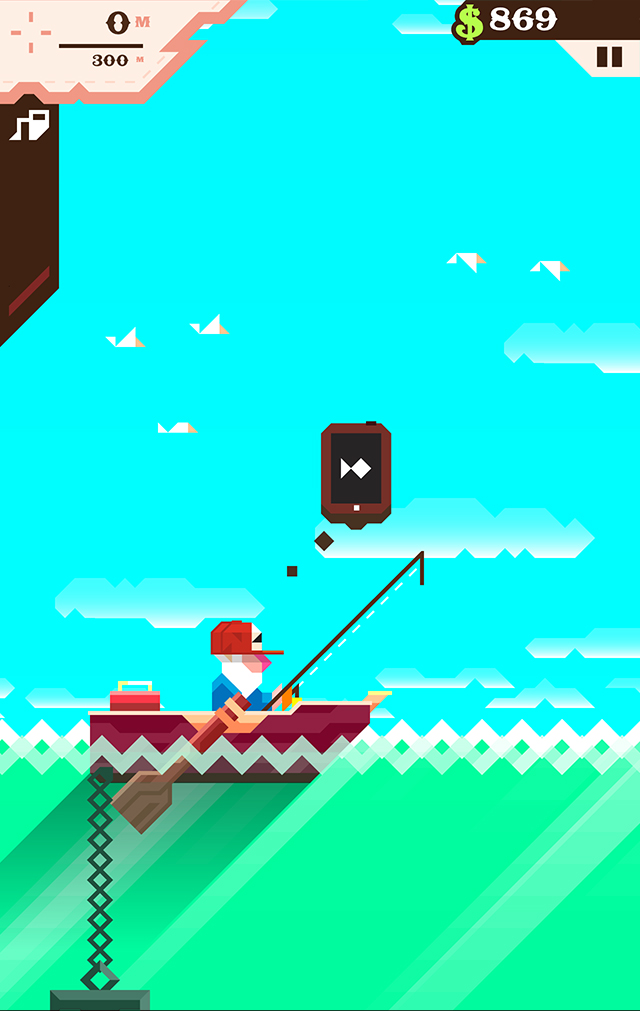
Billy at sea, waiting to cast fishing line

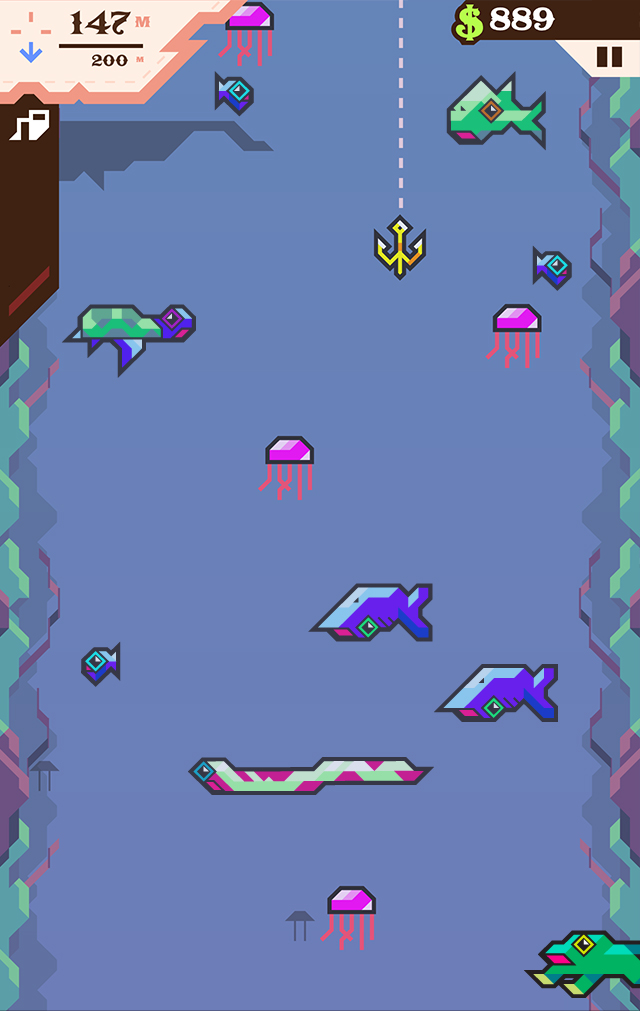
The player tilts the device as the hook descends to avoid the fish.

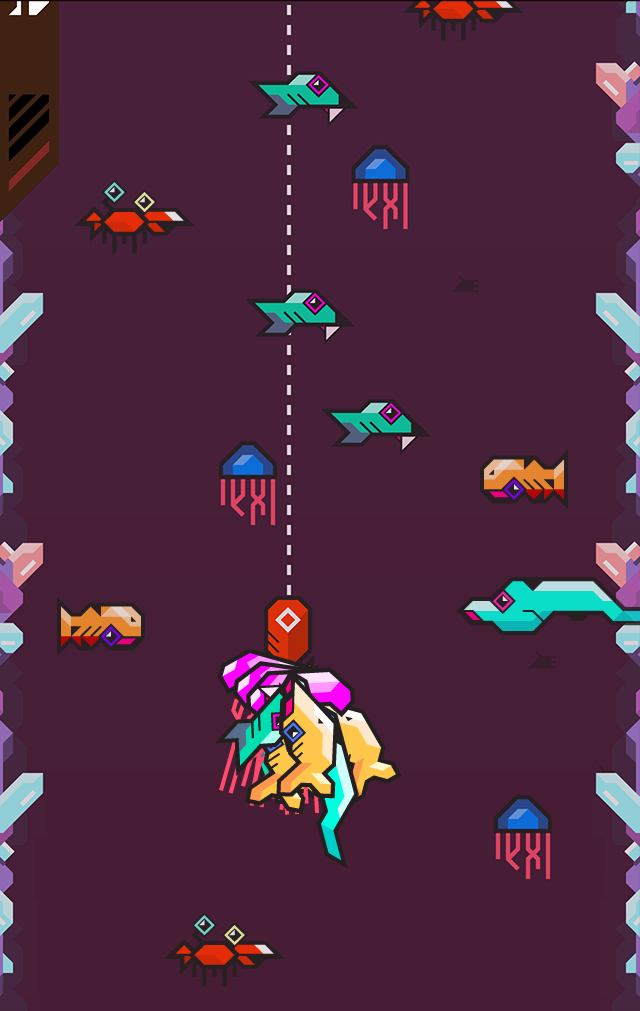
Upon catching a fish, the hook ascends and the player tilts the device to catch the fish.

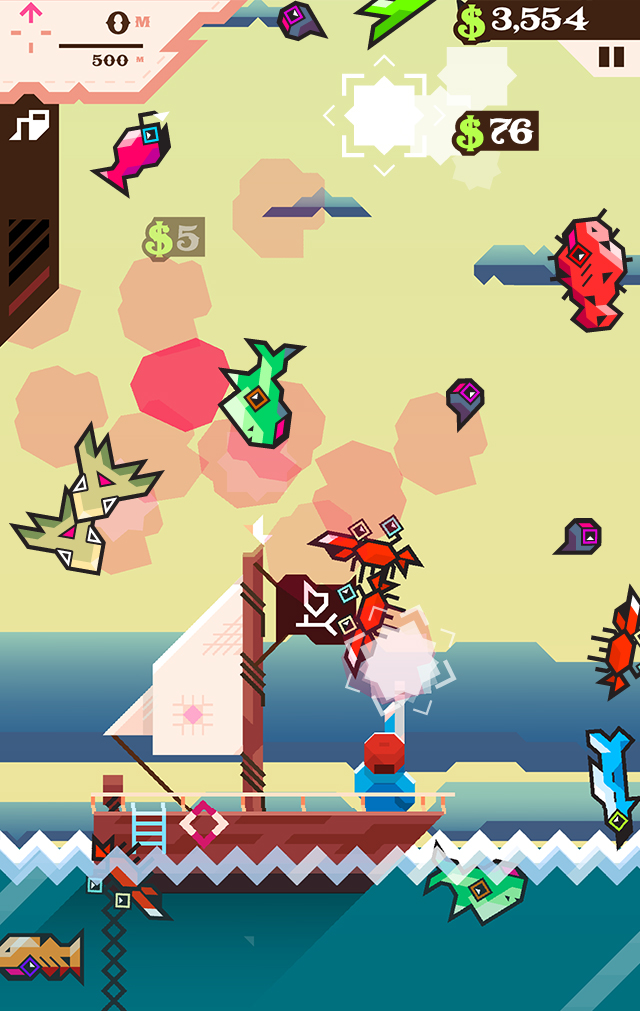
The fish scatter above water and the player taps the screen to shoot them out of the sky for money.

Screenshots of gameplay

== Development ==
Vlambeer developed Radical Fishing, an Adobe Flash-based game where a fisherman sits in a boat and casts his line into the water, pulls up fish into the air, and shoots them with a gun. It was built to take "everything good" from habit-forming browser games without artificially extending its length just to hook players. The game was designed with a feedback loop, where performance in one minigame led to a more rewarding experience in the next minigame. Vlambeer designer Jan Willem ("JW") Nijman developed the idea based on a television show about tuna fishermen that led him to consider an intersection between catching big fish, slow-motion photography, and Duck Hunt's game mechanics. Nijman immediately drafted the design, which never changed. The company sold the Flash game to a browser games website in 2010 but kept the rights to produce an iOS version, which they would call Ridiculous Fishing. They began production on the iOS version on December 7, 2010, with the intention of a "2012/2013 equivalent" of the original.

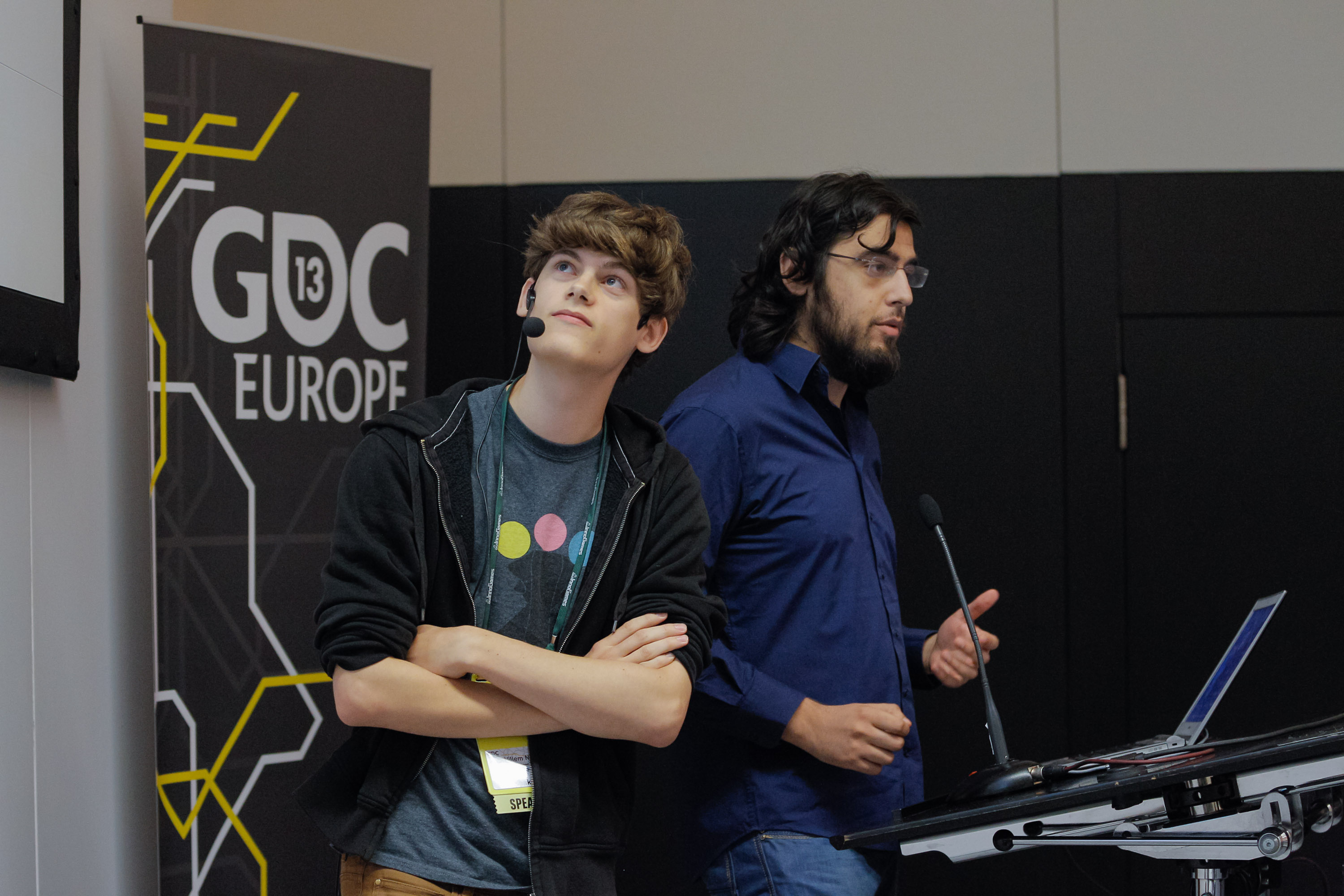
Nijman (designer) and Ismail (marketer) presenting the story of Ridiculous Fishing's development at GDC 2013

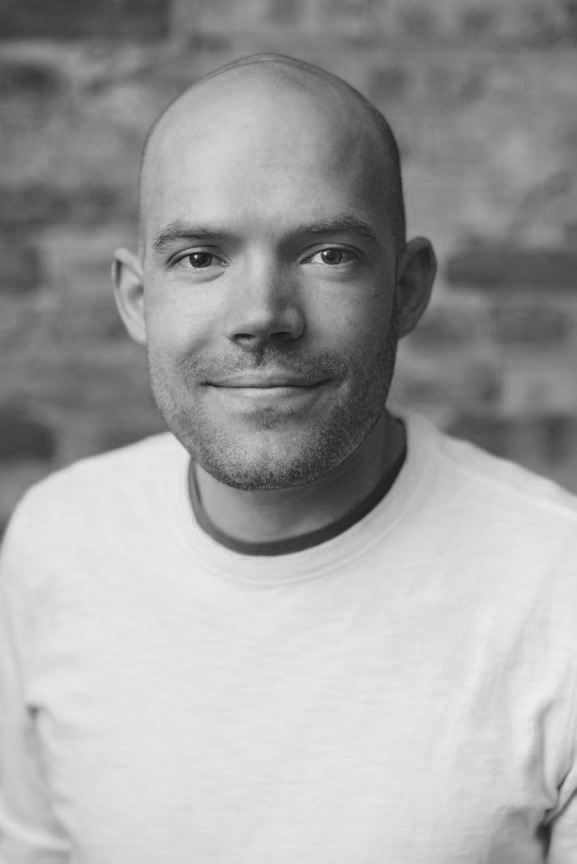
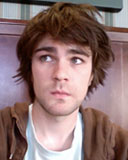
Wohlwend (artist) and Gage (iOS developer)

About a year later, Gamenauts released Ninja Fishing, a game with similar game mechanics but different art that became known as a clone of Radical Fishing. Polygon reports that the game "became an overnight sensation". Since game mechanics were not eligible for copyright protection, Vlambeer did not pursue legal action. Vlambeer's primary project had been Serious Sam: The Random Encounter, which was sidelined to handle the new clone situation. At one point, Vlambeer revealed its multiple in-game fishing locations and Ninja Fishing added a similar feature with a "coming soon" sign.

Vlambeer stopped Ridiculous Fishing development for several weeks, but later resolved to continue. Another concurrent project at the company, Super Crate Box, released in 2012 to industry praise. Super Crate Box was nominated for an Independent Games Festival award at the 2011 Game Developers Conference (GDC), where the team was largely unknown and the game did not win the award. By the next year, Ridiculous Fishing was nominated for the 2012 Independent Games Festival "Best Mobile Game" award at GDC, and Vlambeer had become known within the game development community for their two titles and struggle against Gamenauts's Ninja Fishing. Their 2012 GDC talk on game clones received standing ovations. Polygon referred to the speech as "a shot heard around the game industry". Ridiculous Fishing was shown at the 2012 Independent Games Festival GDC booth. The team also released a concurrent side project, Yeti Hunter, live from the GDC show floor. Nijman began development for Luftrausers on the plane home from the conference.

By now the team had four members: designer Jan Willem Nijman, marketer Rami Ismail, iOS developer Zach Gage, and artist Greg Wohlwend. (Note: Edge later described the team as an "indie supergroup". Eurogamer and TouchArcade similarly called the group a "dream team". They had previously worked on titles including Solipskier, SpellTower, and Spelunky.) The team continued work separately and sporadically, making meager headway and disheartened by the project's obstacles. Upon return to the Netherlands from GDC, Nijman and Ismail, the co-founders of Vlambeer, began to plan a "really large game", but ultimately decided that the idea was a diversion from the realities of finishing Ridiculous Fishing. In August 2012, after a road trip home across the United States from Penny Arcade Expo in Seattle to New York City, the team set a deadline to finish the game. The game was in a "disjointed" state, with good fishing mechanics, but poor shooting and menu navigation. They scrapped the store, interface, and endgame along with "90 percent" of their work, which revealed a specific direction for the rest of the game's development. Wohlwend, the artist, moved in with Gage, the developer, in New York City, working 14-hour days during the final weeks. The music was composed by Eirik Suhrke. (Note: Suhrke also worked on the Spelunky and Hotline Miami soundtracks.) The last parts of the game assembled smoothly, and Ismail submitted the game to the iOS App Store for approval from New York.

The game was released March 13, 2013. The company live-streamed Ridiculous Fishing's launch from their Utrecht office. A July 2013 patch added custom soundtracks, new fish, and an item for exiting the game early. Vlambeer released an Android version with the November 19, 2013 Humble Bundle.

== Reception ==
Reception

Aggregate score
Aggregator	Score
Metacritic	91/100

Review scores
Publication	Score
Edge	9/10
Eurogamer	8/10
IGN	8.0/10
Pocket Gamer	9/10
TouchArcade	5/5

The game was well received at launch with "near-universal perfect scores". Review score aggregator Metacritic describes its reception as "universal acclaim". As of April 2013, the game was the highest-rated for iOS in 2013. It won the "featured" position in the App Store, and, later, an Apple Design Award at the 2013 Apple Worldwide Developers Conference and Apple's iPhone game of the year. Pocket Gamer awarded it their gold award. In August 2013, Vlambeer announced that the game was nearing one million dollars in sales.

Edge noted that Ridiculous Fishing did not carry the emotional baggage behind the company's tumultuous development. Oli Welsh of Eurogamer called the balance beautiful and clever, an elaboration on their previous version's "idiot-savant design" without going too far. TouchArcade's Eli Hodapp commended the upgrade structure that combined obtainable incentives alongside gameplay as engaging as Doodle Jump's. IGN's Justin Davis praised the game's unpredictable and "poignant" ending at the bottom of the Arctic Floes. He added that the game could have been "even more ridiculous" and its levels more differentiated in theme and art style, though he found the "almost cubist design... absolutely gorgeous". Welsh of Eurogamer agreed that Wohlwend's art was "achingly cool" and reflected a "retro and minimalist" indie gaming trend without overpowering the gameplay. Welsh also praised the game's character by way of its fake Twitter feed, and Pocket Gamer's Rob Hearn compared its imaginative character to that of Wes Anderson's The Life Aquatic.

TouchArcade's Eli Hodapp called Ridiculous Fishing so well packaged as to make his recommendation "effortless" for both short few-minute play sessions as well as longer ones. Rob Hearn of Pocket Gamer lauded its "blossoming" progression and became more interested as he unlocked upgrades. But when there was nothing left to upgrade, Hearn wrote that "it's a shame that the innovation is confined to the first few hours". While Ridiculous Fishing offered many hours of secrets and unlocks, IGN's Davis noted that the game was at its core a "simple arcade experience... ultimately a polished arcade time-killer".

During the 17th Annual D.I.C.E. Awards, the Academy of Interactive Arts & Sciences nominated Ridiculous Fishing for "Casual Game of the Year" and "Mobile Game of the Year".
