= Cate West: The Vanishing Files =

2008 video game

- Developer: Gamenauts
- Publishers: WW: Real Arcade (Windows); NA: Destineer (Wii/DS); EU: Oxygen Games (Wii/DS)
- Platforms: Windows, Nintendo DS, Wii
- Release: Windows: NA: February 6, 2008; Nintendo DS: NA: December 15, 2008; EU: October 9, 2009; Wii: NA: March 23, 2009; EU: October 9, 2009
- Modes: Single-player, multiplayer

Cate West: The Vanishing Files is a mystery game created and developed by Gamenauts and published by Real Arcade for Windows.

The game was subsequently ported to the Nintendo DS and Wii platforms by Destineer. Oxygen Interactive Software distributed the Wii and DS versions for the European regions.

Players take control of Cate West, a crime novelist plagued by psychic visions, who has been approached by the police to help solve a series of "unsolvable" cases, dubbed "The Vanishing Files".

== Reception ==
Reception

Aggregate scores
Aggregator	Score
GameRankings	DS: 67.00% WII: 66.63%
Metacritic	DS: 68/100; WII: 65/100

Review scores
Publication	Score
GameSpot	6/10
Nintendo Life	7/10

Cate West: The Vanishing Files received mixed reviews from critics upon release. On Metacritic, the game holds scores of 68/100 for the DS version based on 4 reviews, and 65/100 for the Wii version based on 8 reviews. On GameRankings, the game holds scores of 67.00% for the DS version based on 4 reviews, and 66.63% for the Wii version based on 8 reviews.
