= Minit =

2018 video game

- Developers: JW, Kitty, Jukio, Dom
- Publisher: Devolver Digital
- Designer: Jan Willem Nijman
- Artists: Dominik Johann; Kitty Calis
- Composer: Jukio Kallio
- Series: Minit
- Engine: GameMaker: Studio
- Platforms: Linux; macOS; Windows; PlayStation 4; Xbox One; Nintendo Switch; Android; iOS
- Release: Linux, Mac, Windows, PS4, Xbox One; April 3, 2018; Switch; August 9, 2018; Android, iOS; June 27, 2019
- Genre: Action-adventure
- Mode: Single-player

Minit is a 2018 action-adventure video game developed by Jan Willem Nijman, Kitty Calis, Jukio Kallio, and Dominik Johann and published by Devolver Digital. It was released on April 3, 2018, for Windows, macOS, Linux, Xbox One, and PlayStation 4. A port to the Nintendo Switch was released later in 2018, followed versions for Android and iOS in 2019.

The game's premise is that each of the player's lives only lasts for one minute, resulting in "a peculiar little adventure played sixty seconds at a time". With each interval, the player will learn more about the environment.

== Gameplay and premise ==
Minit is a 2D top-down adventure game. The player takes control of an unnamed duck-like creature at their house. Initially, the player has no time limit and can explore a small space and will discover a sword washed up on the shore. Upon picking it up, it is revealed by a now-active timer that the sword is cursed. Every 60 seconds the player will die and wake up back in their home. The gameplay progresses with the player keeping all items they have collected during each of their sixty-second lives. Where they respawn depends on their last save point. The combat is a stab in the direction of movement, but extra abilities can be unlocked by certain items (the Gardening Glove allows the player to break trees).

The game has three modes. Normal mode has the standard rules and the 60-second timer. The Second Run can be played after Normal mode with added difficulties, restrictions, and a 40-second timer. An unlockable mode is Mary's Mode, where the player has no time limit and the music doesn't seem to play. In the second run, the player encounters the broken sword and re-activates the curse, but now the player is limited to one hit point, has less range, and the time limit is now 40 seconds. Upon doing everything again, the player flushes the sword once again, this time for good. In a post-credits scene, the player is relaxing on a remote island until almost all of the characters encountered suddenly appear.

== Development ==
Minit was developed by Jan Willem Nijman, co-founder of Vlambeer; Kitty Calis, who contributed to Horizon Zero Dawn; Jukio Kallio, a freelance composer; and Dominik Johann, art director of Crows Crows Crows. The concept for Minit was inspired by Adventure Minute, an earlier project from Jan Willem Nijman and Kitty Calis when they participated in and won Adventure Time Gamemaking Frenzy, an Adventure Time-themed game jam in 2012. The original game involved 1-minute long episodes. Years later, Willem and Calis wanted to make a new game with the same concept and recruited Jukio Kallio and Dominik Johann. A prototype was pitched to Devolver Digital where the game was only a single screen and no time limit with little content. Devolver Digital approved the publishing of the game and provided support in playtesting, porting, and promotion. Development for the game took roughly over a year. To ensure the game was simple to execute and enjoyable to develop, the team placed self-imposed limitations into the design such as being in black and white, and a 60-second timer. The team designed the world to have at least one secret in every section of the map.

Jukio Kallio found it challenging composing music due to the 60-second timer causing the death of the player character and interrupting the audio. To overcome the issue, Kallio divided the songs into roughly 1-minute increments that would loop with the next track when the player character dies.

A demo for the game was presented at E3 2017. The game is published by Devolver Digital and was released on April 3, 2018, for Windows, macOS, Linux, Xbox One, and PlayStation 4. On May 11, 2018, a Nintendo Switch version was announced on the first episode of Indie World, a web series from Nintendo of Japan that showcases indie games coming to the Japanese Nintendo eShop. It was released for the Nintendo Switch on August 9, 2018. It also came out for mobile devices on June 27, 2019. A port by for Commodore 64 was announced on June 20, 2019 and was scheduled to release later the same year.

== Promotion and merchandise ==
Devolver Digital partnered with Esc-Toy to release a collectable plus doll of the player character with Steam code included. Jukio Kalio self-published an original soundtrack with cover art by Thomas Wellman on April 3, 2018, via Bandcamp. Ghost Ramp released a limited edition vinyl version on January 25, 2019, with cover art by Justin Chan.

== Spin-off ==
In 2021, a spin-off game, Minit Fun Racer, which was released on Windows via Steam and itch.io as well as Nintendo Switch. All sales revenue from the game goes towards charities. The player drives a motorcycle in 10-second rounds while partaking in absurd activities, with the time increasing by collecting coins.

== Reception ==
Reception

Aggregate score
Aggregator	Score
Metacritic	PC: 79/100; PS4: 81/100; XONE: 74/100; NS: 80/100

Review scores
Publication	Score
Destructoid	10/10
Eurogamer	Recommended
Game Informer	8/10
GameSpot	8/10
Nintendo Life	8/10
Nintendo World Report	8.5/10
PC Gamer (US)	69/100
Push Square	7/10
RPGamer	4.5/5
TouchArcade	4.5/5

Minit received "generally favorable" reviews for Microsoft Windows, PlayStation 4, Xbox One, and Nintendo Switch, according to review aggregator Metacritic.

Destructoid gave Minit 10/10 ("flawless") and described the game as "an adventure [...] full of quirky characters, item switching, and semi-obtuse objectives".

Gamespot stated that Minit has an "extremely well-thought-out world design and engrossing loop of progress", giving it an 8/10 ("great").

== Accolades ==
Year	Award	Category	Result	Ref.
2018	Develop Awards	Gameplay Innovation	Nominated	
2018	Golden Joystick Awards	Best Indie Game	Nominated	
2018	Titanium Awards	Best Indie Game	Nominated	
2019	New York Game Awards	Statue of Liberty Award for Best World	Nominated	
2019	22nd Annual D.I.C.E. Awards	Outstanding Achievement for an Independent Game	Nominated	
2019	National Academy of Video Game Trade Reviewers Awards	Game, Original Family	Nominated	
2019	Independent Games Festival Awards	Seumas McNally Grand Prize	Nominated	
2019	2019 G.A.N.G. Awards	G.A.N.G. / MAGFEST People's Choice Award	Nominated	
2019	15th British Academy Games Awards	Game Design	Nominated	

== See also ==
- The Legend of Zelda: Majora's Mask, another game that features specific in-game times
- Half-Minute Hero, another game in which you have a short, definite timespan to accomplish tasks and advance the story
