= Restaurant Rush =

2008 video game

- Developer: Menara Games
- Publisher: Gamenauts
- Programmers: Christian Senjaya; Heru Kurniawan; Ade Anom Arimbowo
- Composer: Tony Sugianto
- Series: Burger Rush series
- Engine: GDevelop; Unity; Construct 3
- Platforms: Microsoft Windows; iOS
- Release: Microsoft Windows: August 16, 2008 iOS: May 22, 2013
- Genres: Puzzle video game Matching
- Mode: Single-player

Restaurant Rush is a casual matching puzzle and time-management video game developed by Gamenauts and Menara Games and published by Big Fish Games. Originally released on August 16, 2008, the game is a sequel to Burger Rush and follows the protagonist, Heidi, as she evolves from a burger flipper into a professional chef.

== Gameplay ==
The game combines match‑3 puzzle mechanics with time-management strategy across 80 levels. Additional gameplay elements include sourcing fresh ingredients from the in-game Farmer's Market and using interactive features like a jukebox to enhance the player's restaurant environment.

== Plot ==
Restaurant Rush follows the protagonist, Heidi, who has graduated from Burger Rush and now aspires to become a professional chef. Players manage a cooking school, preparing over 50 international recipes—including Filet Mignon, Dim Sum, and Pizza Marinara—while serving customers and maintaining their satisfaction.

== Reception ==
Restaurant Rush received generally positive reviews from critics. Gamezebo gave the Windows version an 80% rating (4 out of 5 stars), praising the game for retaining the successful elements of its predecessor, Burger Rush, while introducing new gameplay features and additional recipes. The review noted that the game offered fans a familiar yet refreshed time-management and match-3 experience.
