= Cook & Becker =

Dutch online art dealership

- Company type: Private
- Industry: Video games
- Founded: 2011
- Founders: Maarten Brands; Ruben Brands
- Headquarters: Amsterdam, Netherlands
- Key people: Maarten Brands; Ruben Brands
- Website: cookandbecker.com

Cook & Becker is a Netherlands-based art gallery, online store, publisher and design studio specializing in digital art, videogame art and concept art. Founded in 2011, the company is known for its fine art prints of popular videogames like Journey, Mass Effect, The Last of Us, The Witcher and Ōkami. and art books about video game icons such as Sonic The Hedgehog and PAC-MAN.

== Overview ==
Cook & Becker was founded in 2011 by brothers Maarten and Ruben Brands, with the intention of creating a more prominent position in the contemporary art world for artists in the games and entertainment industry who shape a big part of contemporary visual culture. It has since acquired the rights to produce art prints for many popular video games, including The Witcher, Mass Effect, Uncharted 4: A Thief's End, The Last of Us, Ōkami, Destiny, Bioshock: Infinite, ELDEN RING and Dark Souls.

In October 2011, Cook & Becker organized its first exhibit at Art.Fair/Blooom!, a contemporary art fair in Cologne, Germany.

In November 2014, Cook & Becker co-organized the New Horizons exhibition at the Fries Museum's first Next Gen Art Event in Leeuwarden, The Netherlands. This exhibition featured the work of various videogame studios, including a touring collection of Naughty Dog artworks spanning 30 years of game development. Over the years, Cook & Becker contributed to many art shows at various galleries, museums and pop-culture conventions, including a Cyberpunk 2077 exhibit at Lucca Games and Comics in Lucca, Italy in 2024 with Italiian tape artist No Curves.

In 2015, Cook & Becker released a line of prints based on SEGA retro games with all new artwork by notable artists. 2015 Also saw the launch of their first art book, Killzone Visual Design, based on the Killzone series by developer Guerrilla Games. This release was followed in 2016 by the art book 120 Years of Vlambeer & Friends. Bringing back arcade since 1896, about indie game studio Vlambeer. An official Sonic the Hedgehog art book, Sonic the Hedgehog 25th Anniversary Art Book, which chronicles the series' origin and evolution, was released in April 2017. An official PAC-MAN book Birth of an Icon was published in 2021.

== Notable videogame art books ==
- Killzone Visual Design (hc, 208 pages, 2015, ISBN 978-90-824576-0-5)
- 120 Years of Vlambeer and Friends. Bringing back arcade games since 1896 (pb, 176 pages, 2016, ISBN 978-90-824576-3-6)
- Sonic the Hedgehog 25th Anniversary Art Book (hc, 248 pages, 2017, ISBN 978-90-824576-5-0)
- The Art & Design of FINAL FANTASY XV (hc, 220 pages, 2017, ISBN 978-90-824576-6-7)
- PAC-MAN: Birth of an Icon (hc, 336 pages, 2021, ISBN 9781789099393)
- World of Tanks: Journey Through Art (hc, 256 pages, 2025 ISBN 9781789099393)
