= Luftrausers =

2014 video game

- Developer: Vlambeer
- Publisher: Devolver Digital
- Composer: Jukio Kallio
- Series: Luftrauser
- Engine: GameMaker
- Platforms: Linux, OS X, Windows, PlayStation 3, PlayStation Vita, Android
- Release: Linux, OS X, Windows; March 18, 2014; PS3, PS Vita; NA: March 18, 2014; PAL: March 19, 2014; Android; May 28, 2015
- Genre: Shoot 'em up
- Mode: Single-player

Luftrausers is a shoot 'em up video game developed by Netherlands-based indie developer studio Vlambeer and published by Devolver Digital for Microsoft Windows, OS X, Linux, PlayStation 3 and PlayStation Vita. It was released in March 2014 and ported to Android by General Arcade on May 28, 2015. A demake of the game, titled LuftrauserZ, was developed by Paul Koller for Commodore 64, Commodore 128 and Commodore 64 Games System, and released by RGCD and Vlambeer on December 8, 2017.

== Gameplay ==
Luftrausers is an airplane-based shoot 'em up. Unlike traditional shoot 'em ups, in which the direction of the player craft is fixed, Luftrausers allows 360 degrees of motion, more akin to a multidirectional shooter. However, the player's main weapon can only fire from the front, forcing the player to take into account the position and angle of the airplane. Players must take into account the momentum of their plane while flying, using gravity and drift to maneuver as much as forward propulsion.

There is no health bar: player health is indicated by a circle around the aircraft that shrinks as damage increases and naturally regenerates when not firing the weapon.

Aircraft can be customized with dozens of combinations of engines, weapons, and hulls that affect the soundtrack as much as the gameplay. Each weapon part comes with sets of challenges that give objects to strive for, on top of the arcade nature of the game.

== Development ==
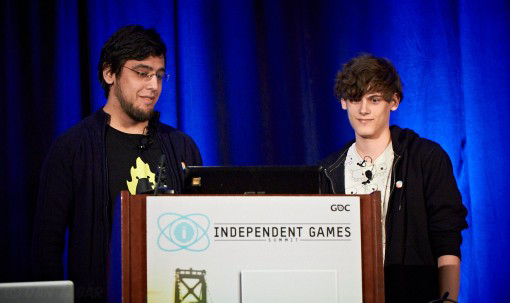
Ismail and Nijman of Vlambeer speaking at the 2013 GDC Independent Games Summit

Jan Willem Nijman of Vlambeer started Luftrausers while on the airplane home from the March 2012 Game Developers Conference (GDC) in San Francisco. Polygon reported that he was inspired by the "beauty of his view" and did not have on-flight television. At the time, Vlambeer was finishing development on Ridiculous Fishing, a game whose development was marked by a high-profile struggle with a similar, subsequent game known as a clone.

Luftrausers is an update of Luftrauser, an earlier, free Flash game created by Vlambeer's Rami Ismail, artist Paul Veer, and composer Kozilek in the GameMaker: Studio engine and was ported to pure C++ by Michel Paulissen via his Dex converter tool. Vlambeer originally announced the game for release in Q2 2013 on PlayStation 3 and PlayStation Vita, having chosen those platforms due to their positive working relationship with Sony. In the weeks before the expected release, the Bangalore-based Rubiq Lab released a similar airplane dogfight game called SkyFar in April 2013 and Vlambeer contacted Apple and Google to intervene so as to avoid "another clone war". Rami Ismail's backpack containing "everything Vlambeer" including electronics and the game's code was stolen during E3 2013. Although their work was backed up, Ismail described the theft as "a giant pain".

The game was simultaneously released on Microsoft Windows, OS X, Linux, PlayStation 3, and PlayStation Vita (via Steam and the Humble Store) on March 18, 2014, being published by Devolver Digital. The game's two-and-a-half-year development cycle was profitable within three days of its release. On December 20, 2014, the game was ported to Amazon Fire TV by General Arcade.

== Reception ==
Reception

Aggregate score
Aggregator	Score		
Aggregator	PC	PS Vita	PS3
Metacritic	80/100	83/100	80/100

Review scores
Publication	Score		
Publication	PC	PS Vita	PS3
Destructoid	8.5/10	N/A	N/A
Eurogamer	9/10	N/A	N/A
Game Informer	8.5/10	N/A	8.5/10
GameSpot	7/10	N/A	7/10
GameTrailers	8/10	N/A	N/A
Gamezebo	5/5	N/A	N/A
Giant Bomb	4/5	4/5	4/5
IGN	N/A	8.7/10	N/A
Joystiq	4.5/5	N/A	N/A
PlayStation Official Magazine – UK	N/A	9/10	N/A
PC Gamer (UK)	80%	N/A	N/A
Pocket Gamer	N/A	4.5/5	N/A
Polygon	8/10	N/A	8/10
VentureBeat	90/100	N/A	N/A
Digital Spy	N/A	4/5	N/A
The Escapist	N/A	4.5/5	N/A

The game received "generally favorable" reviews on all platforms, according to video game review score aggregator Metacritic.

Jake Valentine of GameZone gave the PC version nine out of ten, saying, "I could talk more and more about how enjoyable Luftrausers is, how exciting the gameplay is, how easy re-starting the game after death can be, how addicting and exhilarating the experience is, but at the end of the day, you can kill a battleship by flying your plane through it." EGMNow gave the PlayStation 3 version nine out of ten, saying, "Hearkening back to a bygone era of simple-yet-deep arcade games where you played for score, not story, Luftrausers takes basic ideas in concept and execution and turns them into hours of challenging, chaotic fun." Push Square gave the same PS3 version eight stars out of ten, calling it "a tremendously well polished action arcade package." Edge gave the PC version eight out of ten, saying that it was "surprisingly tactical". PCGamesN gave the same PC version eight out of ten, saying, "Simple in almost all respects, Luftrauser is one of Vlambeer's biggest triumphs because it strips back everything in the name of exposing the fun at the centre of the game. It's almost as if the designers were engineers of the rauser itself; reducing weight and tweaking fuel lines to ensure the most effective deliverer of death possible." USgamer gave the same PC version a score of four out of five, saying, "Vlambeer improves on one of its smaller, free releases with Luftrausers, expanding an excellent dogfighting game with a ton of customization and a great soundtrack. Short play sessions means it's the perfect game to play on the bus, between classes, or even during your boring meetings. Just don't scream out loud and pump your fist in the sky when you finally beat your high score. That's rude."

The Escapist gave the Vita version four-and-a-half stars out of five, saying, "Despite a few issues with its end game challenges, Luftrausers is a surprisingly addictive, challenging arcade game that will keep you glued to your Vita for game after game after game." Digital Spy gave the same Vita version four stars out of five, saying, "From frustrating beginnings to high-score runs involving nukes and boosts, Luftrausers is a game packed with a surprising amount of depth, infinite replayability, and truly satisfying risk versus reward gameplay." The Digital Fix gave the PC version eight out of ten, calling it "an entertaining blast." Metro gave the PlayStation 3 version eight out of ten, saying, "The spirit of the arcade will never die thanks to games like this, as Vlambeer demonstrate their mastery of minimalist action." However, 411Mania gave the PC version six out of ten, saying that it was "what a modern arcade game ostensibly is: small, bite-sized bits of gameplay that is broken up by countless deaths over and over. Unlocking new plane parts is fun in the game and there is some merit to just flying around the level blowing up various ships and planes. However, the surrounding nature of the game, such as it not explaining itself very well, and the obscure way things happen in a round, or even what the mission objectives are, can bring the game down."

Giant Bomb awarded the game Best Music of 2014. At the 2014 National Academy of Video Game Trade Reviewers (NAVGTR) awards the game was nominated for Control Precision.
