= Rami Ismail =

Dutch video game developer (born 1988)

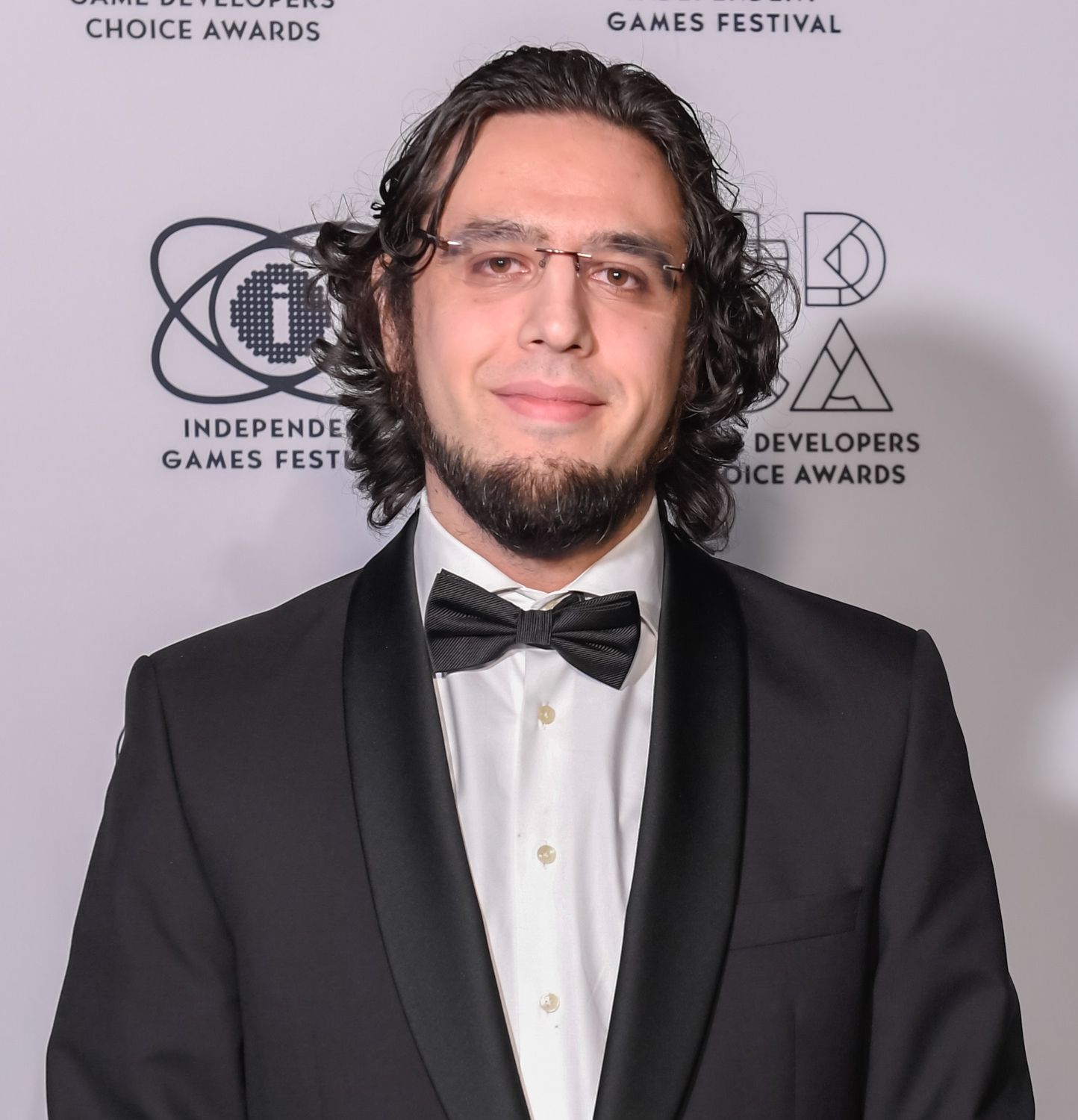
- Ismail in 2018
- Born: 30 October 1988 (age 38); Netherlands
- Occupation: Video game developer
- Known for: Vlambeer
- Notable work: Ridiculous Fishing; Nuclear Throne

Rami Ismail (born 30 October 1988) is a Dutch-Egyptian independent video game developer. He is further known for being a spokesperson within the video game industry on the topics of diversity and reaching out to game developers from developing countries. He co-founded the studio Vlambeer with Jan Willem Nijman in 2010, where they developed games such as Ridiculous Fishing, Luftrausers, and Nuclear Throne.

== Early life ==
Ismail was born in the Netherlands to an Egyptian father and Dutch mother, and was raised as a Muslim.

== Vlambeer ==
Ismail had attended the Utrecht School of the Arts where he met Jan Willem Nijman. The two paired up during a game development course, producing what they thought was a potentially marketable game. When the school demanded rights to the game, both dropped out of the school and founded Vlambeer in 2010 so they could continue developing games without this type of interference. While many of Vlambeer's games were critically well received, the studio was propelled by the overnight success of the 2013 mobile game Ridiculous Fishing, which brought in more than US$1 million in revenue within six months, helping to financially stabilize Vlambeer and both Ismail and Nijman.

Through Vlambeer, Ismail led the development of presskit() and distribute(), free online tools for independent developers to prepare and distribute press kits and marketing materials, demo-ready copies of games, and other materials to press members.

== Views ==
As a Muslim and frequently in contact with members of the video game industry outside of Western and Asian nations, Ismail has spoken about better reaching programmers in developing countries. He has been strongly critical of policies like the Trump travel ban, which not only has affected his travels into the United States, but which he states puts a great cost towards programmers from developing countries to attend important industry functions. In 2018, Ismail issued more criticism at the travel ban, as several non-Western or Asian developers were prevented from obtaining travel visas to attend the Game Developers Conference in the United States. In January 2019, Ismail announced the establishment of Gamedev.world, a game developer conference aimed at independent game developers from these affected countries that he founded with Sarah Elmaleh, Gwen Frey, Houssem Ben Amor and Gabriel Dal Santo. Gamedev.world was to be a games conference that was also inclusive of non-Western countries. The inaugural conference was held via online streaming and other virtual conference services in June 2019. Presenters were able to talk in their native tongue, and talks were translated in 30 different languages. In the wake of the cancellation of the physical 2020 Game Developers Conference due to the COVID-19 pandemic, Gamedev.world ran several charitable events to help developers who had lost non-refundable payments for attending the conference to help recoup costs.

== Accolades ==
Ismail, along with Nijman, were featured in Forbes 30 under 30 for Games in 2015. Ismail was given the Ambassador award from the 2018 Game Developers Choice Awards for his activism towards encouraging diversity within video games and helping to support game developers from less-developed countries. Variety named Ismail one of the Most Influential in Videogames in 2018 for his work in creating free tools for independent creators and GamesIndustry.biz named Ismail one of its People of the Year for 2018 for his continued support for engaging with developing countries. In December 2018, Ismail was invited to the "Uitblinkerslunch" with King Willem-Alexander and Queen Máxima, an annual event that honors a handful of Dutch people who have achieved "extraordinary accomplishments".

== Personal life ==
Ismail lives in the Netherlands. For five years, he had lived with his wife Adriel Wallick, another game developer, whom he met through his work in video games. With the help of Bungie, the two were virtually engaged within Destiny in October 2016, and were married by November 2017. The two separated by August 2018 and remain friends. Ismail also frequently gives talks at both smaller and larger conventions and also frequently gives Game Design lectures at universities.

In August 2022 Ismail completed his flight training and became a licensed pilot. He credits playing Microsoft Flight Simulator with helping him pass the examination.
