= Vlambeer =

Dutch video game developer

- Type: Private
- Industry: Video games
- Founded: 1 September 2010; 15 years ago
- Founders: Rami Ismail; Jan Willem Nijman
- Defunct: 1 September 2020
- Headquarters: Utrecht, Netherlands
- Key people: Jan Willem Nijman
- Products: Super Crate Box; Serious Sam: The Random Encounter; Ridiculous Fishing; Luftrausers; Nuclear Throne
- Website: vlambeer.com

Vlambeer is a Dutch independent video game developer based in Utrecht. Founded in 2010, the studio was composed of Rami Ismail and Jan Willem Nijman. The studio is known for the games Super Crate Box (2010), Serious Sam: The Random Encounter (2011), Ridiculous Fishing (2013), Luftrausers (2014), and Nuclear Throne (2015), as well as for their stand against video game cloning.

== History ==
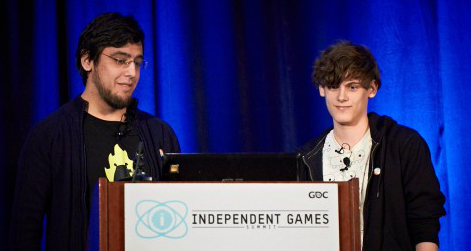
Vlambeer's Rami Ismail (left) and Jan Willem Nijman at the 2013 Game Developers Conference

Vlambeer was founded in 2010 by Rami Ismail and Jan Willem Nijman after both dropped out from a game design course at the Utrecht School of the Arts. According to Ismail, they had been developing a game outside of the school, but when the school found out, the school demanded the rights to the game, which they refused, leading to their decision to drop out. Ismail and Nijman began by working together to develop a prototype, initially created by Nijman, called "Crates from Hell". It was released on 11 May 2010 as Super Crate Box and earned the studio recognition in the form of an Independent Games Festival finalist position in the Excellence in Design category. During the development of Super Crate Box, Vlambeer developed Radical Fishing. It was released in November 2010. Radical Fishing was the first of many games released by the studio under a "Not Vlambeer" label, which encompasses the studio's games that are developed for money or as an experiment.

Vlambeer was approached by publisher Devolver Digital to develop a game in the Serious Sam franchise. The studio and Devolver Digital agreed to develop and publish a turn-based role-playing game. The result, Serious Sam: The Random Encounter, was released on 24 October 2011. During the development of Serious Sam: The Random Encounter, Vlambeer released many small games, most notably Luftrauser. Vlambeer started development on an iOS version of Radical Fishing called Ridiculous Fishing. Development was halted after a San Francisco–based studio released a clone of Radical Fishing on iOS. This generated discussion about the cloning of video games and led Vlambeer to be somewhat of an icon on the topic. The term "Vlambeer'd" was introduced by several media outlets. In November 2013, the browser game Vlambeer Clone Tycoon was launched to provide a satirical comment on the issue of Vlambeer's cloning ordeals.

In February 2012, Vlambeer released Gun Godz, a first-person shooter inspired by hip-hop, in collaboration with Brandon Boyer's Venus Patrol. Ridiculous Fishing was nominated for the 2012 Independent Games Festival "Best Mobile" award. At the conference where the award ceremony was held, Vlambeer released Yeti Hunter.

On 2 December 2012, Vlambeer announced a sequel to Luftrauser called Luftrausers. On 19 December 2012, Vlambeer released the iOS version of Super Crate Box. Its success prevented the studio from going out of business due to the financial ramifications of the decreased motivation caused by the cloning incident. On 14 March 2013, Vlambeer released Ridiculous Fishing on iOS after resuming its development.

In 2015, they experimented with live streaming their development process and had at one point over 12,000 paid subscriptions to their Twitch channel.

On 5 December 2015, Vlambeer released Nuclear Throne, a top-down shooter roguelike which had been in Steam's early access program since 2013. The game was released for Microsoft Windows, OS X, Linux, PlayStation 4 and PlayStation Vita, receiving positive reviews from users.

On 8 August 2016, Vlambeer announced 120 Years Of Vlambeer And Friends. Bringing back arcade games since 1896, an art and history book of the company written by Arjan Terpstra and published by Cook & Becker.

Ismail received the Ambassador Award at the March 2018 Game Developers Choice Awards for his support of independent video game development through both Vlambeer and other activities.

On 1 September 2020, the tenth anniversary of the studio's formation, Vlambeer announced that the studio would come to a close. Ismail and Nijman had made the decision a few weeks prior, having come to recognize they were moving in separate directions within the video game industry since 2016. They had plans to release a final game, Ultrabugs, which has yet to be released as of July 2024. Ismail plans to continue to work on supporting advocacy for diversity within the video game industry while Nijman expects to continue to help develop smaller games similar to Minit with other teams.

In April 2024, Ismail sold his shares of the company to Nijman, giving him 100% ownership. Nijman reopened the studio, intending to release improvements to their existing games as well as to complete Ultrabugs after he finished his current unannounced project outside the Vlambeer label.

== Games ==
- Super Crate Box (2010)
- Karate (2011)
- Serious Sam: The Random Encounter (2011)
- Gun Godz (2012)
- Yeti Hunter (2012)
- Ridiculous Fishing (2013)
- Luftrausers (2014)
- Nuclear Throne (2015)
- Ultrabugs (TBA)
- Ridiculous Fishing EX (2023)
