= Super Crate Box =

2010 video game

- Developer: Vlambeer
- Publisher: Vlambeer
- Designers: Rami Ismail; Jan Willem Nijman
- Artists: Roy Nathan de Groot; Paul Veer
- Composer: Eirik Suhrke
- Engine: GameMaker
- Platforms: Microsoft Windows; Mac OS X; iOS; PlayStation Vita; Ouya; Linux; Nintendo Switch
- Release: Microsoft Windows; 22 October 2010; Mac OS X; 26 November 2010; iOS; 5 January 2012; PS Vita; 3 October 2012; Ouya; 25 June 2013; Linux; 25 August 2016; Nintendo Switch; 1 October 2019
- Genre: Shoot 'em up
- Modes: Single-player, multiplayer

Super Crate Box is a shoot 'em up and indie game by Vlambeer. It was first released for Microsoft Windows on 22 October 2010, and was followed with ports to Mac OS X on 26 November 2010, to iOS on 4 January 2012, and to PlayStation Vita on 3 October 2012. A Commodore 64 demake of the game was developed by Paul Koller, with music by Mikkel Hastrup, and published by RGCD as Super Bread Box on 22 October 2013.

== Gameplay ==
General gameplay in Super Crate Box. The red enemies have fallen into the pit previously, and are angry and run faster.

Super Crate Box's core gameplay revolves around a 2D map. Enemies continually spawn from the top of the map, and come in three varieties: small, large and flying. A crate is always available in a random location on the map, and picking up a crate gives one of 14 weapons, selected at random. At all times, there is a fire pit at the bottom of the map. If an enemy reaches the bottom of the map and falls into the pit, it will respawn at the top of the map with the same health but moving considerably faster. Contact with an enemy results in immediate death.

The goal of the game is to survive as long as possible by using the different weapons obtained from crates to kill enemies. The number of crates that the player picks up before dying constitutes the score. By attaining certain numbers of crates in the game the player can unlock new weapons, game modes and cosmetic character skins.

There is a leaderboard available on the official website that tracks high scores for the various modes. The game supports joypad controls.

== Development ==
=== Commodore 64 version ===
In 2012, Super Crate Box was ported to the Commodore 64 home computer by Paul Koller. This conversion became available as a cartridge on 3 October 2013 under the title Super Bread Box. The version features three new and exclusive Commodore 64-themed levels, in addition to the original three, as well as online high score tables, but lacks the SFMT and Ambush modes due to limitations of the hardware.

== Reception ==
Reception

Aggregate score
| Aggregator | Score |
|---|---|
| Metacritic | (Vita) 80/100 (iOS) 75/100 (NS) 60/100 |

Review scores
| Publication | Score |
|---|---|
| The A.V. Club | (PC) A− |
| Edge | (iOS) 8/10 |
| Eurogamer | (iOS) 9/10 |
| Gamezebo | (iOS) 4/5 |
| IGN | (iOS) 6.5/10 |
| MacLife | (iOS) 4.5/5 |
| Pocket Gamer | (iOS) 4/5 |
| Push Square | (Vita) 8/10 |
| TouchArcade | (iOS) 5/5 |
| VideoGamer.com | (iOS) 7/10 |
| Digital Spy | (iOS) 5/5 |
| Metro | (iOS) 7/10 |

The PlayStation Vita and iOS versions received "generally favourable reviews", while the Switch version received "mixed" reviews, according to the review aggregation website Metacritic. Mike Mason of Push Square said of the Vita version, "it's a twitch platformer-cum-shooter that preys on compulsion", and added, "If you dare to open the box on a lazy day, don't expect to close it again for an hour." Edge said of the iOS version, "The challenge is fierce; as your tally climbs above its previous best, the accompanying exclamation mark is a virtual eyebrow raised in surprise at your achievement." Brad Nicholson of TouchArcade said of the same iOS version, "The hooks are in its constituent parts, which seamlessly blend into a cacophony of arcade action surrounding this pure purpose of play."
