= Kowloon Nights =

Video game investment fund

Kowloon Nights is a video game investment fund established in 2017. It was launched by French entrepreneur and incumbent chief executive officer Alexis Garavaryan with Hong Kong-born and Japan-based founding partner Jay Chi.

== History ==
Alexis Garavaryan, a former employee of Ubisoft, ID@Xbox and Tencent, and Jay Chi, former Head of Video Games Practice at McKinsey & Company and founding partner of Makers Fund, established Kowloon Nights in October 2017 as they felt value in their "knowledge of and access to Asian markets". The fund's investors are said to be "based in Asia" and "from the game industry". The name references Kowloon City in Hong Kong and is meant to reflect "Asian roots".

On 17 March 2022, Kowloon announced a revenue milestone of US$150m and partnership with Kepler Interactive, a game publisher whose foundation Garavaryan also spearheaded.

== Games ==
Year	Title	Developer(s)	Platform(s)
2019	A Place for the Unwilling	ALPixel Games	Windows, macOS, PlayStation 4, Xbox One, Nintendo Switch
2019	Sea Salt	YCJY Games	Windows, Xbox One, Nintendo Switch
2020	Spiritfarer	Thunder Lotus Games	Windows, macOS, Linux, PlayStation 4, Xbox One, Nintendo Switch, iOS, Android
2020	Welcome to Elk	Triple Topping	Windows, macOS, Linux, Xbox One, Nintendo Switch
2020	The Red Lantern	Timberline Studio	Windows, Nintendo Switch
2020	Godfall	Counterplay Games	Windows, PlayStation 4, PlayStation 5, Xbox One, Xbox Series X/S
2021	Legend of Keepers	Goblinz Studio	Windows, macOS, Linux, PlayStation 4, PlayStation 5, Xbox One, Xbox Series X/S, Nintendo Switch, iOS, Android
2021	Starbase	Frozenbyte	Windows
2021	Garden Story	Picogram & Rose City Games	Windows, macOS, Xbox One, Nintendo Switch
2021	Opus: Echo of Starsong	SIGONO	Windows, macOS, Xbox One, Xbox Series X/S, Nintendo Switch, iOS
2022	Nine to Five	Redhill Games	Windows
2022	Mad Streets	Craftshop Arts	Windows, Xbox One
2022	Rollerdrome	Roll7	Windows, PlayStation 4, PlayStation 5, Xbox Series X/S
2022	We Are OFK	Team OFK	Windows, PlayStation 4, PlayStation 5, Nintendo Switch
2022	Scorn	Ebb Software	Windows, PlayStation 5, Xbox Series X/S
2022	TFM: The First Men	Gathering Tree	Windows
2022	Common'hood	Plethora Project	Windows, Xbox One, Xbox Series X/S
2023	30XX	Batterystaple Games	Windows, Nintendo Switch
2023	Sifu	Sloclap	Windows, PlayStation 4, PlayStation 5, Xbox One, Xbox Series X/S, Nintendo Switch
2023	The Wreck	The Pixel Hunt	Windows, macOS, PlayStation 4, PlayStation 5, Xbox One, Xbox Series X/S, Nintendo Switch, iOS, Android
2023	Tchia	Awaceb	Windows, PlayStation 4, PlayStation 5, Xbox Series X/S, Nintendo Switch
2023	En Garde!	Fireplace Games	Windows
2023	Shadow Gambit: The Cursed Crew	Mimimi Games	Windows, PlayStation 5, Xbox Series X/S
2023	Jumplight Odyssey (early access)	League of Geeks	Windows
2023	Sea of Stars	Sabotage Studio	Windows, PlayStation 4, PlayStation 5, Xbox One, Xbox Series X/S, Nintendo Switch
2023	Eternights	Studio Sai	Windows, PlayStation 4, PlayStation 5, Nintendo Switch
2023	Battle Shapers (early access)	Metric Empire	Windows
2024	Ultros	Hadoque	Windows, macOS, PlayStation 4, PlayStation 5
2024	Helskate (early access)	Phantom Coast	Windows
2024	Solium Infernum	League of Geeks	Windows
2024	Another Crab's Treasure	Aggro Crab	Windows, PlayStation 5, Xbox One, Xbox Series X/S, Nintendo Switch
2024	Fera: The Sundered Tribes (early access)	Massive Damage	Windows
2024	Techtonica	Fire Hose Games	Windows, PlayStation 5, Xbox One, Xbox Series X/S
2024	Towers of Aghasba (early access)	Dreamlit	Windows, PlayStation 5
2024	Overthrown (early access)	Brimstone	Windows, PlayStation 5, Xbox Series X/S
2025	33 Immortals	Thunder Lotus	Windows, Xbox Series X/S
2025	Keep Driving	YCJY Games	Windows
2025	Promise Mascot Agency	Kaizen Game Works Limited	Windows, PlayStation 4, PlayStation 5, Xbox One, Xbox Series X/S, Nintendo Switch
2025	Generation Exile	Sonderlust Studios	Windows, PlayStation 5, Xbox Series X/S
2025	Begone Beast	Tandemi	Windows
2025	Consume Me	Jenny & AP Thompson	Windows, macOS
TBA	TankHead	Alpha Channel	Windows
TBA	She Dreams Elsewhere	Studio Zevere	Windows, macOS, Linux, Xbox One, Xbox Series X/S, Nintendo Switch
TBA	Worship	Chasing Rats Games	Windows
TBA	Sword of Symphony	Stephen Ddungu	Windows
TBA	Streets of Fortuna	Kitfox Games	Windows
TBA	Let's Build a Dungeon	Springloaded	Windows, Xbox One, Xbox Series X/S
TBA	gen ATLAS	gen DESIGN	Windows, PlayStation 5, Xbox Series X/S
TBA	At Fate's End	Thunder Lotus	Windows, PlayStation 5, Xbox Series X/S
TBA	TBA	Rogue Snail	TBA
