= Lisy Kane =

Australian video game producer

- Education: Queensland University of Technology
- Occupation: Video game producer
- Website: www.lisykane.com

Lisy Kane is an Australian video game producer who has worked at League of Geeks and Kepler Interactive. She is the co-founder of Girl Geek Academy, an organization that advocates for women in fields of engineering and technology development.

== Biography ==
In 2013, Kane earned a double degree in game design and public relations from Queensland University of Technology. After graduating, she joined independent games studio League of Geeks and worked on Armello as both a line producer and scrum master. In 2022, she joined Kepler Interactive as an associate producer, later moving into the role of production director and worked on games such as Pacific Drive, Scorn, and Sifu. Kane also contributed to the production of Hand of Fate and Push Me Pull You.

In 2023, Kane was appointed to the VicScreen board of directors being cited as a "respected leader in Victoria’s digital games sector". The same year, she also joined the board of the International Game Developers Association Foundation. Kane serves as an adviser to Kowloon Nights games fund which promotes independent game development.

Kane co-founded Girl Geek Academy in 2014 with the goal of getting more "women into tech". She cites the openness and hospitality of people in the Australian gaming industry which is composed of more independent studios compared to the United States. Kane expressed concern over opportunities for women in Australia in light of the 2024 Richard White scandal. Kane has been recognized for her understanding of "the challenges women face across the tech industry and through the STEM fields".

== Awards and honors ==
- In 2015, Kane was named as one of the "most influential women in games" by MCV Pacific
- In 2016, Kane received the VicScreen Women in Games Fellowship
- In 2017, Kane was included on the Forbes 30 under 30 list for Games

== See also ==
- List of women in the video game industry
- Video games in Australia
