= The Game Awards 2019 =

American video game awards

- Date: December 12, 2019
- Venue: Microsoft Theater, Los Angeles
- Country: United States
- Hosted by: Geoff Keighley
- Preshow host: Sydnee Goodman

Highlights
- Most awards: Disco Elysium (4)
- Most nominations: Death Stranding (10)
- Game of the Year: Sekiro: Shadows Die Twice
- Website: thegameawards.com

Online coverage
- Runtime: 2 hours, 40 minutes
- Viewership: 45.2 million
- Produced by: Geoff Keighley; Kimmie Kim
- Directed by: Richard Preuss

The Game Awards 2019 was an award show that honored the best video games of 2019. The event was produced and hosted by Geoff Keighley, creator and producer of The Game Awards, and was held to an invited audience at the Microsoft Theater in Los Angeles on December 12, 2019. The preshow ceremony was hosted by Sydnee Goodman. The event was live streamed across more than 50 digital platforms; it was the first to broadcast live in India and was simulcast in 53 movie theaters across the United States. The show featured musical performances from Chvrches, Grimes, and Green Day, and presentations from celebrity guests including Stephen Curry, Vin Diesel, Norman Reedus, and Michelle Rodriguez. In association with the event, a virtual games festival was held online, allowing free demos to be played through Steam over a 48-hour period.

Death Stranding received ten nominations, the most of any Game Awards to date, (Note: Death Stranding's ten nomination record was beaten by The Last of Us Part II's eleven nominations at The Game Awards 2020.) while Disco Elysium tied for the highest-awarded game in the show's history with four wins. (Note: Disco Elysium's four win record was tied with 2016's Overwatch and 2018's Red Dead Redemption 2. It was beaten by The Last of Us Part II's seven wins in 2020.) Sekiro: Shadows Die Twice was awarded Game of the Year. Several new games were revealed during the show, including Bravely Default II, Godfall, and Senua's Saga: Hellblade II, and Microsoft revealed the Xbox Series X as the successor to the Xbox One. Death Stranding's nominations prompted allegations of impropriety due to Keighley's friendship with game director Hideo Kojima; Keighley clarified he does not partake in voting. Reviews for the ceremony were mixed, with praise for announcements but criticism directed at the decreasing focus on awards. The show was viewed by over 45 million streams, the most in its history to date, (Note: The viewership record was beaten in 2020 with 83 million streams.) with 7.5 million concurrent viewers at its peak.

== Background ==
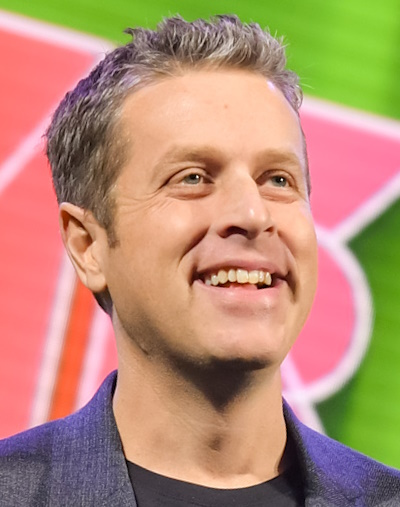
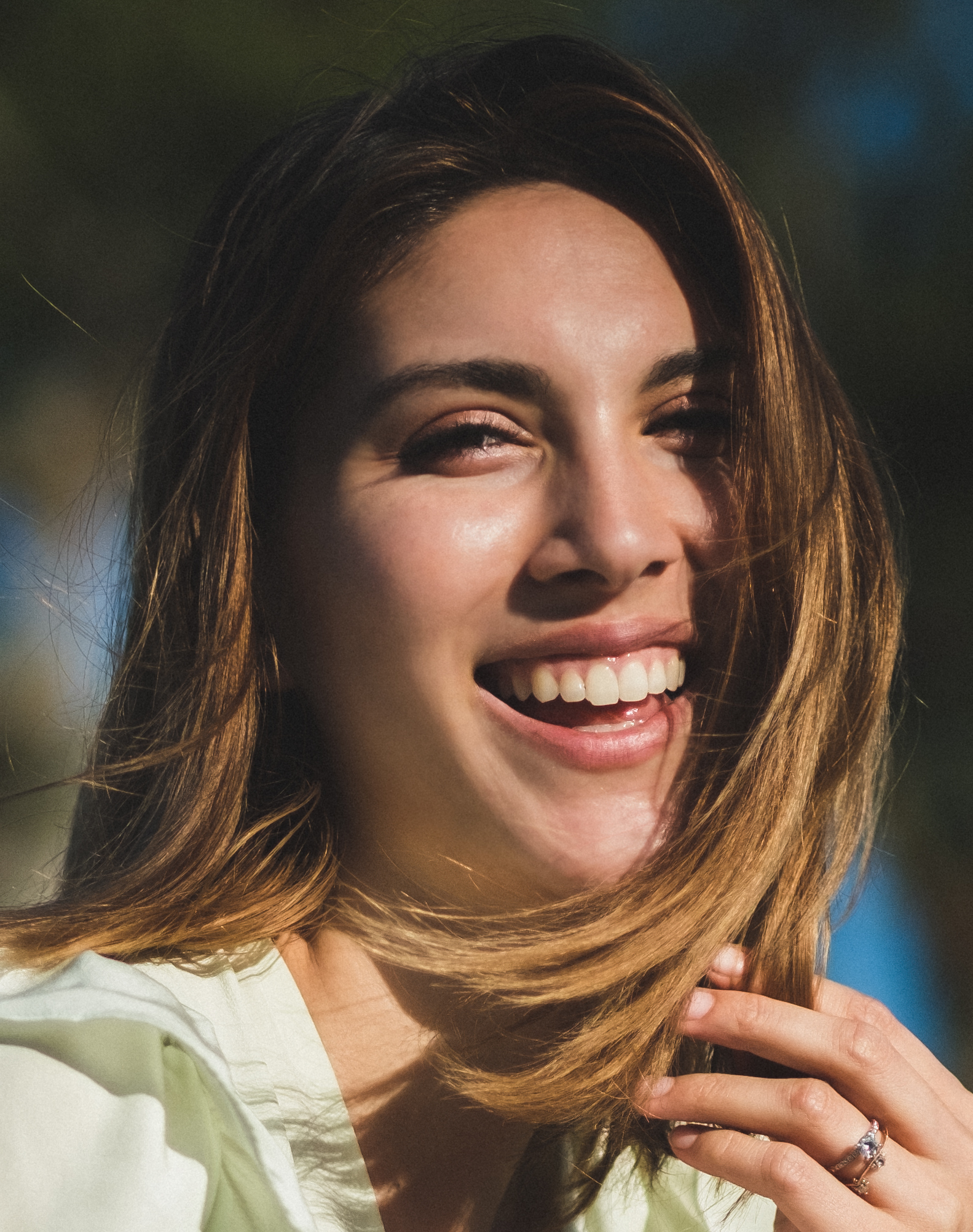
Show creator and producer Geoff Keighley (left) hosted the main show while Sydnee Goodman (right) hosted the preshow.

As with previous iterations of The Game Awards, the show was hosted and produced by Canadian games journalist Geoff Keighley. He returned as an executive producer alongside Kimmie H. Kim, and Richard Preuss and LeRoy Bennett returned as director and creative director, respectively. The preshow was hosted by Sydnee Goodman. The presentation was held at the Microsoft Theater in Los Angeles on December 12, 2019, and live streamed across more than 50 digital platforms, including Facebook, Twitch, Twitter, and YouTube. By partnering with Nodwin Gaming, the 2019 show was the first to broadcast live in India, on television via MTV and online through services such as JioTV, MX Player, and Voot. The show was simulcast in 53 Cinemark movie theaters across the United States alongside the opening night screening of Jumanji: The Next Level in partnership with Sony Pictures. Keighley had previously wanted to broadcast in theaters and felt the release of Jumanji—which largely focuses on a video game—was a perfect fit.

Keighley spent most of the year preparing for the show, as did about eight of the production's full-time staff; hundreds of contributors worked on the final show. In November, Kim worked 11-hour days to coordinate the show with contractors and decipher its pacing. During the ceremony, Keighley spoke to the animated character Mirage from Apex Legends for the announcement of the game's holiday event. The interaction took place in real-time, with actor Roger Craig Smith performing the movements through motion capture in a studio besides the Microsoft Theater. The game's creative director Drew Stauffer approached creative production studio The Mill in October 2018 with the idea. The Mill partnered with Cubic Motion to develop the technology, and with Animatrik for the motion capture movement. The production teams considered revealing the technology during the show, but opted to maintain the illusion until afterwards.

The show featured presenters such as Stephen Curry, Vin Diesel, and Norman Reedus, performances from Chvrches, Green Day, and Grimes. Keighley ensured the presenters and performers were relevant to the video games industry, wanting to avoid a "celebrity in the show for the sake of celebrity". Reggie Fils-Aimé's award presentation was his fifth for the show, and his first since retiring as president of Nintendo of America. The presentation from Bunsen Honeydew and Beaker marked the second appearance of Muppets, following Pepe the King Prawn's appearance at The Game Awards 2018. In association with the event, a virtual games festival was held online from December 12–14, 2019. Several upcoming games released free demos through Steam, including Carrion, Spiritfarer, and Skatebird, available for 48 hours.

=== Announcements ===
Valve announced it would showcase Half-Life: Alyx at the ceremony, but pulled out several hours prior to the event. Announcements on recently released and upcoming games were made for Apex Legends, Beat Saber, Black Desert Online, Control, Cyberpunk 2077, Gears Tactics, Ghost of Tsushima, Humankind, Magic: The Gathering Arena, New World, No More Heroes III, and Ori and the Will of the Wisps. New games announced during the ceremony included:

- Bravely Default II
- Convergence: A League of Legends Story
- Dungeons & Dragons: Dark Alliance
- Fast & Furious Crossroads
- Godfall
- Magic: Legends
- Naraka: Bladepoint
- Nine to Five
- Path of the Warrior
- Prologue
- Ruined King: A League of Legends Story
- Senua's Saga: Hellblade II
- Sons of the Forest
- Surgeon Simulator 2
- Ultimate Rivals: The Rink
- Weird West
- The Wolf Among Us 2

Additionally, Microsoft revealed the Xbox Series X as the successor to the Xbox One. The announcement was so secretive that Phil Spencer read a fake script about Xbox Game Pass during rehearsals. Godfall's reveal marked the first PlayStation 5 game to be announced.

== Winners and nominees ==
The nominees for The Game Awards 2019 were announced on November 19, 2019. Any game released on or before November 15, 2019, was eligible for consideration. The nominees were compiled by a jury panel with members from 80 media outlets globally. Winners were determined between the jury (90 percent) and public votes (10 percent); the latter was held via the official website. The exception was the Player's Voice award, fully nominated and voted-on by the public after three 24-hour votes that started with 24 games and ended with four. Public votes totaled 15.5 million, a 50 percent increase from the previous show. The show included new honorees of the Global Gaming Citizens award, in partnership with Facebook Gaming; two winners were announced at E3 2019, and the final three during the awards show alongside videos by Indie Game: The Movie directors Lisanne Pajot and James Swirsky.

=== Awards ===
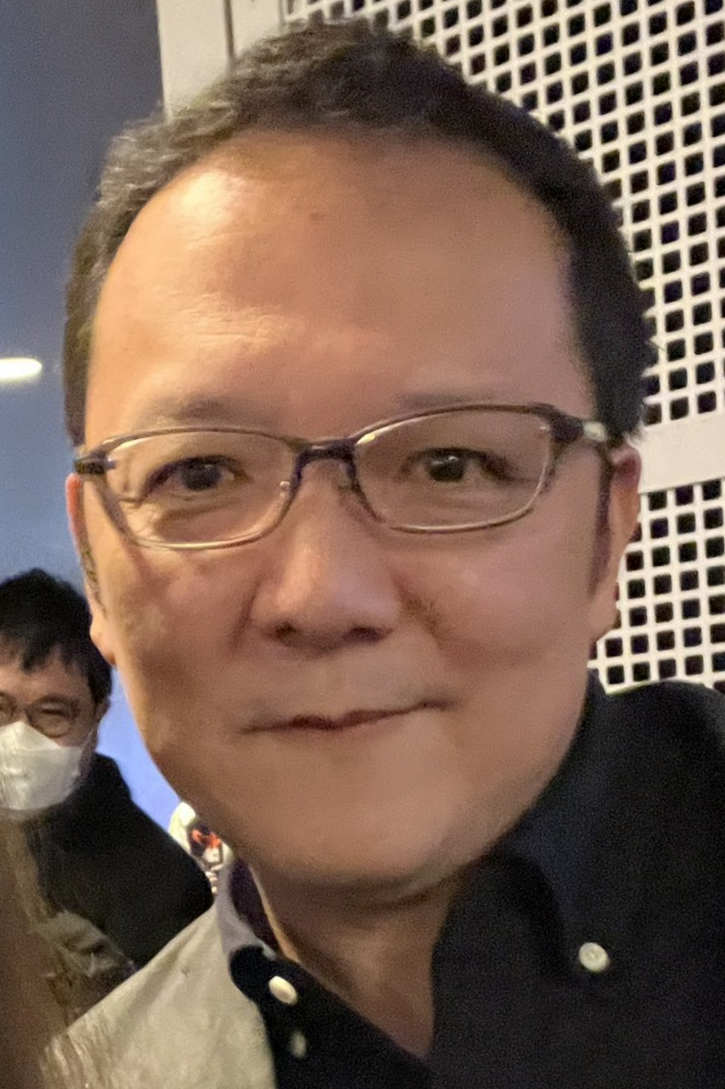
Hidetaka Miyazaki accepted Game of the Year for Sekiro: Shadows Die Twice.

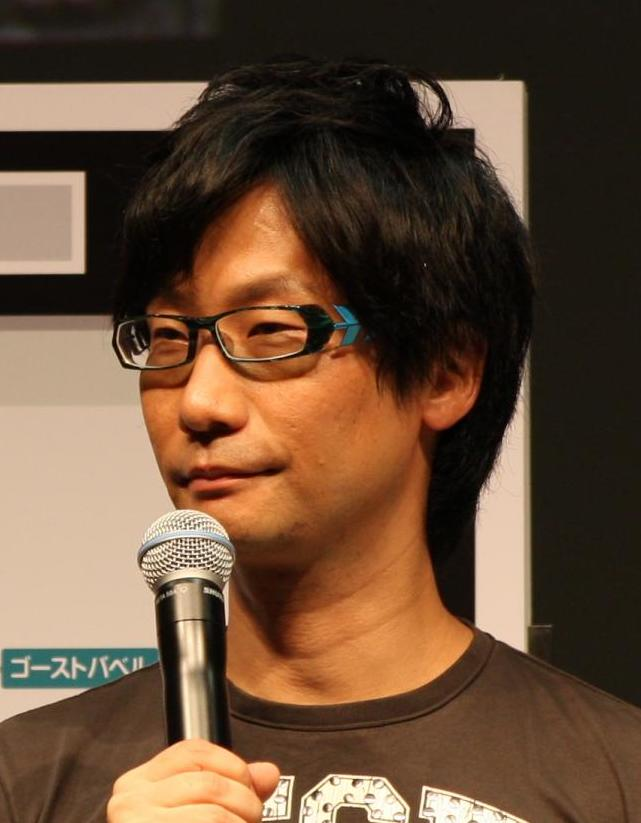
Hideo Kojima won Best Game Direction for Death Stranding.

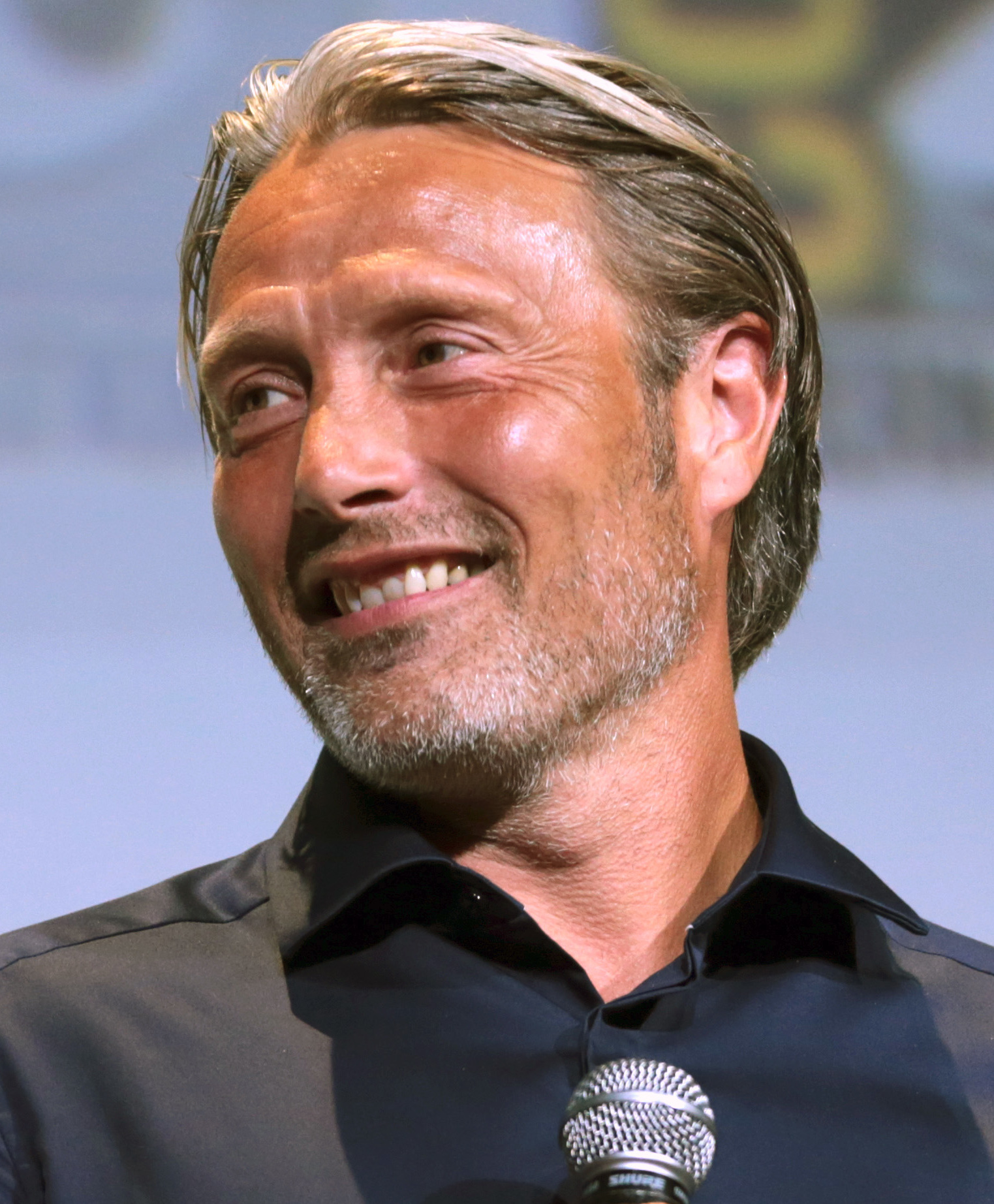
Mads Mikkelsen won Best Performance for his role as Cliff in Death Stranding.

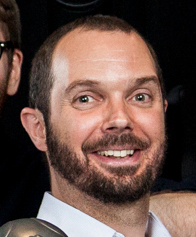
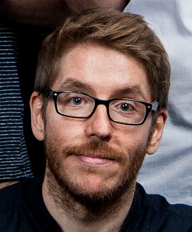
Adrián Cuevas and Roger Mendoza accepted Games for Impact for Gris.

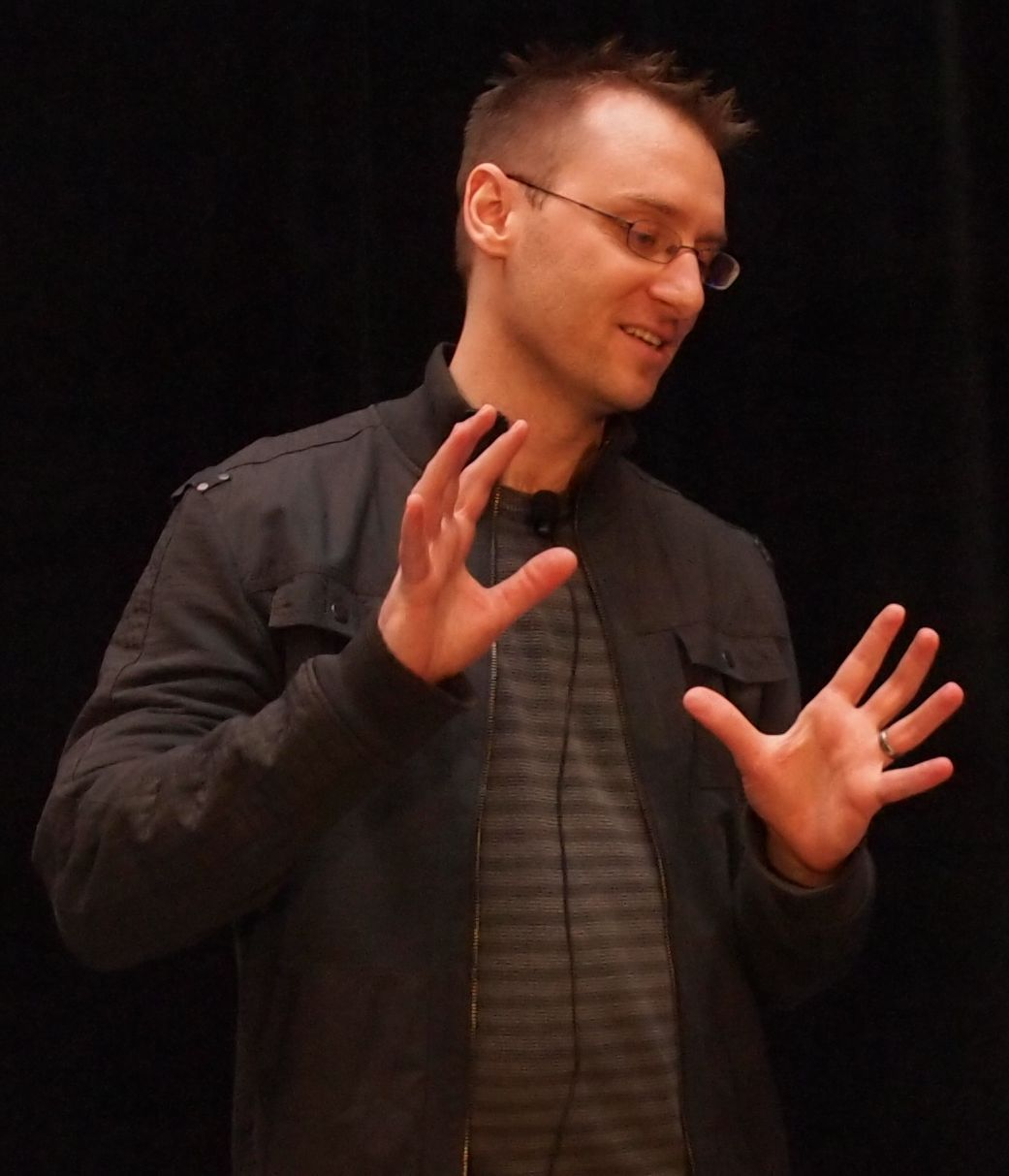
Donald Mustard accepted Best Ongoing Game for Fortnite.

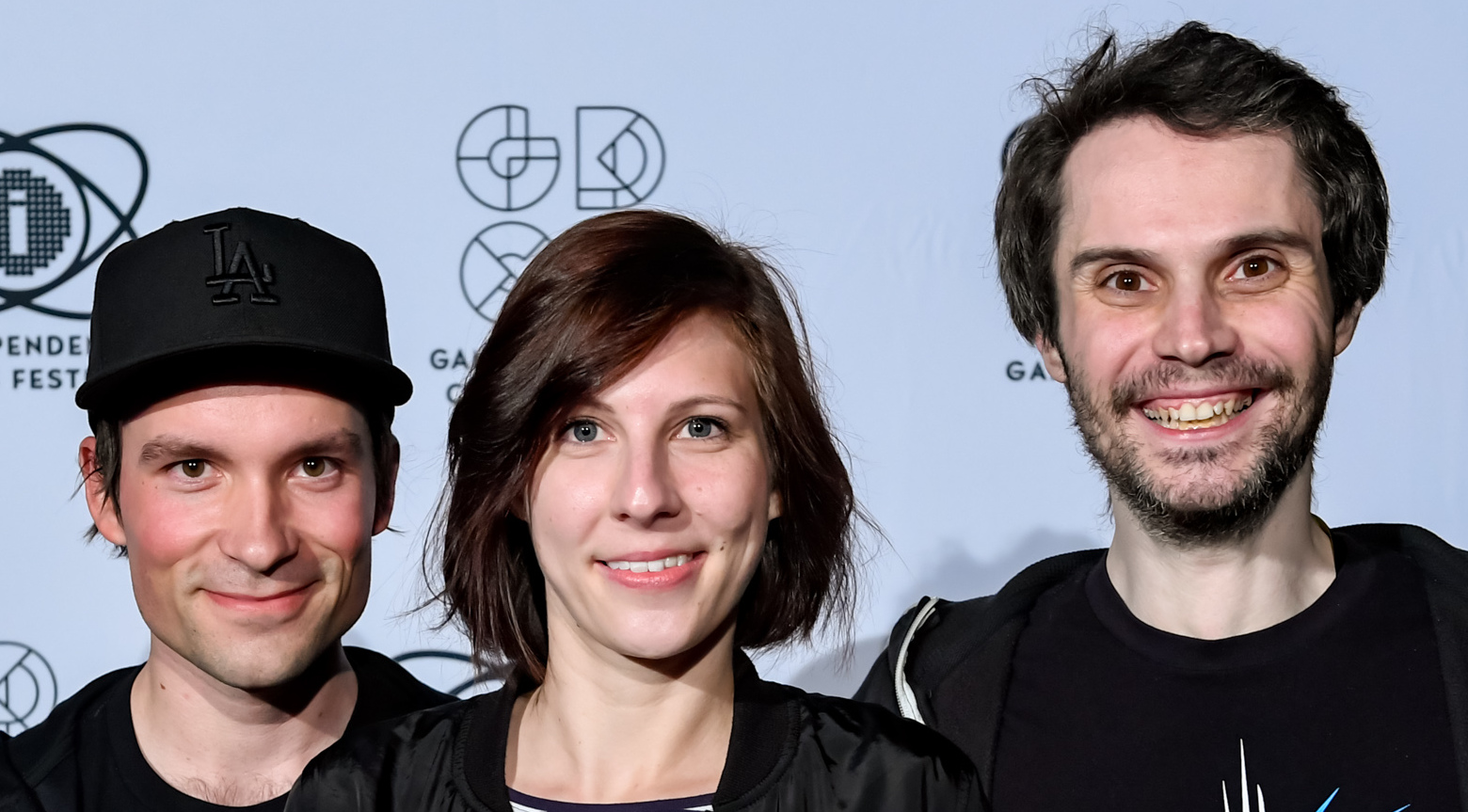
Beat Games was awarded Best VR/AR Game for Beat Saber.

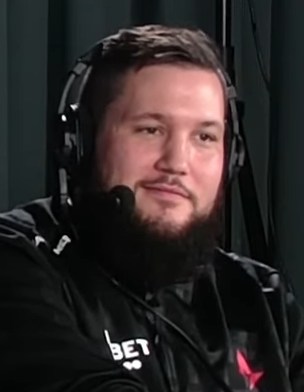
Danny "Zonic" Sørensen of Astralis won Best Esports Coach.

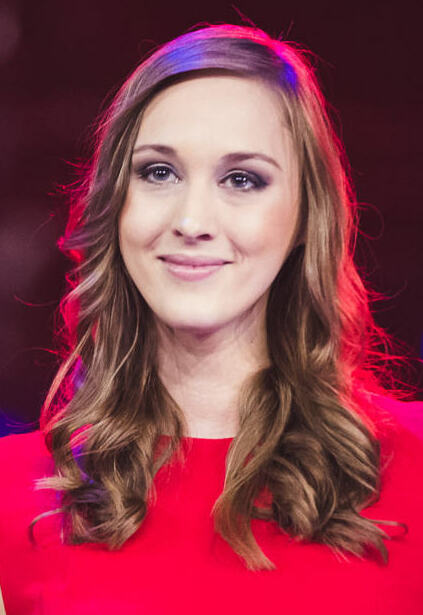
Sjokz won Best Esports Host for the second consecutive year.

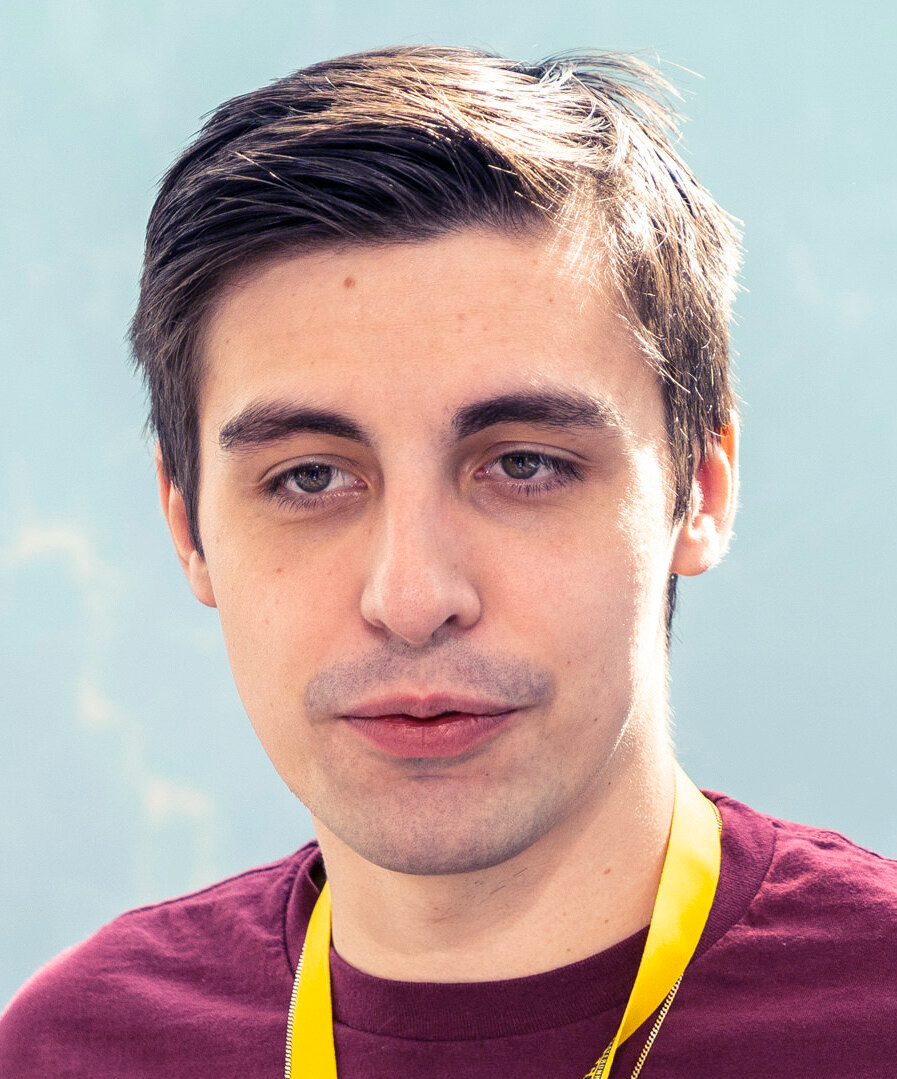
Shroud won Content Creator of the Year.

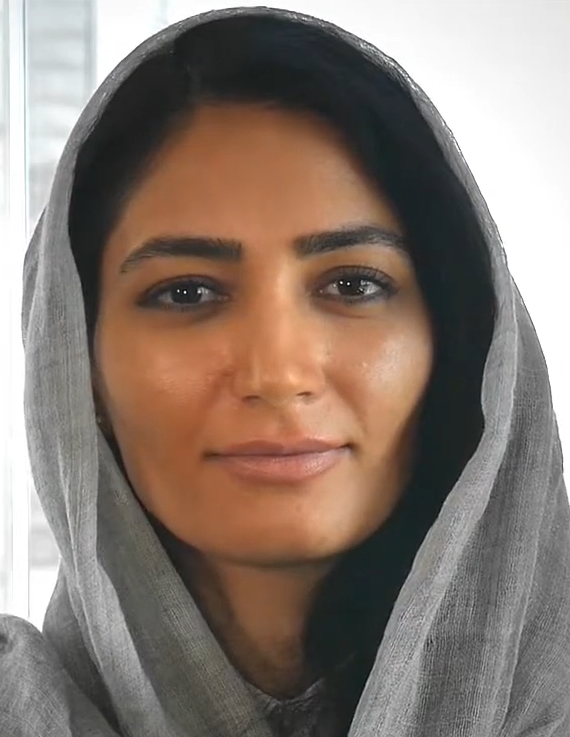
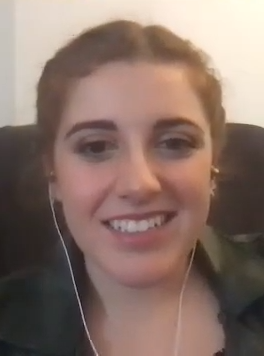
Fereshteh Forough (top) and Vanessa Gill (bottom) were named Global Gaming Citizens, among other honorees.

Winners are listed first, highlighted in boldface, and indicated with a double dagger (‡).

==== Video games ====
Game of the Year	Best Game Direction
**Sekiro: Shadows Die Twice – FromSoftware / Activision**‡; Control – Remedy Entertainment / 505 Games; Death Stranding – Kojima Productions / Sony Interactive Entertainment; The Outer Worlds – Obsidian Entertainment / Private Division; Resident Evil 2 – Capcom; Super Smash Bros. Ultimate – Bandai Namco Studios, Sora Ltd. / Nintendo	**Death Stranding – Kojima Productions / Sony Interactive Entertainment**‡; Control – Remedy Entertainment / 505 Games; Outer Wilds – Mobius Digital / Annapurna Interactive; Resident Evil 2 – Capcom; Sekiro: Shadows Die Twice – FromSoftware / Activision
Best Narrative	Best Art Direction
**Disco Elysium – ZA/UM**‡; A Plague Tale: Innocence – Asobo Studio / Focus Home Interactive; Control – Remedy Entertainment / 505 Games; Death Stranding – Kojima Productions / Sony Interactive Entertainment; The Outer Worlds – Obsidian Entertainment / Private Division	**Control – Remedy Entertainment / 505 Games**‡; Death Stranding – Kojima Productions / Sony Interactive Entertainment; Gris – Nomada Studio / Devolver Digital; The Legend of Zelda: Link's Awakening – Grezzo / Nintendo; Sayonara Wild Hearts – Simogo / Annapurna Interactive; Sekiro: Shadows Die Twice – FromSoftware / Activision
Best Score/Music	Best Audio Design
**Death Stranding – Kojima Productions / Sony Interactive Entertainment**‡; Cadence of Hyrule – Brace Yourself Games / Nintendo; Devil May Cry 5 – Capcom; Kingdom Hearts III – Square Enix Business Division 3 / Square Enix; Sayonara Wild Hearts – Simogo / Annapurna Interactive	**Call of Duty: Modern Warfare – Infinity Ward / Activision**‡; Control – Remedy Entertainment / 505 Games; Death Stranding – Kojima Productions / Sony Interactive Entertainment; Gears 5 – The Coalition / Xbox Game Studios; Resident Evil 2 – Capcom; Sekiro: Shadows Die Twice – FromSoftware / Activision
Best Performance	Games for Impact
**Mads Mikkelsen as Cliff – Death Stranding**‡; Laura Bailey as Kait Diaz – Gears 5; Ashly Burch as Parvati Holcomb – The Outer Worlds; Courtney Hope as Jesse Faden – Control; Matthew Porretta as Dr. Casper Darling – Control; Norman Reedus as Sam Porter Bridges – Death Stranding	**Gris – Nomada Studio / Devolver Digital**‡; Concrete Genie – Pixelopus / Sony Interactive Entertainment; Kind Words – Popcannibal; Life Is Strange 2 – Dontnod / Square Enix; Sea of Solitude – Jo-Mei Games / Electronic Arts
Best Ongoing Game	Best Independent Game
**Fortnite** – **Epic Games** ‡; Apex Legends – Respawn Entertainment / Electronic Arts; Destiny 2 – Bungie; Final Fantasy XIV – Square Enix; Tom Clancy's Rainbow Six Siege – Ubisoft	**Disco Elysium – ZA/UM**‡; Baba Is You – Hempuli; Katana Zero – Askiisoft / Devolver Digital; Outer Wilds – Mobius Digital / Annapurna Interactive; Untitled Goose Game – House House / Panic
Best Mobile Game	Best VR/AR Game
**Call of Duty: Mobile – TiMi Studios / Activision**‡; Grindstone – Capybara Games; Sayonara Wild Hearts – Simogo / Annapurna Interactive; Sky: Children of the Light – Thatgamecompany; What the Golf? – Triband	**Beat Saber – Beat Games**‡; Asgard's Wrath – Sanzaru Games / Oculus Studios; Blood & Truth – London Studio / Sony Interactive Entertainment; No Man's Sky – Hello Games; Trover Saves the Universe – Squanch Games / Gearbox Publishing
Best Action Game	Best Action/Adventure Game
**Devil May Cry 5 – Capcom**‡; Apex Legends – Respawn Entertainment / Electronic Arts; Astral Chain – PlatinumGames / Nintendo; Call of Duty: Modern Warfare – Infinity Ward / Activision; Gears 5 – The Coalition / Xbox Game Studios; Metro Exodus – 4A Games / Deep Silver	**Sekiro: Shadows Die Twice – FromSoftware / Activision**‡; Borderlands 3 – Gearbox Software / 2K Games; Control – Remedy Entertainment / 505 Games; Death Stranding – Kojima Productions / Sony Interactive Entertainment; The Legend of Zelda: Link's Awakening – Grezzo / Nintendo; Resident Evil 2 – Capcom
Best Role Playing Game	Best Fighting Game
**Disco Elysium – ZA/UM**‡; Final Fantasy XIV – Square Enix; Kingdom Hearts III – Square Enix Business Division 3 / Square Enix; Monster Hunter World: Iceborne – Capcom; The Outer Worlds – Obsidian Entertainment / Private Division	**Super Smash Bros. Ultimate – Bandai Namco Studios, Sora Ltd. / Nintendo**‡; Dead or Alive 6 – Team Ninja / Koei Tecmo; Jump Force – Spike Chunsoft / Bandai Namco; Mortal Kombat 11 – NetherRealm / Warner Bros. Interactive Entertainment; Samurai Shodown – SNK Corporation / Athlon Games
Best Family Game	Best Strategy Game
**Luigi's Mansion 3 – Next Level Games / Nintendo**‡; Ring Fit Adventure – Nintendo; Super Mario Maker 2 – Nintendo; Super Smash Bros. Ultimate – Bandai Namco Studios, Sora Ltd. / Nintendo; Yoshi's Crafted World – Good-Feel / Nintendo	**Fire Emblem: Three Houses – Intelligent Systems, Koei Tecmo / Nintendo**‡; Age of Wonders: Planetfall – Triumph Studios / Paradox Interactive; Anno 1800 – Blue Byte / Ubisoft; Total War: Three Kingdoms – Creative Assembly / Sega; Tropico 6 – Limbic Entertainment / Kalypso Media; Wargroove – Chucklefish
Best Sports/Racing Game	Best Multiplayer Game
**Crash Team Racing Nitro-Fueled – Beenox / Activision**‡; Dirt Rally 2.0 – Codemasters; eFootball Pro Evolution Soccer 2020 – PES Productions / Konami; F1 2019 – Codemasters; FIFA 20 – EA Vancouver, EA Romania / EA Sports	**Apex Legends – Respawn Entertainment / Electronic Arts**‡; Borderlands 3 – Gearbox Software / 2K Games; Call of Duty: Modern Warfare – Infinity Ward / Activision; Tetris 99 – Arika / Nintendo; Tom Clancy's The Division 2 – Massive Entertainment / Ubisoft
Fresh Indie Game (Note: Awarded for the best debut game by an indie studio in 2019)	Best Community Support
**Disco Elysium – ZA/UM**‡; Gris – Nomada Studio; My Friend Pedro – DeadToast Entertainment; Outer Wilds – Mobius Digital; Slay the Spire – MegaCrit; Untitled Goose Game – House House	**Destiny 2 – Bungie**‡; Apex Legends – Respawn Entertainment / Electronic Arts; Final Fantasy XIV – Square Enix; Fortnite – Epic Games; Tom Clancy's Rainbow Six Siege – Ubisoft
Player's Voice (Note: 100 percent fan-voted award that had a three-round nomination process that began with 24 games. Fire Emblem: Three Houses won with 45 percent of the vote, followed by Super Smash Bros. Ultimate with 22 percent.)
1. **Fire Emblem: Three Houses – Intelligent Systems, Koei Tecmo / Nintendo**‡; 2. Super Smash Bros. Ultimate – Bandai Namco Studios, Sora Ltd. / Nintendo; 3. Star Wars Jedi: Fallen Order – Respawn Entertainment / Electronic Arts; 4. Death Stranding – Kojima Productions / Sony Interactive Entertainment

==== Esports and creators ====
Best Esports Game	Best Esports Player
**League of Legends – Riot Games**‡; Counter-Strike: Global Offensive – Valve; Dota 2 – Valve; Fortnite – Epic Games; Overwatch – Blizzard Entertainment	**Kyle "Bugha" Giersdorf (Sentinels, Fortnite)**‡; Oleksandr "S1mple" Kostyliev (Natus Vincere, Counter-Strike: Global Offensive); Luka "Perkz" Perkovic (G2 Esports, League of Legends); Lee "Faker" Sang-hyeok (SK Telecom T1, League of Legends); Jay "Sinatraa" Won (San Francisco Shock, Overwatch League)
Best Esports Team	Best Esports Coach
**G2 Esports (League of Legends)**‡; Astralis (Counter-Strike: Global Offensive); OG (Dota 2); San Francisco Shock (Overwatch League); Team Liquid (Counter-Strike: Global Offensive)	**Danny "Zonic" Sørensen (Astralis, Counter-Strike: Global Offensive)**‡; Eric "adreN" Hoag (Team Liquid, Counter-Strike: Global Offensive); Nu-ri "Cain" Jang (Team Liquid, League of Legends); Kim "Kkoma" Jeong-gyun (SK Telecom T1, League of Legends); Fabian "GrabbZ" Lohmann (G2 Esports, League of Legends); Titouan "Sockshka" Merloz (OG, Dota 2)
Best Esports Event	Best Esports Host
**2019 League of Legends World Championship**‡; 2019 Overwatch League Grand Finals; EVO 2019; Fortnite World Cup; IEM Katowice 2019; The International 2019	**Eefje "Sjokz" Depoortere**‡; Paul "Redeye" Chaloner; Alex "Goldenboy" Mendez; Alex "Machine" Richardson; Duan "Candice" Yu-Shuang
Content Creator of the Year	Global Gaming Citizens (Note: Presented in conjunction with Facebook Gaming)
**Michael "Shroud" Grzesiek**‡; Jack "CouRage" Dunlop; Benjamin "DrLupo" Lupo; David "Grefg" Martínez; Soleil "EwOk" Wheeler	**Fereshteh Forough**, Code to Inspire; **Damon Packwood**, Gameheads; **Luke**, Let's Be Well; **Vanessa Gill**, Social Cipher; **Stephen Machuga** and **Mat Bergendahl**, StackUp

=== Games with multiple nominations and awards ===
==== Multiple nominations ====
Death Stranding received ten nominations, the most in the show's history to date. Other games with multiple nominations included Control with eight and Sekiro: Shadows Die Twice with five. Nintendo had 15 total nominations, more than any other publisher, followed by Sony Interactive Entertainment with 12 and Activision with 10.

Games that received multiple nominations
Nominations	Game
10	Death Stranding
8	Control
5	Sekiro: Shadows Die Twice
4	Apex Legends
4	Disco Elysium
4	The Outer Worlds
4	Resident Evil 2
4	Super Smash Bros. Ultimate
3	Call of Duty: Modern Warfare
3	Final Fantasy XIV
3	Fortnite
3	Gears 5
3	Gris
3	Outer Wilds
3	Sayonara Wild Hearts
2	Borderlands 3
2	Destiny 2
2	Devil May Cry 5
2	Fire Emblem: Three Houses
2	Kingdom Hearts III
2	The Legend of Zelda: Link's Awakening
2	Tom Clancy's Rainbow Six Siege
2	Untitled Goose Game

Nominations by publisher
Nominations	Publisher
15	Nintendo
12	Sony Interactive Entertainment
10	Activision
8	505 Games
7	Capcom
7	Electronic Arts
6	Annapurna Interactive
6	Square Enix
4	Devolver Digital
4	Private Division
4	Ubisoft
4	ZA/UM
3	Epic Games
3	Xbox Game Studios
2	2K Games
2	Bungie
2	Codemasters
2	Panic
2	Valve

==== Multiple awards ====
Disco Elysium received the most awards, winning all four of its nominations, tying for the highest-awarded game in the show's history to date. Death Stranding won three awards, while Fire Emblem: Three Houses and Sekiro: Shadows Die Twice won two. Activision was the most successful publisher, with five total wins, while Nintendo and ZA/UM won four.

Games that received multiple wins
Awards	Game
4	Disco Elysium
3	Death Stranding
2	Fire Emblem: Three Houses
2	Sekiro: Shadows Die Twice

Wins by publisher
Awards	Publisher
5	Activision
4	Nintendo
4	ZA/UM
3	Sony Interactive Entertainment

== Presenters and performers ==
=== Presenters ===
The following individuals, listed in order of appearance, presented awards or introduced trailers. All other awards and trailers were presented by Goodman in the preshow and Keighley in the main show.

Name	Role
Lual Mayen	Presented the reveal trailer for Salaam in the preshow
Jeff Spock	Presented the gameplay trailer for Humankind in the preshow
Jonathan Nolan	Presented the award for Best Narrative
Phil Spencer	Presented the reveal trailer for Xbox Series X and Senua's Saga: Hellblade II
Stephen Curry	Presented the award for Best Esports Player
Keith Lee	Presented the reveal trailer for Godfall
Steve Gibson	Presented the reveal trailer for Godfall
Rebecca Ford	Presented the trailer for Warframe: Empyrean
Daniel Ketchum	Presented the Theros: Beyond Death trailer for Magic: The Gathering Arena
Ikumi Nakamura	Presented the award for Best Art Direction
Donald Mustard	Presented a teaser for the Fortnite collaboration with Star Wars: The Rise of Skywalker
Joe Madureira	Presented the gameplay reveal trailer for Ruined King: A League of Legends Story
Norman Reedus	Presented the award for Best Action Game
Jeff Hattem	Presented the reveal trailer for Dungeons & Dragons: Dark Alliance
Mirage (Note: Animated character from Apex Legends portrayed by Roger Craig Smith)	Presented the Holo-Day Bash Event trailer for Apex Legends
Bunsen Honeydew	Presented the award for Games for Impact
Beaker	Presented the award for Games for Impact
Raphaël Colantonio	Presented the reveal trailer for Weird West
Julien Roby	Presented the reveal trailer for Weird West
Ninja	Presented the award for Best Multiplayer Game
Sydnee Goodman	Presented the award for Best Ongoing Game
Matias Myllyrinne	Presented the reveal trailer for Nine to Five
Reggie Fils-Aimé	Presented the award for Fresh Indie Game
Lee Thomas	Presented the reveal trailer for Convergence: A League of Legends Story
Alex "Goldenboy" Mendez	Presented the winner of the Samsung QLED television
Ashly Burch	Presented the award for Best Game Direction
Michelle Rodriguez	Presented the reveal trailer for Fast & Furious Crossroads and introduced Vin Diesel
Vin Diesel	Presented the award for Game of the Year

=== Performers ===
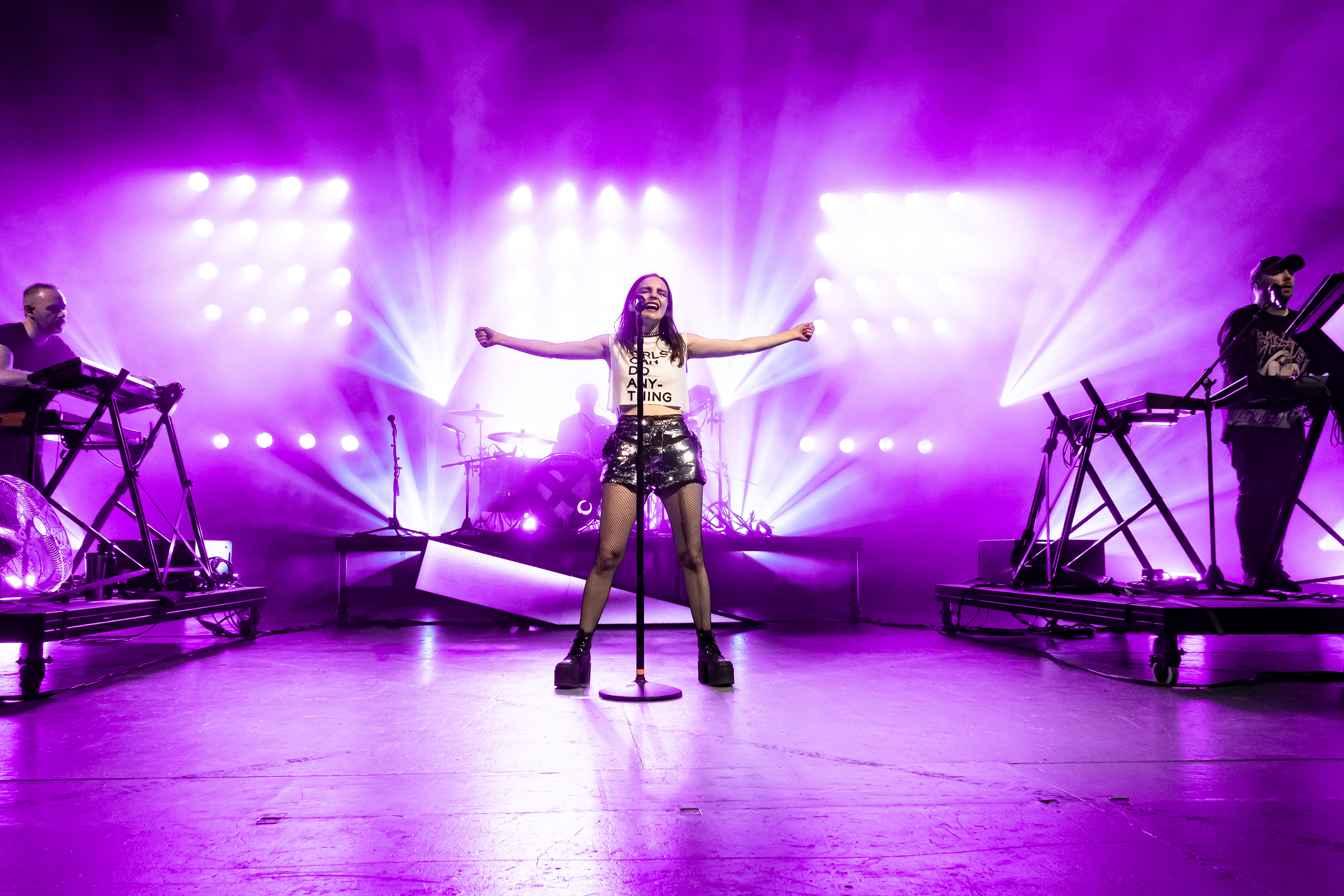
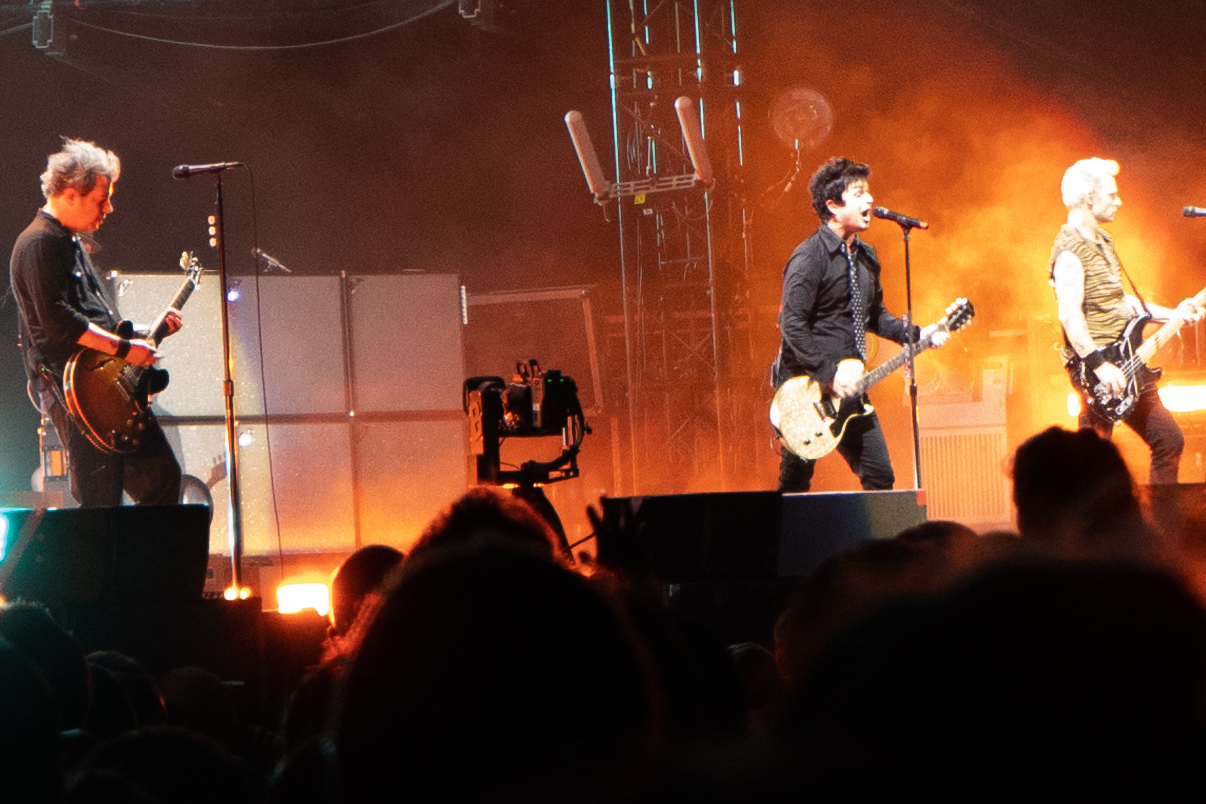
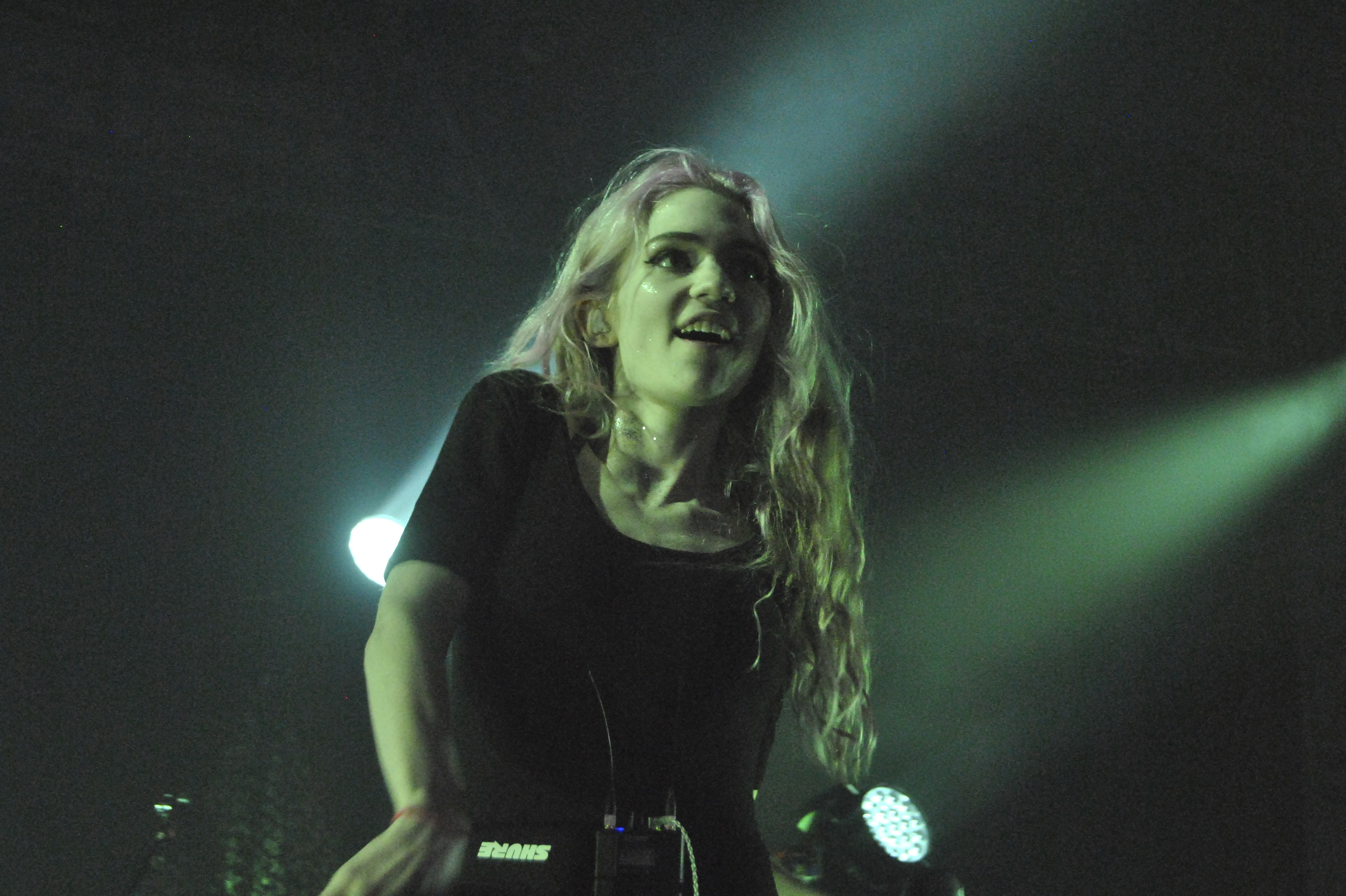
Chvrches (top), Green Day (center), and Grimes (bottom) performed music from Death Stranding, Beat Saber, and Cyberpunk 2077, respectively.

The following individuals or groups performed musical numbers.

Name	Song	Game(s)
Chvrches	"Death Stranding"	Death Stranding
Grimes	"4ÆM"	Cyberpunk 2077
The Game Awards Orchestra (Note: Conducted by Max Aruj)	"Way of the Ghost"	Ghost of Tsushima
Green Day	"Welcome to Paradise"	Beat Saber
Green Day	"Father of All..."	Beat Saber
The Game Awards Orchestra	Game of the Year medley (Note: The Game of the Year medley's songs included: "Hope" from The Outer Worlds; "BB's Theme" from Death Stranding; "Lifelight" from Super Smash Bros. Ultimate; "Sankarin Tango" from Control; "Sekiro (The One-Armed Wolf)" from Sekiro: Shadows Die Twice; "Saudade" from Resident Evil 2)	Control (Note: Performed with Jan Simons)
The Game Awards Orchestra	Game of the Year medley	Death Stranding
The Game Awards Orchestra	Game of the Year medley	The Outer Worlds
The Game Awards Orchestra	Game of the Year medley	Resident Evil 2
The Game Awards Orchestra	Game of the Year medley	Sekiro: Shadows Die Twice
The Game Awards Orchestra	Game of the Year medley	Super Smash Bros. Ultimate

== Ratings and reception ==
=== Nominees ===
USgamer's Eric Van Allen criticized the Game of the Year nominees for favoring The Outer Worlds over games like Disco Elysium, Fire Emblem: Three Houses, and Outer Wilds; he similarly expressed his surprise that Death Stranding received so many nominations. He appreciated the indie game nominations in most categories but felt they were unfairly ignored for Game of the Year. Game Rant's Dalton Cooper named Astral Chain, Devil May Cry 5, and Fire Emblem: Three Houses the biggest snubs. Inverse's Jen Glennon felt Fire Emblem: Three Houses was snubbed in categories like Best Art Direction and Best Audio Design, and considered its Best Strategy Game nomination inappropriate as it is a role-playing game. PC Gamer's Andy Chalk expressed his confusion of Fresh Indie Game nominees as several had created prior games despite the category's intention for first-time developers.

Death Stranding's record ten nominations prompted allegations of impropriety and a conflict of interest due to Keighley's friendly relationship with game director Hideo Kojima and his cameo appearance in the game. Keighley said he understood and appreciated the concern but reiterated he does not partake in the jury nominations or award selections, noting he intentionally distances himself due to his close working relationship with developers and publishers. Additionally, while Kojima sits on the advisory board for the Game Awards, Keighley asserted the board had no direct influence on the selections. Kotaku's Heather Alexandra wrote that the close relationship would continue to reflect poorly on the ceremony, regardless of Keighley's clarification.

=== Ceremony ===
The show received a mixed reception from media publications. CNET's Jackson Ryan found the show "felt like one giant advert" but praised some of the announcements, including the Xbox Series X, Hellblade II, and Weird West, as well as the performance by Chvrches. IGN's Matt T.M. Kim similarly praised some of the surprise reveals but felt the show focused more heavily on trailers than awards. Pocket Gamer's Matthew Forde wrote mobile games have no place at The Game Awards—both for announcements and awards—due to incompatible audiences; he felt a separate presentation like Nintendo Direct would be more appropriate. PC Gamer's Chalk found the show lacked "mega-blockbuster game reveals" like The Elder Scrolls or Mass Effect. Vice's Patrick Klepek praised Disco Elysium's awards success, and TheGamer's Patricio Kobek suspected it would shape future games and hoped it would lead to more experimental developers.

=== Viewership ===
The Game Awards 2019 was the most-viewed ceremony to date, a feat that surprised Keighley as he suspected the show had hit its peak in 2018. Over 45.2 million streams were used to view the show, an increase of 73 percent from the 2018 ceremony's 26.2 million. At its peak, the show had over 7.5 million concurrent viewers, including over 2 million across Twitch and YouTube. The show had increased viewership in China, which Keighley partly attributed to the League of Legends announcements. The increased viewership reassured Keighley that a digital show was more effective than a television broadcast. He partly attributed the viewership increase to "a general rise in live-streaming" but felt it was difficult to cite a specific factor.
