= Tchia =

2023 action-adventure video game

- Developer: Awaceb
- Publishers: Awaceb; Kepler Interactive
- Director: Phil Crifo
- Designer: Phil Crifo
- Writer: Phil Crifo
- Composer: John Robert Matz
- Engine: Unreal Engine 4
- Platforms: PlayStation 4; PlayStation 5; Windows; Nintendo Switch; Xbox Series X/S
- Release: PlayStation 4, PlayStation 5, Windows; March 21, 2023; Nintendo Switch; June 27, 2024; Xbox Series X/S; July 11, 2024
- Genre: Action-adventure
- Mode: Single-player

Tchia is an action-adventure game developed by Awaceb and published by Kepler Interactive. The player controls the titular character as she explores a fictional archipelago inspired by New Caledonia. The game was released for PlayStation 4, PlayStation 5 and Windows on March 21, 2023. It was also released for Nintendo Switch on June 27, 2024 and for Xbox Series X/S on July 11, 2024.

== Gameplay ==
The titular character exploring the archipelago via a raft

Tchia is an action-adventure video game played from a third-person perspective. The player assumes control of the titular protagonist, who must explore a tropical archipelago to rescue her kidnapped father. Tchia has the ability of "soul jumping", which allows her to possess and assume control of animals and inanimate objects found in the world, and uses their power to travel to new areas, solve puzzles, and defend herself against opponents. For instance, by soul jumping to a dog, players can use its ability to dig out treasure maps. According to developer Phil Crifo, players can soul jump to more than 30 animals and "hundreds of" objects.

Tchia can explore the archipelago in her human form. She is equipped with a glider and a raft which allows her to navigate between places quickly. Tchia is highly acrobatic. She can quickly slide down a mountain, climb up trees and use it to catapult herself across the canopy, and ascend nearly all types of surfaces. Through exploration, players will discover different points of interest, minigames, and chests with cosmetic items, meet other non-playable characters, and complete side quests. Tchia features elements from rhythm games, as players can play Tchia's ukulele at will. Players can play "Soul-Melodies", which allows Tchia to perform feats such as summoning animals for soul jumping, altering the time of day, or changing the in-game weather. These gameplay sequences are skippable. Tchia's appearance, as well as her glider and her raft, can be extensively customized.

== Plot ==
The game opens with a young boy being brought to an orphanage. Looking to help make him comfortable, the old woman in charge tells him the story of Tchia.

Tchia and her father Joxu live alone on the island of Uma, occasionally visited by their friend Tre. On Tchia's twelfth birthday, an airship lands on the island and a man named Pwi Dua emerges, kidnapping Joxu. Tchia attempts to stop him and discovers that she has the ability to soul jump, letting her possess creatures and inanimate objects, but fails to stop him from escaping before she falls into the ocean. Tchia wakes up in Tre's camp, who reveals that Joxu is being held captive by Meavora. Knowing he's sending people to abduct him too, Tre gives Tchia his boat so she can escape and rescue her father.

Tchia arrives at the city of Aëmoon and heads to Meavora's palace of Ga Ngazo looking for him. However, she's turned away by the secretary until she brings certain items as a gift. Tchia travels to the village of Hunahmi and meets their chief, who paints her face and teaches her how to carve totems. She then travels to Weliwele, where she meets their matriarch Gaby and her daughter Louise, the latter of whom Tchia starts up a romantic relationship with. The Chief of Hunahmi and Gaby provide Tchia with the gift she needs, and she goes back to Ga Ngazo to meet with Meavora. There she discovers that Meavora is a demon that eats children and babies. She's recognized by Pwi Dua, who attempts to capture her, but she is saved at the last minute by a mysterious Masked Warrior.

Awaking on the island of Ieji Sinöe, Tchia meets with its guardian, Kavere. There Kavere reveals that Tchia's father and missing mother were the king and queen of the islands and that they had a son and daughter with soul-jumping powers. Pwi Dua, afraid of these powers, turned the people against them and performed a coup with Meavora. Joxu managed to save Tchia and went into hiding with her. Tchia, worried that Meavora will go after Louise, leaves Ieji Sinöe to go warn her. However, she discovers that Louise, Gaby, and the Hunahmi Chief have all been captured. Tchia shuts down Meavora's fabric factories to try and save them, but Pwi Dua traps them and her father inside one and sets off a bomb, killing him, Gaby, and the Huahmi Chief. Once again, Tchia is saved by the Masked Warrior, who brings her back to Uma. There the warrior reveals she is Heia, Tchia's mother, and the two bury Joxu.

The next day they go back to Ieji Sinöe, where Kavere tells the other half of her story. While Tchia got away, Pwi Dua captured her baby brother Makanu and fed him to Meavora, giving him his powers. Kavere saved Heia and trained her to become the Masked Warrior so she could get revenge. Kavere gives them an artifact that can revert Meavora into his original form of a worm and Tchia and Heia go back to Ga Ngazo. While there, Tchia offers her life in exchange for Tre, and Meavora agrees and consumes Tchia. Inside his stomach, Tchia discovers that both Louise and Makanu are still alive. She uses the artifact to stop his heart and forces Meavora to vomit up all the consumed children before turning back into a worm, at which point Heia kills him. Outraged, Pwi Dua mortally wounds Makanu before escaping. Tre reveals that he has healing powers, and brings Makanu back to life in exchange for his own.

Afterward, Heia is once again made queen of the island, and begins to raise her kids. Funerals are held for the characters that died. An orphanage is built on Tchia's old home in Uma, which Kavere leaves Ieji Sinöe to run. Louise is adopted by Kavere, and she and Tchia continue their relationship.

In a post-credits scene, it's revealed that the woman telling the story is an older Louise. She and Tchia are still together in their old age, and now run the orphanage together.

== Development ==
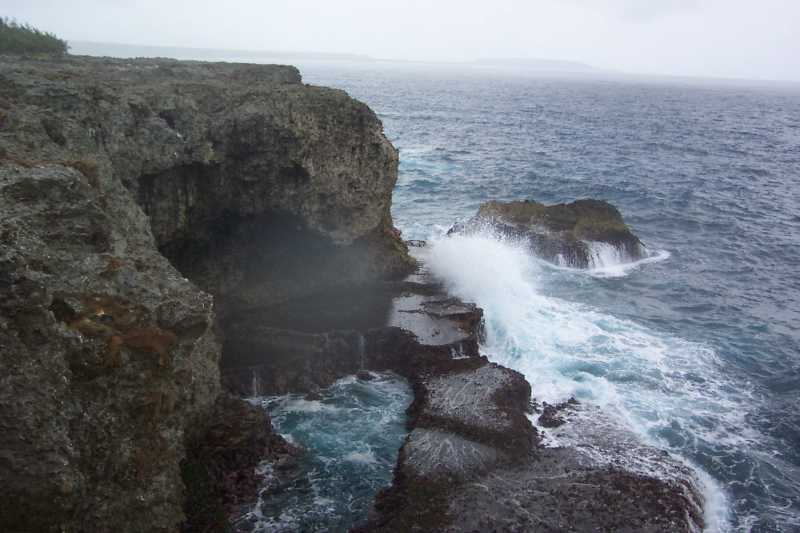
The team travelled to the island of Lifou, New Caledonia to conduct research and recruit voice talents.

Tchia was developed by Montreal-based studio Awaceb. The setting is fictional; it was heavily inspired by New Caledonia, a Pacific nation within the French Republic where the founders of Aweceb, Thierry Boura and Phil Crifo, grew up. In particular, Kanak culture was a major source of inspiration for the team. One of the goals for the studio was to "show what it was like exploring New Caledonia" when the two were still kids. Most members of the studio travelled to Lifou for two weeks to conduct research, as well as showing a demo to the indigenous population. Similar to the natives in New Caledonia, the characters speak French and Drehu; as there were no professional voice actors who spoke Drehu, the studio had a difficult time recruiting people to record lines for the game. The character of Tchia was described to be "curious" and "a bit naïve". As she slowly explores the world, she gradually meets different non-playable characters and helps resolve their conflicts, breaking down the wall between different communities. The soul-jumping ability was inspired by New Caledonia's folklore about shapeshifting.

The team received funding from Kowloon Nights in August 2019 for the development of Tchia, then known as "Project Caillou". It was co-published by Kepler Interactive, a publishing label jointly operated by several independent game developers including Awaceb. Tchia uses the Unreal Engine. It was announced during The Game Awards 2020. The game was originally set to be released in 2022; it was delayed to 2023. Tchia was released for Microsoft Windows, PlayStation 4 and PlayStation 5 on March 21, 2023. Maximum Games released the game's physical version for PS4 and PS5 on July 18, 2023. The Windows release was as a one year timed exclusive for the Epic Games Store and released afterwards on Steam. It was released on Nintendo Switch on June 27, 2024 and for Xbox Series consoles, Microsoft Store on PC, and Xbox Cloud Gaming via Xbox Game Pass on July 11, 2024.

== Reception ==
Reception

Aggregate score
Aggregator	Score
Metacritic	(PC) 76/100 (PS5) 77/100

Review scores
Publication	Score
Destructoid	8.5/10
Digital Trends	4/5 stars
Easy Allies	8/10
Game Informer	8.5/10
GamesRadar+	4/5 stars
Hardcore Gamer	3.5/5
PC Gamer (US)	90/100
Push Square	7/10 stars
Shacknews	9/10

Tchia received "generally favorable" reviews, according to review aggregator Metacritic. By May 2023, over 1 million copies have been sold.

PC Gamer called the title, "one of the best open world games to come along in ages" and said it takes place in "an enchanting world filled with adventure, excitement, beauty, physics-driven fun, and lots of charming characters". Game Informer said it "drips with joyful, explorative fun" and has a sandbox world that is "rewarding at just about every turn". GamesRadar+ wrote that Tchia is a "delightful, inventive adventure" and praised the soul-jumping mechanic, which they said is "inventive and enjoyable".

Destructoid criticized the combat for not evolving over the course of the game, "The issue is, as much fun as I have with the combat, it doesn't change". Polygon praised how the game's map did not directly show the player's location, "Tchia's map reinforces the game's focus on exploration; don't run straight from task to task. Take some time to look around". NPR liked the protagonist's ability to possess creatures, feeling it gave the player freedom to experiment, "they make traversing the colorful and vibrant world a true joy".

Edge enjoyed the protagonist's boat, writing that exploring the archipelago on it was a joy, "Some of Tchia's standout moments involve your catamaran, as you scud across shimmering waves toward the sunset or weave your way along twisting rivers". Eurogamer praised the darker nature of Tchia's storyline, "You're dealing with things that really matter, and working through a storyline that is not afraid to lurch from one horror to the next". Rock Paper Shotgun liked the Caledonian influences present in the title, "New Caledonian culture, folklore, and traditions are stamped all over Tchia".

=== Awards and accolades ===
Year	Award	Category	Result	Ref.
2023	Golden Joystick Awards 2023	PC Game of the Year	Nominated	
2023	The Game Awards 2023	Games for Impact	Won	
2024	35th GLAAD Media Awards	Outstanding Video Game	Nominated	
2024	20th British Academy Games Awards	Game Beyond Entertainment	Won	
2024	22nd Annual G.A.N.G. Awards	Best Audio for an Indie Game	Won	
2024	22nd Annual G.A.N.G. Awards	Best Main Theme	Nominated	
2024	22nd Annual G.A.N.G. Awards	Best New Original IP Audio	Nominated	
2024	22nd Annual G.A.N.G. Awards	Best Original Song	Nominated	
2024	22nd Annual G.A.N.G. Awards	Best Original Soundtrack Album	Nominated	
2024	22nd Annual G.A.N.G. Awards	Creative and Technical Achievement in Music	Nominated	
2024	22nd Annual G.A.N.G. Awards	Music of the Year	Nominated	
2025	6th Pégases Awards	Best Accessibility	Nominated	
2025	6th Pégases Awards	Beyond the Video Game	Won	
