= Bionic Bay =

2025 video game

- Developers: Mureena Oy; Psychoflow Studio
- Publisher: Kepler Interactive
- Designer: Juhana Myllys
- Programmers: Xiao-Fong Huang; Kevin Lai
- Artist: Juhana Myllys
- Writer: Juhana Myllys
- Composer: Francisco Javier Pérez
- Engine: Unity
- Platforms: Microsoft Windows; PlayStation 5
- Release: April 17, 2025
- Genre: Platform
- Modes: Single-player, multiplayer

Bionic Bay is a platform video game co-developed by Mureena and Psychoflow Studio, and published by Kepler Interactive. The player assumes control of an unnamed scientist who must escape an ancient biomechanic world filled with dangerous traps and hazards. It was released on April 17, 2025 for Windows PC and PlayStation 5.

== Gameplay ==
Bionic Bay is a physics-based 2D platform game. The player assumes control of a scientist who is transported to a biomechanical world following a laboratory accident. To survive and escape this world, he must overcome various platforming challenges and bypass dangerous environmental hazards. The player character is equipped with several skills, such as the ability to briefly slow down time, hurl objects telekinetically across the environment, flip gravity, and swap place with objects. Bionic Bay also features an online mode in which players can race against each other to reach the top of a global leaderboard.

== Development ==
Juhana Myllys, who previously worked on games such as Badland and Badland 2, was the creative director. The development commenced following a chance meeting between Myllys and Psychoflow Studio, which showcased clips of a teleportation gameplay mechanic on Reddit. While teleportation is the central gameplay mechanic, the scope of the project expanded to include more powers, and players are tasked to combine these abilities in order to solve environmental puzzles. Visually, Bionic Bay was inspired by a number of projects, including games like Portal, N+, Another World, Mirror’s Edge, Oddworld, as well as works by Buster Keaton, The Matrix, and brutalist architecture.

Bionic Bay was announced by publisher Kepler Interactive in December 2024. Initially set to be released on March 13, 2025 for Windows and PlayStation 5, it was delayed to April 17, 2025. The team also partnered with PlayStation for a character skin based on former executive Shuhei Yoshida, who will also have his special online level.

== Reception ==
Reception

Aggregate scores
Aggregator	Score
Metacritic	(PC) 87/100 (PS5) 81/100
OpenCritic	89% recommend

Review score
Publication	Score
Game Informer	8.25/10

Bionic Bay received "generally favorable" reviews upon release, according to the review aggregation website Metacritic. Fellow review aggregator OpenCritic assessed that the game received "mighty" approval, being recommended by 89% of critics.

Andrew Webster, writing for The Verge, compared the gameplay to Super Meat Boy, in which players will encounter "seemingly insurmountable tasks". While he said that Bionic Bay was difficult, it encouraged players to experiment with different gameplay mechanics as the game saves the player's progress frequently. Anthony Franklin II from Vice strongly recommended Bionic Bay and described it as "an atmospheric, occasionally creepy physics-based experience that is beautiful in its darkness and a great test of platforming skill". Matt Miller from Game Informer described it as a "surprising and novel release managing the rare feat of consistent and rewarding gameplay from beginning to end". He liked the general platforming gameplay, and praised Bionic Bay's level design, which he compared favorably to Inside and Portal. Despite describing the art style as "breathtaking", he felt that the environments became progressively oppressive. While Franklin noted that the game had a minimalist storytelling style, Miller was disappointed that the story was almost "non-existent", wasting the potential of its setting.
