= Kepler Interactive =

Video game publisher

Kepler Interactive Limited
- Type: Private
- Industry: Video games
- Founded: 2 April 2020; 6 years ago
- Headquarters: London, United Kingdom
- Key people: Alexis Garavaryan (CEO); Sun Yiu Samuel Lee (COO)
- Divisions: Kepler Ghost
- Website: kepler-interactive.com

Kepler Interactive Limited is a video game publisher headquartered in London, with an additional office in Singapore. Founded in April 2020 at the initiative of Alexis Garavaryan, the company was formed via an alliance with seven indie game developers. They are New Zealand-based A44, Canada-based Alpha Channel, France-based Awaceb and Sloclap, Serbia-based Ebb Software, Japan-based Swedish developer Shapefarm and US-based Timberline Studio.

In September 2021, Garavaryan announced Kepler had received funding from NetEase and that the latter would be a minority investor, with plans for the company's game studio founders to become co-owners, share resources and financial gains, while remaining in charge of their own studios. In 2023 and 2025 respectively, Singapore-based The Gentlebros and France-based Tactical Adventures became the eighth and ninth independent game developers to join the collective of studios that co-own Kepler.

Employing around 50 people, Kepler also publishes titles from studios outside the group. Its most notable published games include Sifu (2022), Tchia (2023), Pacific Drive (2024) and Clair Obscur: Expedition 33 (2025).

== History ==
Kepler Interactive was founded on 2 April 2020 at the initiative of former Ubisoft employee and French entrepreneur Alexis Garavaryan, who had previously co-founded the video game investment fund Kowloon Nights. Self-described as a "super developer" publishing group, Kepler was born out of an alliance between seven studios to “pool their resources and knowledge”. In September 2021, Kepler announced it had raised $120 million from Chinese gaming company NetEase.

In 2023, Kepler launched Kepler Ghost, a white-label publishing service, providing marketing and publishing for game developers. Studio Sai's Eternights was the first video game project to benefit from this program. The Gentlebros, the developer behind the Cat Quest series, became the eighth studio to join Kepler's ownership structure; meanwhile a partnership with the new studio Sandfall Interactive for the latter's debut title, Clair Obscur: Expedition 33, was officially announced in March 2023. It also partnered with Ironwood Studios for the publishing of Pacific Drive.

In April 2025, Kepler published Clair Obscur: Expedition 33, whose development it had funded as a result of its partnership with Sandfall, to universal acclaim. The same year, Tactical Adventures, the studio behind Solasta: Crown of the Magister, became the ninth independent studio to join the collective of studios that co-own Kepler Interactive.

== Organization and company ethos ==
The company has stated that every studio head that enters the fold gets an equal say on how Kepler operates, and an equal share of the benefits. In 2021, beyond Garavaryan himself, this included the heads of A44 (known for developing Ashen), Alpha Channel, Awaceb (known for Tchia), Ebb Software (known for Scorn), Shapefarm, Sloclap (known for developing Absolver and Sifu) and Timberline Studio. It was affirmed they had a studio committee, which meets on a weekly basis, as to major decisions relating to Kepler, but that this did not involve the heads deliberating on decisions pertaining to the individual studios themselves, which remain functionally independent.

Garavaryan asserts Kepler to be highly selective as to the titles it publishes. It evaluates an average of 1,400 projects per year and signs “only two or three”. He also states the firm sets itself apart by financing projects with modest budgets but with high-quality visuals and innovative game mechanics. Unlike most publishers, who finance a title in exchange for varying degrees of control over its development, Garavaryan asserts Kepler never imposes decisions on the development studios it partners with. François Meurisse, COO and co-founder of Sandfall Interactive, highlighted it was this promise of creative freedom on Expedition 33 that ultimately prompted the team, which had received offers from Kepler and several other publishers in the industry at the Game Developers Conference in March 2022, to sign with the former.

== Revenue and milestones ==
Kepler generated a gross revenue of $50 million in FY2022 in the wake of Sloclap's Sifu and Ebb Software's Scorn, the first titles published by the company. It was not a profitable year however, as the company operated at a loss; as was the case in the following two fiscal years. In 2025, with the release of Sloclap's Rematch and most notably Sandfall's commercial smash Clair Obscur: Expedition 33, the young publisher generated a record gross revenue of $305m (a 522% increase from the $49m generated in FY2024) and gross profit of $193m (a 565% increase from $29m in FY2024). With an operating profit of $128m and profit after tax of $108m (up from an operating loss of $16m and a loss after tax of $38m the previous year), FY2025 marked Kepler's first profitable year since its foundation.

== Games published ==
Year	Title	Platform(s)	Developer	Ref.
2022	Sifu	Microsoft Windows, Nintendo Switch, PlayStation 4, PlayStation 5, Xbox One, Xbox Series X/S	Sloclap	
2022	Scorn	Windows, PlayStation 5, Xbox Series X/S	Ebb Software	
2023	Tchia	Windows, Nintendo Switch, PlayStation 4, PlayStation 5, Xbox Series X/S	Awaceb	
2024	Ultros	macOS, Windows, Nintendo Switch, PlayStation 4, PlayStation 5, Xbox Series X/S	Hadoque	
2024	Pacific Drive	Windows, PlayStation 5, Xbox Series X/S	Ironwood Studios	
2024	Cat Quest III	Windows, Nintendo Switch, PlayStation 4, PlayStation 5, Xbox One, Xbox Series X/S	The Gentlebros	
2024	Flintlock: The Siege of Dawn	Windows, PlayStation 4, PlayStation 5, Xbox One, Xbox Series X/S	A44	
2025	Bionic Bay	Windows, PlayStation 5	Mureena, Psychoflow Studio	
2025	Clair Obscur: Expedition 33	Windows, PlayStation 5, Xbox Series X/S	Sandfall Interactive	
2025	Rematch	Windows, PlayStation 5, Xbox Series X/S	Sloclap	
2026	Orbitals	Nintendo Switch 2	Shapefarm	
2027	TankRat	Windows, PlayStation 5	Alpha Channel	
2027	Ontos	Windows, PlayStation 5, Xbox Series X/S	Frictional Games	
2027	PVKK: Planetenverteidigungskanonenkommandant	Windows, macOS	Bippinbits	
TBA	Solasta II	Windows	Tactical Adventures	

=== Games published via Kepler Ghost ===
Year	Title	Platform(s)	Developer	Ref.
2023	Eternights	Windows, PlayStation 4, PlayStation 5	Studio Sai	
2023	En Garde!	Windows	Fireplace Games	
2023	Apocalypse Party	Windows	Breaker Games	
2023	Battle Shapers	Windows	Metric Empire	
2024	Windblown	Windows	Motion Twin	
2024	Unrailed 2: Back on Track	Windows, macOS	Indoor Astronaut	
2024	Dark Hours	Windows	Piece of Cake Studios	
2026	Blightstone	Windows	Unfinished Pixel	
2026	Beastro	Windows, PlayStation 5, Xbox Series X/S	Timberline Studio	
2026	Neon Abyss 2	Windows, Nintendo Switch, PlayStation 5, Xbox Series X/S	Vivo Games	
