= Godfall =

2020 action role-playing video game

- Developer: Counterplay Games (Note: The game is co-developed with Disruptive Games.)
- Publisher: Gearbox Publishing
- Engine: Unreal Engine 4
- Platforms: PlayStation 5; Windows; PlayStation 4; Xbox One; Xbox Series X/S
- Release: PlayStation 5, Windows: NA/AU: November 12, 2020; EU: November 19, 2020; PlayStation 4: WW: August 10, 2021; Xbox One, Xbox Series X/S: WW: April 7, 2022
- Genre: Action role-playing
- Modes: Single-player, multiplayer

Godfall is an action role-playing game developed by Counterplay Games and published by Gearbox Publishing. The game was released for PlayStation 5 and Windows on November 12, 2020. It was also released for the PlayStation 4 on August 10, 2021. An enhanced version of the game containing all downloadable content up to that point, titled Godfall: Ultimate Edition, was released for PlayStation 4, PlayStation 5, Windows, Xbox One, and Xbox Series X/S on April 7, 2022. It received mixed reviews from critics.

== Gameplay ==
The game is set in a high fantasy setting, split into the realms of Earth, Water, Air, where players take the role of one of the last exalted Knight's Order to prevent a major apocalyptic event. The player has five weapon classes to select from, based on which of their armor sets, Valorplates, they equip. These weapon classes include the longsword, dual blades, polearm, two handed war hammer and the two handed great sword. Additional Valorplates and Augments can be equipped to customize how this character class plays out. It supports single player and up to three players in cooperative mode. The game is described as a "looter-slasher" being based on the loot shooter concept of completing missions and gaining better loot for further quests, the focus of the combat is on melee attacks rather than ranged ones.

== Development ==
The game was developed by Counterplay Games, a 75-person studio in California with several developers that had worked on other loot shooters such as Destiny 2, their prior game being Duelyst. Counterplay engaged with Kowloon Nights to gain funding to help develop Godfall by September 2018 as a triple-A title, and avoid some of the struggles they had with funding Duelyst through a Kickstarter campaign.

The game's world was inspired by The Stormlight Archive, The First Law and the Foundation series, while the gameplay from the Monster Hunter series inspired the variety of weapons and combo mechanics.

== Marketing and release ==
Godfall was announced in December 2019 at The Game Awards, where it was the first game confirmed for release on the PlayStation 5. The game was developed with Unreal Engine 4.

At their E3 2021 press conference, Gearbox announced that Godfall would release for the PlayStation 4 on August 10, 2021. It came alongside an expansion called Fire and Darkness.

== Reception ==
Reception

Aggregate scores
Aggregator	Score
Metacritic	(PC) 59/100 (PS5) 61/100 (XBSX) (Ultimate Edition) 74/100
OpenCritic	10% recommend

Review scores
Publication	Score
Destructoid	7/10
Game Informer	7/10
GameSpot	5/10
IGN	6/10
PC Gamer (US)	65/100
USgamer	2.5/5

Godfall received "mixed or average" reviews from critics, according to review aggregator website Metacritic. Fellow review aggregator OpenCritic assessed that the game received weak approval, being recommended by only 10% of critics.

=== Sales ===
Godfall sold 5,342 physical units within its first week of release in Japan, making it the 21st best-selling retail game of the week in the country.
