= Fereshteh Forough =

Afghan computer scientist and entrepreneur (born 1985)

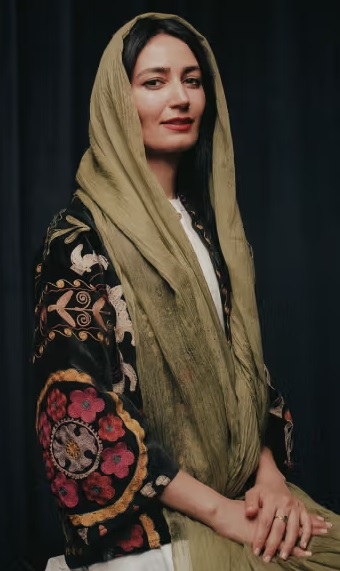
- Education: Herat University; Technische Universität Berlin
- Occupations: Computer scientist; educator; entrepreneur
- Years active: 2012 - present
- Organization: Code to Inspire
- Known for: Founder of Code to Inspire
- Notable work: Establishing the first coding school for girls in Afghanistan
- Website: www.codetoinspire.org

Fereshteh Forough (Dari: فرشته فروغ) (born 1985) is an Afghan computer scientist, educator and entrepreneur, and the CEO and founder of Code to Inspire (CTI), the first coding school for girls in Afghanistan, which opened in November 2015. She is an advocate for gender equality and the empowerment of women in developing countries through digital literacy, education, and financial independence. Through CTI she has worked to broaden access to technology education for Afghan girls and to help graduates take on paid work with clients and employers both inside Afghanistan and abroad.

== Early life and education ==
Fereshteh Forough discussing the support of her family in a video for the International Organization for Migration.

Forough was born in Iran to Afghan parents and grew up a refugee. She is one of eight siblings. A year after the fall of the Taliban in 2001, her family moved back to Herat, Afghanistan. In 2012, she moved to New York City.

Forough graduated from high school in Iran, majoring in literature. She initially had no interest in computer science but was assigned the field after taking a college entrance exam. Her father encouraged her to pursue the field, and she took his advice. She went on to obtain a Bachelor's in Computer Science from Herat University and later a Master's degree from Technische Universität Berlin in Germany.

Forough has linked her decision to open a school for women to her own upbringing. Her family, living in Iran as refugees, had to obtain official paperwork each year before she could be enrolled, and she has recalled growing up with a persistent uncertainty over whether she would be allowed to attend at all. She has also said that she met harassment and discrimination while studying computer science in Herat and later while teaching there.

== Career ==
After obtaining her master's degree, Forough became a professor of computer science at her alma mater, Herat University, where she worked for almost three years. Before founding Code to Inspire in January 2015, Forough was also a co-founder and board member of Women's Annex Foundation. Now known as Digital Citizen Fund, this organization is a non-profit that teaches girls and women digital literacy and works to provide access to technology and the internet to girls in developing countries.

=== Code to Inspire ===
Code to Inspire (CTI) opened the first all-female coding school in Afghanistan in November 2015. CTI, based in Herat, is a non-profit, one-year program. Women and girls in the program are typically between 15 and 25 years of age. Forough saw a need for an exclusively female coding school when she herself was studying and faced discrimination from male peers. She set up a crowdfunding campaign through IndieGoGo and raised over $22,000 USD to help fund the coding school. CTI has also received donations from organizations including GitHub, the Malala Fund, Google's GooglersGive programme and BitFury, as well as 20 laptop computers from Overstock.com. Forough's goal in establishing CTI was to allow girls to learn valuable technological skills in a safe and comfortable environment. Students are also able to build their resumes which can lead to greater job opportunities after graduation. More advanced students learn how to create mobile apps and educational games, while those less experienced learn the basics of coding and other technological skills, such as how to use social media.

Subjects taught at the school have included game design, web design, graphic design and full-stack programming, together with introductory blockchain material such as writing smart contracts in Solidity. CTI has also worked with the Ethereum development studio ConsenSys, which covered the cost of sending a group of students to a conference in Japan. Students and graduates have taken on remote work for technology companies abroad, including mobile app development and graphic design. By 2021 the school had graduated more than 300 students, around half of whom had gone on to find work in the field.

Forough has voiced her desire to open new branches of CTI in other cities in Afghanistan and countries throughout the Middle East and Africa.

In 2021, Forough was forced to close the school's physical location in Herat due to the Taliban's takeover of the country. To ensure classes were able to continue virtually, CTI provided laptops and internet packages to students in need. Eighty percent of students have continued to attend the school online.

During the economic crisis that followed the Taliban's return to power, CTI began delivering emergency support to students and their families in cryptocurrency. From September 2021, roughly 100 students were sent about $200 a month in BUSD, a token pegged to the value of the US dollar, which recipients traded for afghanis at local money changers. The method let the transfers work around the withdrawal caps Afghan banks had imposed on customers as well as international sanctions, and Forough said a token of fixed value was chosen over bitcoin because one unit always equals one dollar. Seventy-seven students completed a scholarship programme run by the organization; Forough said the group included what she believed were the first women in Afghanistan working as blockchain coders.

==== Awards ====
In 2016, CTI was the recipient of University of California, Berkeley CITRIS Athena Awards for Women in Technology Next Generation Engagement Award. The same year, CTI was awarded Google's RISE Award which granted the organization $25,000 USD. In 2017, CTI was recognized with Sustainia's Community Award.

== Advocacy ==
Forough gave a TED Talk in 2013 and was a 2015 Clinton Global Initiative panel speaker. She was also a mentor for Google's 2016 project Change is Made with Code.

== Recognition ==
At Marie Claire's first ever Young Women's Honors in 2016, Forough won The Revolutionary award. She was also recognized at The Game Awards 2019 as a Global Gaming Citizen, someone who uses games to create positive change. She has been featured in the books 200 Women: Who Will Change the Way You See the World (2017), Unlocked: How Empowered Women Empower Women (2021), and We Are Still Here: Afghan Women on Courage, Freedom, and the Fight to be Heard (2022).
