= Flintlock: The Siege of Dawn =

- Developer: A44 Games
- Publisher: Kepler Interactive
- Director: Simon Dasan
- Producers: Alex Wills; Rebecca Sharp; Stefan Devitt; Tommy Viles
- Designer: Jarratt Gray
- Programmer: Hayden Asplet
- Artist: Marie-Charlotte Derne
- Writers: Daniel Baider; Konstantine Paradias
- Composer: E.Hillman
- Engine: Unreal Engine 4
- Platforms: PlayStation 5; Windows; Xbox Series X/S
- Release: July 18, 2024
- Genre: Action role-playing
- Mode: Single-player

Flintlock: The Siege of Dawn is an action role-playing video game developed by A44 Games and published by Kepler Interactive. The game was released for PlayStation 5, Windows, and Xbox Series X/S on July 18, 2024. Upon release, it received mixed reviews from critics.

== Gameplay ==
Flintlock: The Siege of Dawn is an action role-playing video game played from a third-person perspective. In the game, the player assumes control of Nor Vanek, a member of a coalition who must save mankind from extinction by fighting against the old Gods. In Flintlock, the player can use melee weapons and flintlock firearms to attack enemies, though ammunition is scarce in the game. As the player character attacks or parries incoming attacks, they will gradually fill an enemy's armor bar. Once it is completely filled, players can deliver a devastating attack that kills normal enemies instantly, or significantly weakens a boss character. Executing enemies using Nor's axe will refill ammo for her flintlock weapons, while killing enemies with her flintlock firearms will restore armor. The player will be accompanied by Enki, a mysterious fox-like creature. Enki can be commanded to distract or stun enemies, teleport the player, or infuse Nor's attacks with magic. Through Enki's magical abilities, players may acquire the special skills of a boss character after killing them.

The open world of Flintlock is divided into three different regions. Players can partake in different side activities, which may change the state of the game's world and its population. For instance, killing the enemies in a village will prompt its original community to return, thus unlocking new quests and side content. As players complete quests and explore the world, they will meet other non-playable characters. Some of which will join the player's party and show up at the player's caravan. Nor's caravan serves as a hub area in which players can craft or upgrade items. Some weapons are purchased through "reputation", which is gained as players progress in the game and complete quests. Reputation is lost when the player character is killed, though they can be reacquired at the location where the player character previously died. Players can also unlock new abilities by gaining experience points, which will permanently stay with the player character. The recruited NPCs will also unlock new options for combat and transversal. For instance, engineers recruited by Nor may use explosives to help her unlock shortcuts and secret areas.

== Development and release ==
Flintlock: The Siege of Dawn was developed by A44 Games, the studio behind Ashen. The game was developed by a team of about 60 people. In the game, firearms and magic are equally powerful. The team believed that this concept (flintlock fantasy), while commonly seen in books, was relatively less explored in films or video games. Art director Robert Bruce added that it was an "untapped subgenre of fantasy", and compared Flintlock's setting and tone to Shadow and Bone. The game's 19th century aesthetics were inspired by imagery during Napoleonic era, while the setting was influenced by New Zealand's landscape and wildlife. The Gods featured in the game were inspired by Mesopotamian deities. The human characters in the game were created using Unreal Engine's MetaHuman tool, which allowed the team to animate characters quickly, allowing the team to focus on developing and refining other aspects of the game.

The team described Flintlock as "somewhere in the middle" of God of War and Elden Ring. Combat was largely inspired by the Soulslike games, though the storytelling has a more cinematic presentation, similar to typical AAA games. While designing the combat, the team wanted the game to have a sense of rhythm, with game director Derek Bradley describing Flintlock's combat as a "dance". Players are also encouraged to perform tricks and move acrobatically during combat, as they game utilizes a scoring system similar to those found in Tony Hawk's games. The team wanted the game to be accessible. Therefore, A44 introduced "Possessed Mode", thus allowing players to manually adjust the game's difficulty. The relationship between Nor and Enki was inspired by that of Kratos and Atreus in God of War (2018). Enki was described by Bradley as a "little fox thing with monkey paws and bird feet". Enki was described to be a "greedy" but "charismatic" creature who initially only saw Nor as its puppet. While the two characters have different motivations, the two will eventually develop a "strong bond", and their relationship will gradually develop over the course of the game.

Flintlock was officially announced on March 14, 2022 with a cinematic trailer. It was published by Kepler Interactive, a publishing label jointly operated by several independent game developers including A44. After several delays, the game was released for PlayStation 5, Windows, and Xbox Series X/S on July 18, 2024.

== Reception ==
Flintlock: The Siege of Dawn received "mixed or average" reviews from critics, according to review aggregator website Metacritic. Fellow review aggregator OpenCritic assessed that the game received fair approval, being recommended by 34% of critics.
