= Garden Story =

2021 video game

- Developer: Picogram
- Publisher: Rose City Games
- Programmer: Picogram
- Artist: Picogram
- Composer: Grahm Nesbitt
- Platforms: Microsoft Windows; macOS; Nintendo Switch; Xbox One
- Release: macOS, Windows, Switch; August 11, 2021; Xbox One; July 12, 2022
- Genre: Action role-playing
- Mode: Single-player

Garden Story is an action role-playing game developed by Picogram and published by Rose City Games. The game was released for macOS, Windows, and Nintendo Switch on August 11, 2021, and for Xbox One on July 12, 2022. Limited Run Games announced that physical copies would be distributed in Q3 2022.

The game follows Concord, a grape who takes care of the kindergarten, which is tended by the youngest Greenling. Plum, the Guardian of Spring Hamlet, tells them that the Rot is causing the lack of new Greenlings. Plum appoints Concord as the new Guardian of Spring Hamlet, and Concord goes on a journey across the Grove to defeat the Rot. Garden Story received mixed reviews from critics, who praised the visuals and music, but were underwhelmed by the gameplay.

== Gameplay ==
Concord fighting Octopihi, a boss

In Garden Story, players control a grape named Concord, who has to travel across the Grove and eliminate the Rot that resides there. Concord can wield a sword, a hammer, and a dowsing rod. Each weapon can be upgraded with materials. An enemy may require the use of a certain weapon to defeat them. Weapons can be used to solve puzzles and gather resources. Concord can use the dowsing rod to grab items or activate switches. Attacking, rolling and sprinting depletes Concord's stamina gauge.

In each town that they visit, Concord is given a house where they can change their clothes, store materials, and refill bottles. Garden Story has a day-night cycle. The day ends if Concord dies or goes to sleep. When Concord wakes up, they are given daily tasks to complete. Each day, the requests on the bulletin board are changed. When Concord rests, the town earns experience points from requests completed during the previous day. The experience points are given to one of three categories. Increasing the level of each category upgrades the inventory of the town's shops. Some towns have to reach a certain level to progress in the story. They are leveled up when Concord completes the town's requests. Concord can collect new resources by planting seeds. Some seeds have to be planted to progress through the story. Concord can build structures around town, and purchase cosmetic items from the stores. To gain access to an area's dungeon, Concord has to complete requests and gather resources. Concord has to defeat the dungeon's boss to move on to the next area.

Orbs can be found around the island. Concord can break them and consume the gems inside of them. These gems provide permanent upgrades to Concord's stats, including stamina, health, resistance, and mind. Perks can be used to change Concord's stats and abilities, which are obtained when they complete tasks. These perks represent memories which alter stats and grant abilities. Concord can restore their health with bottles filled with dew.

== Development and release ==
Garden Story was developed by Filipino-American creator Picogram. The soundtrack was composed by Grahm Nesbitt, who also composed the soundtracks of Goodbye Doggy and Floppy Knights. Garden Story's development started in March 2018. After seeing the game in Portland-based events, Rose City Games partnered with Picogram.

In August 2019, Viz Media announced Garden Story for PC, with a scheduled release in spring 2020. The game was featured at PAX West 2019 Featured at PAX South 2020. A demo showing off a region called Autumn Town was released on Steam in November. It was available until December 21. Garden Story was a part of the Indie Megabooth at PAX East 2020. The developers showcased the game at the Fellow Traveller event, LudoNarracon. To prepare for the event, Picogram recorded themselves making art. Grahm had discussions about composition, and played live versions of the soundtrack's songs.

In June, Garden Story was delayed to 2021. In July, the game was featured at Twitch's Indie Showcase. The developers received funding from Kowloon Nights, a funding source founded in 2017. Garden Story's demo was playable during the Steam Game Festival: Spring Edition. At the Day of the Devs event, a trailer was released, showing gameplay footage. Garden Story was given a release window of summer. The game was featured in Wholesome Games' Wholesome Direct. In August, Garden Story was showcased at Nintendo's Indie World event. A Switch release was announced on that same day.

On August 11, 2021, Garden Story was released for Windows, macOS, and Nintendo Switch. The game was also featured at Nintendo's Indie World Showcase. Garden Story received a free expansion, which added shops to the Perennial Plaza, and cosmetic items for Concord. The expansion was released on Steam on October 28. At Limited Run Games' LRG3 presentation, a physical release for Garden Story was announced. The copies are slated for pre-order in Summer 2022.

== Reception ==
Reception

Aggregate score
Aggregator	Score
Metacritic	(PC) 70/100 (Note: Score based on 6 reviews) (NS) 73/100 (Note: Score based on 17 reviews)

Review scores
Publication	Score
Nintendo Life	7/10
Nintendo World Report	6/10
RPGFan	80%
TouchArcade	3/5

Garden Story received "mixed or average" reviews, according to review aggregator Metacritic.

TouchArcade's Shaun Musgrave called the world "positively adorable", and described the game as a "Zelda style" action-adventure. Musgrave wrote that the presentation and characters helped "pull it along". He criticized the technical issues of the Switch version, including the length of the load times. Musgrave believed that Garden Story would appeal to fans of Blossom Tales or Ittle Dew. Kate Gray from Nintendo Life praised the game's music and the variety of systems, but felt that the game quickly lost momentum.

Izzy Parsons from RPGFan lauded the game's graphics and enjoyed the soundtrack. However, Parsons felt that the game design was repetitive and that there was no sense of cohesion or progression in the dungeons. Parsons believed that the characters and world had a magnetism, and wrote that Garden Story was "definitely worth checking out". Nintendo World Report's Jordan Rudek felt that the game made a good first impression, but did not build on its momentum. He praised the art style and music, comparing the visuals to Turnip Boy Commits Tax Evasion. Rudek believed that the story and combat were insufficiently compelling, and deemed the gameplay loop uninspired.
