= Nine to Five (video game) =

2022 video game

- Developer: Redhill Games
- Publisher: Redhill Games
- Engine: Unreal Engine 4
- Platforms: Microsoft Windows, Google Stadia, GeForce Now
- Release: May 16, 2022
- Genre: Massively multiplayer online tactical first-person shooter
- Mode: Multiplayer

Nine to Five was a free-to-play "3v3v3" multiplayer tactical first-person shooter video game developed and published by Redhill Games for Windows, Google Stadia and GeForce Now. It featured three teams, each one with three players, competing to complete objectives. The game's development started in 2019, and a closed Alpha was released on June 4, 2020. The Beta Weekend was released on Steam on February 11, 2021 and lasted until February 15, 2021. Later, it was released on Steam Early Access program on August 26, 2021. The game left early access after about 10 months and received its full release with the 1.0 version on May 16, 2022 for PC and Google Stadia. On Stadia, the game entered early access on December 8, 2021. Ending of the development was announced on October 19 2022, and the servers for the game shut down in January 18 2023.

== Setting ==
Nine to Five was set in a near futuristic setting, where the world is no longer ruled by governments, but instead military corporations who hire mercenaries to shutter their rivals and reach global domination. The player was able to choose one of the four factions available: Farmira, Mash Media, New World Finance and Milodyne.

Players were able to use barricades and drones to defend themselves from the enemies and clear areas much more easily.

The game featured only three maps: Old New York, Varmstaad, and Huxwell Clinic. The latter was added on the day of release.

Unlike many other shooters, there were no respawns mid-match, with there being a focus on more team and strategy based gameplay, in a very similar way to Counter Strike. It also featured various customization options, such as camo, optics and mods, offered through paid bundles and loot boxes.

== Development ==
Nine to Five was developed by Redhill Games, a Finnish independent video game developer founded in 2018 by Matias Myllyrinne, who was previously the former CEO of Remedy Entertainment from 2008 to 2015. The game was announced at The Game Awards 2019.

== Reception ==
PC MAG's review of Steam Early Access build praised its team based gameplay, its "satisfying shooting mechanics", customization system and its free-to-play availability, but criticized its lack of content on the build, as well its inconsistent performance in testing, with technical issues such as unexpected freezing, stuttering, and drops in the frame rate

== Server closure ==
On October 19, 2022, just five months after the release of the game, Redhill announced through the game's website, Steam page and its social media, the end of development of Nine to Five, meaning no new updates with content or patches will be released, and the game servers will be still active until January 18, 2023, when they will be shut down. The game was pulled from sale the next day, making it no longer purchasable on Steam and Stadia. Also, all the bundles with weapons and customization options will be made free for players who actually own the game.
