= League of Geeks =

Australian video game company

- Company type: Private
- Industry: Video games
- Founded: January 2011; 14 years ago
- Founder: Ty Carey; Blake Mizzi; Trent Kusters; Jacek Tuschewski
- Headquarters: Melbourne, Australia
- Products: Armello
- Number of employees: 30 (2023)
- Website: leagueofgeeks.com

League of Geeks is a video game development company founded in 2011. Based in Melbourne, Australia, the studio was most known for developing Armello, a digital board game in 2015. The studio's games include Jumplight Odyssey and Solium Infernum.

== History ==
League of Geeks was founded by Ty Carey, Blake Mizzi, Trent Kusters and Jacek Tuschewski in January 2011. All four of them previously worked at Torus Games on various licensed titles. Based in Melbourne, Australia, the studio received fundings from governmental funding agencies Screen Australia and Film Victoria for their first project, Armello. Developed by about 15 people, Armello was described by the team as a "natively-digital card and board game set in a fairy-tale animal kingdom". Initially set to be released only for iPad, League of Geeks launched a successful Kickstarter campaign for the game for its release on additional platforms. Armello was released in 2015 to generally positive reviews, though its commercial performance was a disappointment for the studio, selling only a quarter of what League of Geeks had expected. According to the studio, it was not successful enough for them to greenlight new titles, so they decided to continue to work on updates for Armello instead. Following years of updates, the game was able to generate more revenue than when it was first launched.

In 2020, Private Division announced that it had signed a contract with League of Geeks for the development of a new game. The game, then codenamed Blackcat, was cancelled during the COVID-19 pandemic. Following Blackcat's cancellation, the studio then concurrently worked on two titles: a remake of Solium Infernum, and simulation game Jumplight Odyssey. Development of both games started in mid 2021, and both projects were partly funded by Kowloon Nights. Each game had a team size of about 25 people. League of Geeks adopted the "triple-I" development model, with the team aiming to create games with high production values with a lower budget and staff count when compared with traditional triple-A model. Jumplight Odyssey was released via early access in August 2023. By November 2023, the development team had about 70 people. The studio was in talks with investors to keep the studio afloat, though negotiations fell apart. In December 2023, it was announced that 31 people had been laid off, roughly accounting for 50% of its staff. The entire Jumplight Odyssey development team was laid off, and its development was paused indefinitely. The development teams for Solium Infernum and Armello were not affected. The Solium Infernum remake released for Windows in February 2024.

In June 2024, the studio announced it would be entering "hibernation" indefinitely.

== Games ==
Year	Title	Platform(s)
2015	Armello	Linux, macOS, Windows, PlayStation 4, Xbox One, Nintendo Switch, iOS, Android
2023	Jumplight Odyssey	Windows (early access)
2024	Solium Infernum	Windows
