= Legend of Keepers: Career of a Dungeon Manager =

2021 video game

- Developer(s): Goblinz Studio
- Publisher(s): Goblinz Studio
- Engine: Unity
- Platform(s): Windows, Linux, MacOS, Nintendo Switch
- Release: April 29, 2021
- Genre(s): Dungeon management
- Mode(s): Single-player

Legend of Keepers: Career of a Dungeon Manager is a 2021 dungeon management game developed and published by Goblinz Studio for Windows, Linux, MacOS, and Nintendo Switch.

== Gameplay ==
Players are an employee of a company that runs dungeons. To defend against raiding adventurers, they are put in charge of recruiting monsters and placing traps. Players control the monsters in turn-based tactical combat. If adventurers survive to the end of the dungeon, the player faces them as a final boss. Between attacks by adventurers, players manage their dungeon and optionally trigger random events. If the player is defeated in the boss fight, they must start over. Players retain unlocks when they are defeated, and their level-ups can carry over to another session.

== Development ==
The game was in early access for about a year. The developers credited this with giving them early feedback on how to improve the game, such as prioritizing a free play mode over additional bosses. Legend of Keepers was released for Windows, MacOS, Linux, and Switch on April 29, 2021.

== Reception ==
Reception

Aggregate score
Aggregator	Score	
Aggregator	NS	PC
Metacritic	70/100	76/100

Review scores
Publication	Score	
Publication	NS	PC
4Players	79/100	83/100
GameStar		69/100
Jeuxvideo.com		14/20
PC Games (DE)		8/10

On Metacritic, Legend of Keepers received positive reviews on Windows and mixed reviews on the Switch. Christopher Livingston of PC Gamer said the game was not as polished as Darkest Dungeon, which it resembled in reverse, but he had fun playing it. Nicolas Dixmier of Jeuxvideo.com called it a funny game that does not revolutionize the roguelite genre.
