= Jumplight Odyssey =

2023 video game

- Developer: League of Geeks
- Publisher: League of Geeks
- Platform: Windows
- Release: 21 August 2023 (early access)
- Genre: Simulation
- Mode: Single-player

Jumplight Odyssey is a roguelike management simulation game released by Australian independent developer League of Geeks for early access in 2023. Upon release of the game's demo, Jumplight Odyssey received an average response from critics, with praise directed to the potential of the game's simulation mechanics, whilst faulting the interference of bugs. In December 2023, League of Geeks announced development of the game was on indefinite hiatus, citing high costs, poor sales and business issues.

== Development ==
Jumplight Odyssey was developed by League of Geeks, a Melbourne studio, directed and co-founded by Trent Kusters. Development started in 2020 following the end of a partnership with Private Division on an abandoned project for a game titled BLACKCAT, with Jumplight Odyssey becoming a "scaled down" concept that leveraged some of the aesthetics and gameplay mechanics of the abandoned title. A demo of the game was released in June 2023 as part of the Steam Next Fest, and an early access version of the game was released on 22 August 2023. The game received mixed player reviews on Steam upon release, with the developers acknowledging the game's release "probably should have (been) held off", prompting the studio to focus on an "aggressive patch schedule" and greater communication with the community to improve the response to the game.

On 17 November 2023, League of Geeks "indefinitely paused" production of Jumplight Odyssey following redundancies of staff and contractors working on the game. This action followed months after Kusters had discussed a "critical" period of growth for the studio and managing finances in the context of the contraction of the international games industry, although the studio had assumed the Australian sector was insulated from these trends. League of Geeks publicly announced the layoffs on 6 December 2023, stating the studio's decision was driven by "rapidly rising operation costs, a weakening (Australian dollar), poor Early Access sales, and the unprecedented withdrawal of funding opportunities across the industry". Following announcement, development on Jumplight Odyssey was wound down, with the release of a final patch to implement features that were "remotely ready to go".

== Reception ==
Jumplight Odyssey received an average reception upon the release of its demo, with many critics noting the potential of the game's mechanics, but critiquing the interference of bugs. Edwin Evans-Thirlwell of Eurogamer expressed interest in the potential game's social management system, describing the game as a "more involved" and urgent iteration of Star Trek. Katharine Castle of Rock Paper Shotgun found the game intriguing and noted the demo gave "plenty of opportunity to explore and try out the rest of its plentiful systems", whilst finding the economy "limited" and the crew management mechanics lacking. Writing for Destructoid, Zoey Handley was "excited" by the ambition and depth of the early access version, whilst stating her playthroughs of the game were "stopped by things just not working right" and there were "too many headaches" to access the game in the current state. Charlie Kelly of Checkpoint Gaming noted that whilst the game featured a "charming" presentation and visual design, the game was "chaotic and hard to manage" due to its bugs, balancing issues with supplies, and a "lacking" tutorial.
