= Armello =

2015 video game

- Cover art
- Developer: League of Geeks
- Publisher: League of Geeks
- Composers: Lisa Gerrard; Michael Allen
- Engine: Unity
- Platforms: Microsoft Windows, macOS, Linux, PlayStation 4, Xbox One, iOS, Nintendo Switch, Android
- Release: Microsoft Windows, macOS, Linux, PlayStation 4; September 1, 2015; Xbox One; August 30, 2016; iOS; March 16, 2018; Nintendo Switch, Android; September 27, 2018
- Genres: Role-playing, Digital tabletop
- Modes: Single-player, multiplayer

Armello is a 2015 digital role-playing strategy board game developed by League of Geeks. Announced as an iPad title in September 2012, the game has been in development since mid-2011, with music by composers Lisa Gerrard and Michael Allen. Between April and May 2014, a successful Kickstarter campaign was started to help fund a port to Microsoft Windows as well as stretch goals to bring the game to Android and Windows tablets. The game was chosen to receive additional support from governmental funding agencies Screen Australia and Film Victoria.

Set in a fantasy world with anthropomorphic animals, up to four players assume the role of a hero chosen among their clan to take part in a campaign to become the next king or queen. The game features turn-based board-game mechanics that revolve around the use of dice and cards that are drawn from a deck, with each player's actions influencing the outcome.

== Gameplay ==
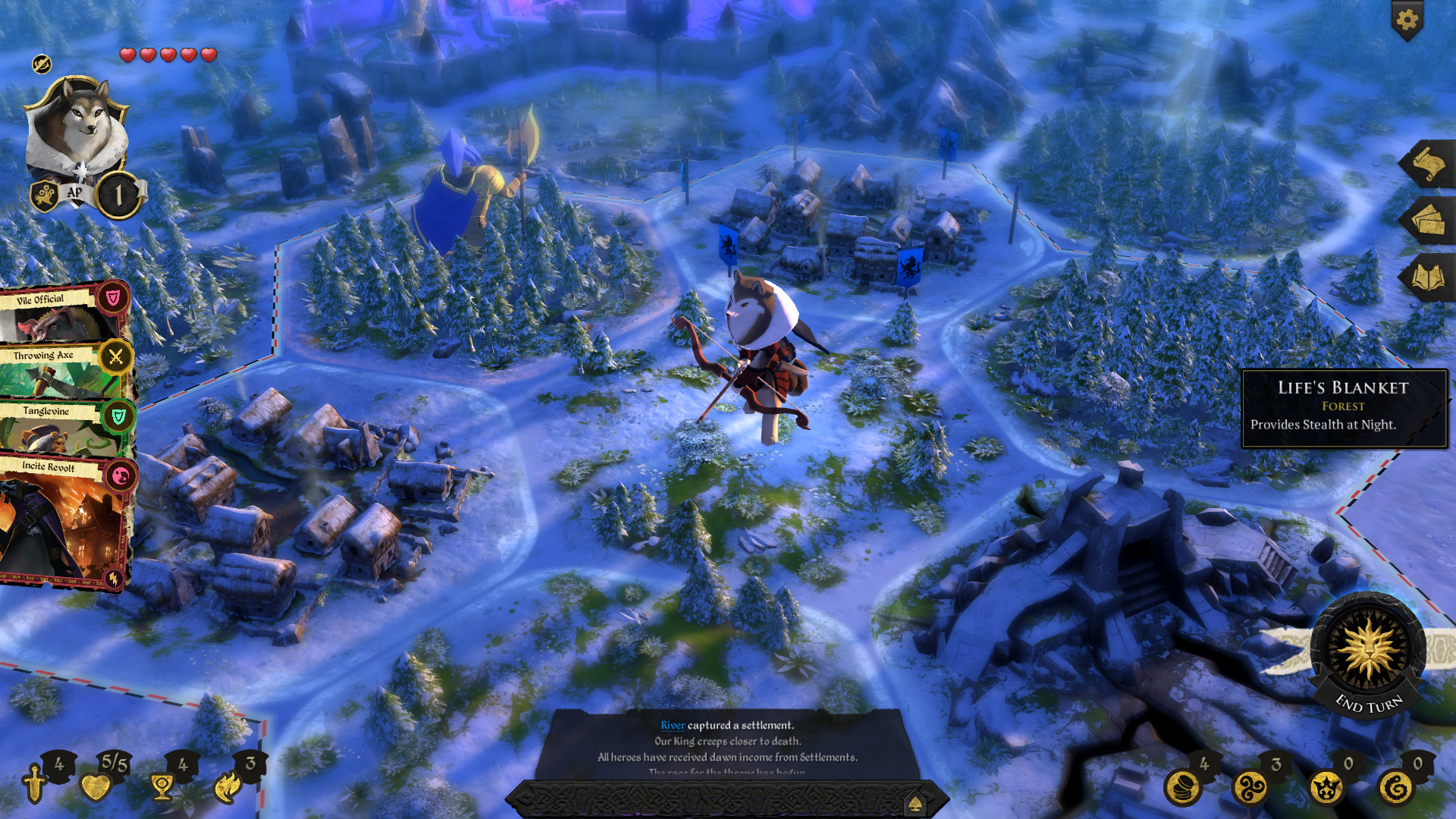
Armello recreates a traditional tabletop role-playing game, based on a fantasy world populated by anthropomorphic creatures.

Armello is a digital simulation of a traditional fantasy tabletop role-playing game utilizing virtual dice and cards which allow the player to carry out specific actions. Up to four players assume the role of a Hero character that represents a specific animal clan, each with their own unique strengths, with the ultimate goal to storm the castle and become the new king or queen of the kingdom. The playing board area is divided into hexagon-shaped tiles that contain randomly generated features such as dungeons to explore, quests to complete, rival heroes to battle, or settlements to capture. As the game progresses, players can acquire currency to purchase additional abilities for their hero using a talent tree system specific to each character.

The game uses a turn-based system where players are allowed to perform actions such as equip items and purchase talents during another player's turn to reduce downtime. Cards and dice are used to directly interact with the game world, and form the basis for the game's combat system. Players use cards they draw from a deck to cast spells, recruit followers, heal wounds, or use items that grant special abilities. Cards may also be played as "Perils" which can be laid on specific tiles to act as traps for other heroes or used immediately in combat, and other cards may be used to forge temporary alliances. Armello also features a day/night cycle where certain heroes gain advantages based on the time of day, and certain groups of enemies only appear in either the darkness or light.

There are four alternative paths to victory and every hero is best suited for reaching a particular one, but every victory condition can be reached with every hero.

== Plot and characters ==
The game takes place in the "dark fairy tale" Kingdom of Armello, a world filled with anthropomorphic animals separated into numerous clans. When the current king becomes corrupted by a dark force called the Rot, representatives from these factions rise up to embark on a journey to become the new king or queen in his stead. Although players can, in theory, immediately attack the King, they generally have better chances if they first undertake some quests, which involve travelling around the board and are each associated with a short narrative.

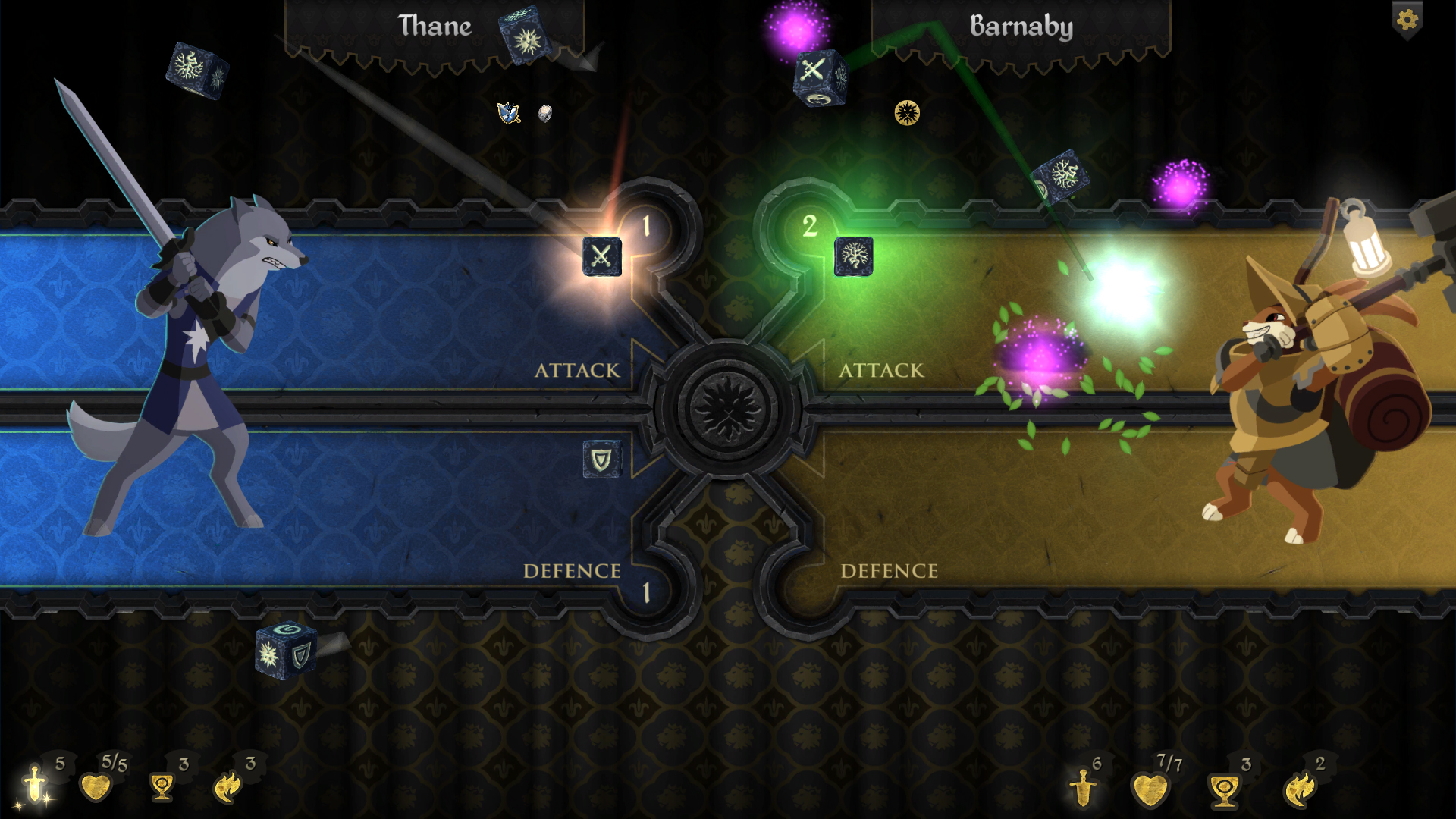
A typical combat result screen, here featuring the characters of Thane the wolf and Barnaby the rabbit.

The base game includes 8 playable heroes, divided into 4 clans; Thane and River (wolf), Amber and Barnaby (rabbit), Mercurio and Zosha (rat), and Sana and Brun (bear). Additional heroes, including two more clans, were added in paid DLC expansions. A fully expanded game has 24 playable characters.

== Development ==
Armello was announced in September 2012 as the debut title from Australian independent game studio League of Geeks, originally as an iPad-exclusive title to be released the following year before experiencing delays. The 15-person development includes four directors: Ty Carey, Trent Kusters, Blake Mizzi, and Jacek Tuschewski, whose total experience in the game industry includes 40 years and 50 released projects. Kusters stated that he was inspired to create the game after hearing about the success Greg Kasavin had in producing Bastion with such a small team. League of Geeks began work on the game after eight months of prototypes on paper, with an additional 18 months of work to arrive at the pre-alpha build. An early version of the game was showcased at the Game Developers Conference in April 2013, and later at the inaugural PAX Australia the following July.

In December 2011 and October 2013, League of Geeks received assistance funding from the state government of Victoria. At the 2012 Sydney Film Festival, it was announced that Armello was one of 14 projects chosen from a pool of 89 to receive additional support from the Australian federal government funding body Screen Australia.

When describing the title's genre and influences, Kusters pitched it as "imagine Magic: The Gathering meets Final Fantasy Tactics," and "Game of Thrones meets Kung Fu Panda", also mentioning that it features components of board games, trading card games, and strategy role-playing games. The game was also said to appeal to fans of Redwall and The Dark Crystal, as well as the animated works of Studio Ghibli, particularly Spirited Away, which was cited as a large influence on Armello's art direction and story.

The team launched a 30-day Kickstarter project page beginning in April 2014 to garner an additional AUD$200,000 to help produce the game full-time, as well as lend support to a release on Windows, OS X, and Linux platforms using the Steam service. A stretch goal was also added, extending possible support to Android and Windows tablets. A tentative release date of March 2015 was also set. On 8 May 2014, the campaign reached $305,360, successfully funding the game, as well as hitting all extended stretch goals, which included releases for the two additional platforms, more languages, in-game cards, and a winter-based map tileset.

== Release ==
Armello launched on Steam Early Access on 22 January 2015. On 26 May 2015, a PlayStation 4 version was announced. The full version of the game was released for Microsoft Windows, OS X, Linux and PlayStation 4 on 1 September 2015. An Xbox One version, and a paid expansion which adds four new heroes, were later announced in April 2016, with the Xbox version and the Usurpers expansion both released later that year on 30 August 2016.

In December 2015, League of Geeks partnered with IndieBox, a monthly subscription box service, to produce a custom-designed, physical version of Armello. This limited, individually-numbered edition included a flash-drive with a DRM-free copy of the game, the official soundtrack, an instruction manual, Steam key, and several custom-made collectible items.

=== Downloadable content ===
The first package of downloadable content titled "Armello: Usurpers", adding four new heroes to the game, was released on 30 August 2016 about a year after the game's release. The content was limited to the console versions of the title and through Steam for personal computers. Though they had planned on offering the content to all users since the Kickstarter, including those with DRM-free versions of the game as through GOG.com, League of Geeks found that being able to support the content on the DRM-free platform was a task beyond their resources. Co-founder Trent Kusters stated "given infinite resources and time we could undertake the task of rewriting the underlying architecture at the core of this decision, but that's straight up not feasible for a vast number of reasons that are unique to [League of Geeks], Armello, where we're standing right now and where we see Armello's future." League of Geeks allowed those consumers that had purchased the DRM-free version to request refunds of the game because of this decision.

== Reception ==
Reception

Aggregate score
Aggregator	Score
Metacritic	PC: 75/100; PS4: 74/100; XONE: 80/100; NS: 80/100 iOS: 71/100

Review score
Publication	Score
TouchArcade	iOS: 4/5

According to Metacritic, Armello has received "generally favourable" reviews on Windows, Xbox One and Nintendo Switch and "mixed or average" reviews on PlayStation 4 and iOS. GameSpot awarded the game 8 out of 10, commenting that while it could use some "fine tuning", it remains "one of the best virtual board game experiences available." PlayStation LifeStyle also awarded the game 8 out of 10, saying "It's a well-balanced and good-looking experience that shows originality is still possible in a format that's centuries old." IGN was less positive, presenting it with a score of 5.6 out of 10, saying "Armello makes a great first impression, but it has a bad habit of making you feel like you're playing alone."

The game was nominated for the Excellence in Visual Art for the 2016 Independent Games Festival.
