= Block'hood =

2017 video game

- Developer: Plethora Project
- Publisher: Devolver Digital
- Composer: Selma Mutal
- Engine: Unity
- Platforms: Windows, MacOS, Linux
- Release: WW: May 11, 2017
- Genre: City-building
- Mode: Single-player

Block'hood is a 2017 city-building video game developed by Plethora Project and published by Devolver Digital. It was released on May 11, 2017 for Microsoft Windows, MacOS and Linux. Plethora Project developed a spiritual successor Common'hood, released in 2022.

== Gameplay ==
Block'hood is a neighbourhood building simulator. It involves building a vertical tower for people to live in by combining square building blocks. There are over 200 different building blocks each serving different purposes and requiring different resources. Every block has inputs which are resources it consumes and outputs which are resources it produces. Resources such as Energy and Food must be managed, and if a building block doesn't have all its required resources it will decay and need to be replaced. To produce more resources blocks such as Wind Turbines, Farms and Water towers can be built. Other blocks that are available include: Flats which can house inhabitants, Parks that provide fresh air, Shops that produce money and Clinics that reduce sickness.

The game is intended to be partially educational so it incorporates real world mechanics. When building all blocks must be accessible which can be achieved by adding stairs and corridors. The buildings must also be architecturally sound, for example corridors must be supported before they can built upon.

There is a story mode with 5 chapters that also serves as the initial tutorial to the game. Additional tutorials are included that cover more complex mechanics of the game. There is a challenge mode where there are 24 challenges to complete, which involve producing a specified number of resources given a limited amount of money or other resources. The sandbox mode allows a neighbourhood to be built in an area of customisable size, inhabitants demands and random events can be left on or turned off in this mode.

== Development ==
Block'hood, developed by American developer Plethora Project, was first released for early access on March 10, 2016 for Microsoft Windows and MacOS. On March 30, 2016, new features were released including a new UI to inspect block properties, Pigs and Cows were added as well as new farms. On April 27, 2016, Inhabitants were added to the game along with new building blocks. On May 25, 2016, more inhabitants were added, as well as new challenge levels and more new building blocks. Plethora Project went to E3 in June 2016 to represent the game on MacOS. The game won an award for Best Gameplay at the "Games for Change" festival in June 2016. More new features including a world system enabling a larger neighborhoods were released on July 11, 2016. On August 11, 2016, an update improving the menu system and user interface was released. On October 14, 2016, all 200 building blocks were available and dynamic effects like wind and rain were published. On December 5, 2016, inhabitants demands were added. The first Linux version of the game was released on December 18, 2016. The full version of the game was released on May 11, 2017, which included a new story game mode. The game is built on the Unity game engine.

== Reception ==
Destructoid gave the game, 7 out of 10 Digitally Downloaded gave the game, 5 out of 5. Hey Poor Critic gave the game, 3 out of 5.

Based on 6 reviews, the score from Metacritic is 75 out of 100.
