= Eternights =

2023 video game

- Steam cover
- Developer: Studio Sai
- Publishers: Studio Sai; Crunchyroll Games (Mobile)
- Engine: Unity
- Platforms: PlayStation 4; PlayStation 5; Windows; Nintendo Switch; Android; iOS
- Release: PS4, PS5, Windows; 12 September 2023; Nintendo Switch; 17 October 2024; Android, iOS; 20 November, 2024
- Genres: Action role-playing, dating sim
- Mode: Single-player

Eternights is a 2023 dating sim action role-playing game developed and published by Studio Sai. The game was released digitally for PlayStation 4, PlayStation 5, and Windows on 12 September 2023. It was then released physically for PlayStation 4 and PlayStation 5 on 16 November 2023. It was later released for Nintendo Switch on 17 October 2024. It was finally released for Android and iOS on 20 November 2024 for Crunchyroll subscribers as part of the Crunchyroll Game Vault program.

Eternights received mixed reviews from critics and sold 150,000 units by April 2024.

== Gameplay ==
Combat in Eternights is that of a hack and slash game. Dodging an enemy attack with precision slows down time, giving the player a better opportunity to attack. Hitting an enemy enough times within a short period creates a combo, allowing the player to perform a stronger attack or a finisher. Attacking enemies or performing Perfect Dodges charges the Elemental Gauge, and parts of the Gauge can be used for an Elemental Fist attack that breaks enemy barriers if the player succeeds in a quick-time event. SP can be spent during battle to use special abilities which are granted through other characters.

Choosing certain dialogue options while talking to other characters can increase the protagonist's Social Stats, as well as his relationship level with other characters. Increasing the relationship level with another character grants the protagonist new abilities in combat.

The game includes a calendar system, where doing certain tasks causes time to pass, changing what activities are available.

== Premise ==
An anti-aging drug called Eternights mutates people into monsters, and supernatural events begin to occur. An 18-year-old boy (who is named by the player) is attacked by an unknown woman named Delia who cuts his arm off using her scythe, and another woman he met on a dating app replaces his lost arm with a magical, glowing one that can also transform into a sword, allowing him to fight the monsters. Along the way are his best friend as well as the pop star idol he loves.

== Reception ==
=== Pre-release ===
Before release, Eternights drew comparisons to the Persona video game series due to its premise of teenagers fighting supernatural enemies while including social and calendar elements in the gameplay. Writing for Kotaku, Kenneth Shepard praised the game for including a gay romance option, but considered the character writing in the game's demo to be superficial and the combat to be "flimsy as hell", noting a "lack of weight" to attacks and movement in the game's action sequences. Reviewing a preview version from the Summer Game Fest Play Days, Push Square's Liam Croft was impressed by the game's cutscene visuals, and called the dialogue options "engaging", though "occasionally creepy".

=== Post-release ===
Reception

Aggregate score
| Aggregator | Score |
|---|---|
| Metacritic | (PS5) 68/100 (PC) 75/100 |

Review scores
| Publication | Score |
|---|---|
| Destructoid | 5.5/10 |
| Famitsu | 28/40 |
| IGN | 9/10 |
| Push Square | 7/10 |
| RPGFan | 8.6/10 |

Eternights received "mixed or average" reviews from critics for the PS5 version, while the PC version received "generally favorable" reviews, according to review aggregator website Metacritic. In Japan, four critics from Famitsu gave the game a total score of 28 out of 40, with each critic awarding the game a 7 out of 10.

=== Sales ===
By April 2024, Eternights had sold 150,000 units worldwide.
