= Pégases =

Annual French video game awards ceremony

- Awarded for: Excellence in the video game industry
- Country: France
- Presented by: Academy of Video Game Arts and Techniques
- First award: 2020
- Website: academiejeuvideo.org/en/home

The Pégases, also known as the Céremonie des Pégases (English: Pégases Award Ceremony), is the annual awards ceremony organized by the French Academy of Video Game Arts and Techniques to honor achievements in the French and international video game industry. The ceremony is held in the first or second week of March in Paris and awards titles released in the previous year as well as key figures of the industry.

The recipients of these distinctions every year are decided by the 3,000 members of the Academy, the vast majority of whom are industry professionals. The first edition in 2020 was held at the Théâtre de la Madeleine, while the 2021 edition took place virtually due to the COVID-19 pandemic. Since 2022, the ceremony is held at La Cigale.

The most recent edition, Pégases 2026, was held on 5 March 2026. Guard Crush Games and Supamonks' Absolum topped the list of nominations, having been nominated in five categories, winning two of these accolades. Sandfall Interactive's Clair Obscur: Expedition 33, nominated in four categories, won all four accolades, including the paramount award of "Best Video Game".

== Background ==
In June 2019, the Académie des Arts et Techniques du Jeu Vidéo (Academy of Video Game Arts and Techniques) was founded by the Syndicat National du Jeu Vidéo, the professional trade association that brings together French video game production and publishing companies, all organizations involved in production activities in France, as well as partners in video game development. This new entity's purpose would be to establish a national video game awards ceremony to reward and highlight creative works and talent in the French video game industry. These accolades were intended to mirror the César Awards presented by the Académie des Arts et Techniques du Cinéma, which honor excellence in the French film industry.

The main goal of the Pégases was to elevate the status of video games and to streamline the long-standing French tradition of various—and often competing—awards. By the time of its third edition in 2022, the ceremony had established itself as the sole major event of its kind in France. The Academy also sought to move away from the "César Awards of video games" identity in order to make the Pégases an event in its own right and highlight the contributions of video games to other fields.

The members of the Academy of Video Game Arts and Techniques are grouped into five colleges according to their profession in the video game industry; with a sixth honorary one made up of professionals who play an indirect role in video game production or who work in a field related to the medium. The colleges are:

- "Technology College" : programming, technical direction, networking, IT, tools, etc.
- "Visual and Audio College" : 2D/3D art and concept design, graphics, animation, video creation and cutscene production, sound design, etc.
- "Design College" : game design, level design, scriptwriting and dialogue writing, etc.
- "Management College" : production management, game direction, project management, etc.
- "Publishing and Support College" : marketing, user acquisition, live operations, brand management, business development, etc.
- "Honorary College" : journalists, educators, influencers/content creators, etc.

A Steering Committee consisting of one or two elected members from each college handles administration of the Academy and the preparation of the ceremony. The Academy is open to anyone, as long as they are a professional in the French video game industry, and membership is free.

== Format ==
As of 2025, the Pégases consists of 18 categories. Only games primarily developed in France are eligible for 13 of them, with 3 awards dedicated to honoring video games produced outside the country ("Best International Game", "Best International Indie Game" and "Best International Mobile Game"). The remaining 2 are honorary prizes awarded to individuals ("Person of the Year" and "Honorary Award").

The winners of these awards are presented with a Pégase, a trophy depicting one of the most famous creatures in Greek mythology, after which the ceremony is named ("Pégase" being the French cognate of Pegasus). The Pégase trophy is designed in France and crafted by the Macheret art foundry, a workshop officially labelled "Entreprise du Patrimoine Vivant" (Living Heritage Company) by the French state for its artisanal expertise. It is made of bronze with a gold-plated finish and sits on a black lacquered resin base.

The Pégase for "Person of the Year" and the "Honorary Award" are presented to individuals for their contributions to the industry; the Honorary Award being bestowed to pay tribute to the entire career of a highly accomplished professional for example. The recipients of these two individual recognitions are decided by the Steering Committee specifically rather than the Academy as a whole.

As to the other 16 awards, participation is entirely voluntary. There is no preliminary screening. Game developers must register their game and select the specific categories (within the limits set by the rules) in which they wish to compete. The Academy then verifies that basic technical and administrative criteria are met (the release date, the percentage of French production for the categories that require it, etc.). Student teams or their schools must take the initiative to submit their application for the "Best Student Video Game" category.

About 80 to 120 video games are submitted every year by studios to the Academy of Video Game Arts and Techniques for the Pégases. Theareafter, each member of the Academy, of which there are roughly 3,000 as of 2025, votes for the candidate they deem the worthiest from the list of submitted titles in each category. A ballot is then created with the most nominated games (typically 3 titles per category). Nominations are announced in early February. The members subsequently vote in a second round to determine the winner among the three nominees. Each member’s vote in both rounds is secret to ensure privacy and foster integrity.

There is, however, one exception. While the Academy as a whole does vote to determine the nominees for "Best Student Video Game" in the first round, no second-round vote takes place for this category. It is the Steering Committee that evaluates the nominated projects and determines the winning student team.

In 2022, the organization introduced a new rule to prevent any single game from winning more than five awards: with the exception of the so-called "queen categories" ("Best Video Game", "Best Independent Video Game" and "Best Mobile Game"), a title shall be submitted in no more than three categories. An "Audience Award" was bestowed in the 2022, 2023 and 2024 editions. The award for "Best Character" was replaced after the 2021 edition with the one for "Best Accessibility"; and the "Best Video Game Universe" award, with the Pégase for "Best Technological Innovation" following the 2022 edition.

During the ceremony, exclusive announcements of new games are made and never-before-seen trailers of upcoming games revealed.

== Awards ==
=== 2020 ===
The 1st annual Pégases celebrated games released in 2019. The ceremony was held at Théâtre de la Madeleine on March 9, 2020. The hosts of the event were Salomé Lagresle and Emmanuel Levy.

Best Video Game: A Plague Tale: Innocence – Asobo Studio; Life Is Strange 2 – Don't Nod; WRC 8 – Kylotonn / Bigben Interactive	Best Independent Video Game: Night Call – Monkeymoon; Crying Suns – Alt Shift; Monster Boy and the Cursed Kingdom – Game Atelier / FDG Entertainment
Best Mobile Game: Dead Cells – Motion Twin; Rayman Mini – Ubisoft Montpellier / Pastagames; Tokotoko – Kalank	Best Debut Video Game: Un Pas Fragile – Opal Games; Night Call – Monkeymoon; Unruly Heroes – Magic Design Studios
Best Student Video Game: Don't Look – CNAM-ENJMIN; Aurore – CNAM-ENJMIN; Toxic Pink! – Rubika	Beyond the Video Game: Alt-Frequencies – Accidental Queens; GreedFall – Spiders / Focus Home Interactive; Life Is Strange 2 – Don't Nod
Excellence in Visuals: A Plague Tale: Innocence – Asobo Studio; GreedFall – Spiders / Focus Home Interactive; The Wanderer: Frankenstein's Creature – La Belle Games / ARTE France	Best Audio: A Plague Tale: Innocence – Asobo Studio; Alt-Frequencies – Accidental Queens; Life Is Strange 2 – Don't Nod
Excellence in Narrative: Life Is Strange 2 – Don't Nod; Night Call – Monkeymoon; A Plague Tale: Innocence – Asobo Studio	Best Game Design: A Plague Tale: Innocence – Asobo Studio; Alt-Frequencies – Accidental Queens; Crying Suns – Alt Shift
Best Video Game Universe: A Plague Tale: Innocence – Asobo Studio; GreedFall – Spiders / Focus Home Interactive; Life Is Strange 2 – Don't Nod	Best Character: A Plague Tale: Innocence – Asobo Studio; Life Is Strange 2 – Don't Nod; Un Pas Fragile – Opal Games
Best Game as a Service: Dead Cells – Motion Twin; Frag Pro Shooter – Oh BiBi; Just Dance 2020 – Ubisoft	Best International Game: Metro Exodus – 4A Games; Apex Legends – Respawn Entertainment / Electronic Arts; Star Wars Jedi: Fallen Order – Respawn Entertainment / Electronic Arts
Best International Indie Game: Outer Wilds – Mobius Digital; Ancestors: The Humankind Odyssey – Panache Digital Games / Private Division; Pikuniku – Sectordub / Devolver Digital	Best International Mobile Game: Sayonara Wild Hearts – Simogo; Dungeons & Dragons: Warriors of Waterdeep – Ludia; Lemmings: The Puzzle Adventure – Sad Puppy
Person of the Year: Jehanne Rousseau	Honorary Award: Yves Guillemot

=== 2021 ===
The 2nd annual Pégases celebrated games released in 2020. The ceremony was held virtually on March 17, 2021. The host of the event was Salomé Lagresle.

Best Video Game: Microsoft Flight Simulator – Asobo Studio / Xbox Game Studios; Tell Me Why – Don't Nod / Xbox Game Studios; WRC 9 – Kylotonn / Nacon	Best Independent Video Game: Haven – The Game Bakers; There Is No Game: Wrong Dimension – Draw Me a Pixel; Streets of Rage 4 – Lizardcube / Guard Crush Games / Dotemu
Best Mobile Game: Ordesa – Cinétévé Expérience; Pango Bakery – Studio Pango; SpongeBob: Patty Pursuit – Old Skull Games	Best Debut Video Game: Shady Part of Me – Douze Dixièmes / Focus Home Interactive; There Is No Game: Wrong Dimension – Draw Me a Pixel; Wolcen: Lords of Mayhem – Wolcen Studio
Best Student Video Game: Symphonia – ISART Digital; Aefen Fall – Studio 9.7 / Rubika; Soul Weaver – New3dge	Beyond the Video Game: Tell Me Why – Don't Nod / Xbox Game Studios; Haven – The Game Bakers; Shady Part of Me – Douze Dixièmes / Focus Home Interactive
Excellence in Visuals: Microsoft Flight Simulator – Asobo Studio / Xbox Game Studios; Othercide – Lightbulb Crew / Focus Home Interactive; Paper Beast – Pixel Reef / Plug In Digital	Best Audio: Streets of Rage 4 – Lizardcube / Guard Crush Games / Dotemu; Double Kick Heroes – Headbang Club; Haven – The Game Bakers
Excellence in Narrative: Tell Me Why – Don't Nod / Xbox Game Studios; Haven – The Game Bakers; There Is No Game: Wrong Dimension – Draw Me a Pixel	Best Game Design: There Is No Game: Wrong Dimension – Draw Me a Pixel; Paper Beast – Pixel Reef / Plug In Digital; ScourgeBringer – Flying Oak Games / Dear Villagers
Best Video Game Universe: Paper Beast – Pixel Reef / Plug In Digital; Haven – The Game Bakers; Tell Me Why – Don't Nod / Xbox Game Studios	Best Character: Haven – The Game Bakers; Shady Part of Me – Douze Dixièmes / Focus Home Interactive; Tell Me Why – Don't Nod / Xbox Game Studios
Best Game as a Service: Microsoft Flight Simulator – Asobo Studio / Xbox Game Studios; Just Dance 2021 – Ubisoft; WRC 9 – Kylotonn / Nacon	Best International Game: Ori and the Will of the Wisps – Moon Studios / Xbox Game Studios; Iron Harvest – King Art Games / Deep Silver; Yakuza: Like a Dragon – Ryu Ga Gotoku Studio / Sega
Best International Indie Game: Hades – Supergiant Games; Kentucky Route Zero: TV Edition – Cardboard Computer / Annapurna Interactive; Raji: An Ancient Epic – Nodding Heads Games / SuperGG.com	Best International Mobile Game: If Found... – Dreamfeel / Annapurna Interactive; MudRunner – Saber Interactive / Focus Home Interactive; South of the Circle – State of Play Games
Person of the Year: Adrien Nougaret (ZeratoR)	Honorary Award: Éric Chahi

=== 2022 ===
The 3rd annual Pégases celebrated games released in 2021. The ceremony was held at La Cigale on March 10, 2022. The host of the event was Salomé Lagresle.

Best Video Game: Deathloop – Arkane Lyon; Humankind – Amplitude Studios; Road 96 – DigixArt	Best Independent Video Game: Road 96 – DigixArt; Curse of the Dead Gods – Passtech Games / Focus Entertainment; The Last Spell – Ishtar Games / The Arcade Crew
Best Mobile Game: Northgard – Shiro Games / Playdigious; Masterchef: Let's Cook – Old Skull Games; Unmaze – Upian / Hiver Prod / ARTE France	Best Debut Video Game: Solasta: Crown of the Magister – Tactical Adventures; Save Me Mr Tako: Definitive Edition – Deneos Games; Young Souls – 1P2P / The Arcade Crew
Best Student Video Game: Lysfangha – ISART Digital; Bulle – CNAM-ENJMIN; Jivana – Team Jivana / Rubika	Beyond the Video Game: Road 96 – DigixArt; Humankind – Amplitude Studios; Rubicon: A Conspiracy of Silence – Midnight Mood / La Belle Games
Excellence in Visuals: Deathloop – Arkane Lyon; Edge of Eternity – Midgar Studio / Dear Villagers; Young Souls – 1P2P / The Arcade Crew	Best Audio: Road 96 – DigixArt; Deathloop – Arkane Lyon; Humankind – Amplitude Studios
Excellence in Narrative: Road 96 – DigixArt; Assassin's Creed Valhalla: Wrath of the Druids – Ubisoft Montreal; Deathloop – Arkane Lyon	Best Game Design: Deathloop – Arkane Lyon; Humankind – Amplitude Studios; The Last Spell – Ishtar Games / The Arcade Crew
Best Video Game Universe: Deathloop – Arkane Lyon; Edge of Eternity – Midgar Studio / Dear Villagers; Road 96 – DigixArt	Best Accessibility: Road 96 – DigixArt; Just Dance 2022 – Ubisoft; Masterchef: Let's Cook – Old Skull Games
Best Game as a Service: Curse of the Dead Gods – Passtech Games / Focus Entertainment; Just Dance 2022 – Ubisoft; Riders Republic – Ubisoft Annecy	Best International Game: The Forgotten City – Modern Storyteller / Dear Villagers; Little Nightmares II – Tarsier Studios / Supermassive Games / Bandai Namco Entertainment; Psychonauts 2 – Double Fine / Xbox Game Studios
Best International Indie Game: Chicory: A Colorful Tale – Greg Lobanov / Finji; The Forgotten City – Modern Storyteller / Dear Villagers; Oddworld: Soulstorm – Oddworld Inhabitants	Best International Mobile Game: Sparklite – Red Blue Games; Lego Star Wars: Castaways – Gameloft; Summoners War: Sky Arena – Com2uS
Audience Award Deathloop – Arkane Lyon
Person of the Year: Dinga Bakaba	Honorary Award: Benoît Sokal

=== 2023 ===
The 4th annual Pégases celebrated games released in 2022. The ceremony was held at La Cigale on March 9, 2023. The host of the event was Salomé Lagresle.

Best Video Game: Stray – BlueTwelve Studio / Annapurna Interactive; A Plague Tale: Requiem – Asobo Studio / Focus Entertainment; Sifu – Sloclap	Best Independent Video Game: Stray – BlueTwelve Studio / Annapurna Interactive; Sifu – Sloclap; Tinykin – Spashteam
Best Mobile Game: Tales Up – Périple Studio; A Musical Story – Glee-Cheese Studio / Plug In Digital; Nickelodeon Extreme Tennis – Old Skull Games	Best Debut Video Game: Stray – BlueTwelve Studio / Annapurna Interactive; Onde – Lance / 3-50; Time Rift – Lightshards / Abiding Bridge
Best Student Video Game: Alaska – Artfx; Gevaudan 1851 – Piktura; Radiant Dawn – Game Sup	Beyond the Video Game: Flat Eye – Monkeymoon; Inua: A Story in Ice and Time – Pixel Hunt / IKO / ARTE France; Syberia: The World Before – Microids
Excellence in Visuals: A Plague Tale: Requiem – Asobo Studio / Focus Entertainment; Sifu – Sloclap; Stray – BlueTwelve Studio / Annapurna Interactive	Best Audio: A Plague Tale: Requiem – Asobo Studio / Focus Entertainment; Mario + Rabbids Sparks of Hope – Ubisoft Milan / Ubisoft Paris; A Musical Story – Glee-Cheese Studio / Plug In Digital
Excellence in Narrative: A Plague Tale: Requiem – Asobo Studio / Focus Entertainment; Flat Eye – Monkeymoon; Syberia: The World Before – Microids	Best Game Design: Sifu – Sloclap; Mario + Rabbids Sparks of Hope – Ubisoft Milan / Ubisoft Paris; Tinykin – Spashteam
Best Technological Innovation: Dune: Spice Wars – Shiro Games; Dual Universe – Novaquark; Fast Libero – Sporty Peppers	Best Accessibility: Steelrising – Spiders / Nacon; Arkanoid: Eternal Battle – Pastagames; Tales Up – Périple Studio
Best Game as a Service: Solasta: Crown of the Magister – Tactical Adventures; Airport Simulator: First Class – Playrion; Tales Up – Périple Studio	Best International Game: Elden Ring – FromSoftware / Bandai Namco Entertainment; God of War Ragnarök – Santa Monica Studio / Sony Interactive Entertainment; Tunic – Isometricorp Games / Finji
Best International Indie Game: Tunic – Isometricorp Games / Finji; Hardspace: Shipbreaker – Blackbird Interactive / Focus Entertainment; Teenage Mutant Ninja Turtles: Shredder's Revenge – Tribute Games / Dotemu	Best International Mobile Game: Spiritfarer – Thunder Lotus Games / Playdigious; Idle Siege – Gameloft; Marvel Snap – Second Dinner / Nuverse
Audience Award A Plague Tale: Requiem – Asobo Studio / Focus Entertainment
Person of the Year: Nicolas Cannasse	Honorary Award: Olivier Derivière

=== 2024 ===
The 5th annual Pégases celebrated games released in 2023. The ceremony was held on March 7, 2024. The hosts of the event were Salomé Lagresle and Samuel Étienne.

Best Video Game: Chants of Sennaar – Rundisc / Focus Entertainment; Assassin's Creed Mirage – Ubisoft Bordeaux; Jusant – Don't Nod	Best Independent Video Game: Chants of Sennaar – Rundisc / Focus Entertainment; Dordogne – Un Je Ne Sais Quoi / Umanimation / Focus Entertainment; Have a Nice Death – Magic Design Studios
Best Mobile Game: Valiant Hearts: Coming Home – Old Skull Games / Ubisoft Montpellier; Mighty Quest: Rogue Palace – Ubisoft Paris; The Wreck – The Pixel Hunt	Best Debut Video Game: En Garde – Fireplace Games; Dordogne – Un Je Ne Sais Quoi / Umanimation / Focus Entertainment; Pâquerette down the Bunburrows – Bunstack / Abiding Bridge
Best Student Video Game: Sikaria: A Silent Hunt – ISART Digital	Beyond the Video Game: Valiant Hearts: Coming Home – Old Skull Games / Ubisoft Montpellier; Chants of Sennaar – Rundisc / Focus Entertainment; The Wreck – The Pixel Hunt
Excellence in Visuals: Dordogne – Un Je Ne Sais Quoi / Umanimation / Focus Entertainment; Assassin's Creed Mirage – Ubisoft Bordeaux; Chants of Sennaar – Rundisc / Focus Entertainment	Best Audio: Jusant – Don't Nod; Assassin's Creed Mirage – Ubisoft Bordeaux; The Crew Motorfest – Ubisoft Ivory Tower
Excellence in Narrative: Valiant Hearts: Coming Home – Old Skull Games / Ubisoft Montpellier; Assassin's Creed Mirage – Ubisoft Bordeaux; The Wreck – The Pixel Hunt	Best Game Design: Chants of Sennaar – Rundisc / Focus Entertainment; The Crew Motorfest – Ubisoft Ivory Tower; Jusant – Don't Nod
Best Technological Innovation: Headbangers: Rhythm Royale – Glee-Cheese Studio; Aliens: Dark Descent – Tindalos Interactive / Focus Entertainment; Dragon Duelist – Sporty Peppers	Best Accessibility: KarmaZoo – Pastagames; Firebird – Ludogram / FibreTigre / Quentin Vijoux; Go Go Magnet: Fish & Merge – Oh BiBi
Best Game as a Service: The Crew Motorfest – Ubisoft Ivory Tower; Go Go Magnet: Fish & Merge – Oh BiBi; Tales Up – Périple Studio	Best International Game: Baldur's Gate 3 – Larian Studios; Cocoon – Geometric Interactive / Annapurna Interactive; Hogwarts Legacy – Avalanche Software / Warner Bros. Games
Best International Indie Game: Cocoon – Geometric Interactive / Annapurna Interactive; Party Animals – Recreate Games / Source Technology	Best International Mobile Game: Little Nightmares – Tarsier Studios / Bandai Namco Entertainment / Playdigious; Disney Dreamlight Valley Arcade Edition – Gameloft Montreal
Audience Award Assassin's Creed Mirage – Ubisoft Bordeaux
Person of the Year: Mickaël Newton	Honorary Award: Muriel Tramis

=== 2025 ===
The 6th annual Pégases celebrated games released in 2024. The ceremony was held at La Cigale on March 6, 2025. The host of the event was Samuel Étienne.

Best Video Game: Prince of Persia: The Lost Crown – Ubisoft Montpellier; Beast: Bio Exo Arena Suit Team – Oh BiBi; Ravenswatch – Passtech Games / Nacon	Best Independent Video Game: Caravan SandWitch – Plane Toast / Plug In Digital; Empire of the Ants – Tower Five / Microids; The Operator – Bureau 81
Best Mobile Game: Beast: Bio Exo Arena Suit Team – Oh BiBi; Kosma's Chronicles – Pocket Story; Mutants: Genesis – Celsius Online	Best Debut Video Game: Caravan SandWitch – Plane Toast / Plug In Digital; The Operator – Bureau 81; Symphonia – Sunny Peak
Best Student Video Game: Myrmidon – Rubika; Bloody Dates! – ISART Digital	Beyond the Video Game: Tchia – Awaceb; Kamaeru: A Frog Refuge – Humble Reeds; Threshold – Julien Eveillé / Critical Reflex
Excellence in Visuals: Empire of the Ants – Tower Five / Microids; Caravan SandWitch – Plane Toast / Plug In Digital; Microsoft Flight Simulator 2024 – Asobo Studio	Best Audio: Prince of Persia: The Lost Crown – Ubisoft Montpellier; Caravan SandWitch – Plane Toast / Plug In Digital; Symphonia – Sunny Peak
Excellence in Narrative: The Operator – Bureau 81; Banishers: Ghosts of New Eden – Don't Nod / Focus Entertainment; Worlds of Aria – Ludogram / Ishtar Games	Best Game Design: Prince of Persia: The Lost Crown – Ubisoft Montpellier; Mutants: Genesis – Celsius Online; Ravenswatch – Passtech Games / Nacon
Best Technological Innovation: Microsoft Flight Simulator 2024 – Asobo Studio; Dark Hours – Piece of Cake Studios; Hide the Corpse – Realcast / HyperVR Games	Best Accessibility: Prince of Persia: The Lost Crown – Ubisoft Montpellier; Pyrene – Two Tiny Dice / Indie Asylum; Tchia – Awaceb
Best Game as a Service: Dofus – Ankama Games; Renaissance Kingdoms – Celsius Online; Virtual Regatta – Virtual Regatta	Best International Game: Warhammer 40,000: Space Marine 2 – Saber Interactive / Focus Entertainment; Final Fantasy VII Rebirth – Square Enix; Neva – Nomada Studio / Devolver Digital
Best International Indie Game: Neva – Nomada Studio / Devolver Digital; Manor Lords – Slavic Magic / Hooded Horse; The Plucky Squire – All Possible Futures / Devolver Digital	Best International Mobile Game: Loop Hero – Four Quarters / Devolver Digital / Playdigious; Children of Morta – Dead Mage / 11 Bit Studios; Potion Permit – MassHive Media / PQube
Person of the Year: Romain de Waubert	Honorary Award: Stéphane Natkin

=== 2026 ===
The 7th annual Pégases celebrated games released in 2025. The ceremony was held at La Cigale on March 5, 2026. The host of the event was Salomé Lagresle.

Best Video Game: Clair Obscur: Expedition 33 – Sandfall Interactive / Kepler Interactive; Absolum – Guard Crush Games and Supamonks / Dotemu; The Rogue Prince of Persia – Evil Empire / Ubisoft	Best Independent Video Game: Absolum – Guard Crush Games and Supamonks / Dotemu; Rematch – Sloclap / Kepler Interactive; Sol Cesto – Géraud Zucchini, Chariospirale and Tambouille / Goblinz Publishing; Wednesdays – The Pixel Hunt and Pierre Corbinais / ARTE France
Best Mobile Game: Les Murmures du Soleil – Sacha Alzieu / Biscuit Factory; Molang Match'n Munch – Da Viking Code / Impulse Media Hub; SpongeBob: Patty Pursuit 2 – Old Skull Games / Viacom International	Best Debut Video Game: The Rogue Prince of Persia – Evil Empire / Ubisoft; Drop Duchy – Sleepy Mill Studio / The Arcade Crew; Carimara: Beneath the Forlorn Limbs – Bastinus Rex / Critical Reflex
Best Student Video Game: Candellum – ISART Digital; Barrel Roll – Rubika / Rubika Supinfogame; Memory Lane – Forget-Me-Not Studio / Rubika Supinfogame	Beyond the Video Game: Wednesdays – The Pixel Hunt and Pierre Corbinais / ARTE France; A Better World – Ludogram / ARTE France; Fireside Feelings – Team Empreintes / The CoLab
Excellence in Visuals: Clair Obscur: Expedition 33 – Sandfall Interactive / Kepler Interactive; Absolum – Guard Crush Games and Supamonks / Dotemu; The Rogue Prince of Persia – Evil Empire / Ubisoft	Best Audio: Clair Obscur: Expedition 33 – Sandfall Interactive / Kepler Interactive; Absolum – Guard Crush Games and Supamonks / Dotemu; The Rogue Prince of Persia – Evil Empire / Ubisoft
Excellence in Narrative: Clair Obscur: Expedition 33 – Sandfall Interactive / Kepler Interactive; Crown Gambit – Wild Wits Games / Playdigious; Amerzone : The Explorer's Legacy (Remake) – Microids Studio Paris / Microids; Wednesdays – The Pixel Hunt and Pierre Corbinais / ARTE France	Best Game Design: Absolum – Guard Crush Games and Supamonks / Dotemu; Drop Duchy – Sleepy Mill Studio / The Arcade Crew; Sol Cesto – Géraud Zucchini, Chariospirale and Tambouille / Goblinz Publishing
Best Technological Innovation: Rematch – Sloclap / Kepler Interactive; Plan B: Terraform – Gaddy Games; Sheepherds – Ultimo Disco	Best Accessibility: Wednesdays – The Pixel Hunt and Pierre Corbinais / ARTE France; Les Murmures du Soleil – Sacha Alzieu / Biscuit Factory; Sheepherds – Ultimo Disco
Best Game as a Service: Ravenswatch – Passtech Games / Nacon; Assassin's Creed Mirage: Valley of Memory – Ubisoft Bordeaux / Ubisoft; Microsoft Flight Simulator 2024 – Asobo Studio / Xbox Game Studios	Best International Game: Hades II – Supergiant Games; Dispatch – AdHoc Studio; Kingdom Come: Deliverance II – Warhorse Studios / Deep Silver
Best International Indie Game: Hollow Knight Silksong – Team Cherry; Dispatch – AdHoc Studio; Hades II – Supergiant Games	Best International Mobile Game: The Storyteller – Esprits Productions; Planet of Lana – Wishfully / Thunderful Publishing; Subnautica – Unknown Worlds Entertainment
Person of the Year: Alexis Garavaryan (Kepler Interactive founder and CEO)	Honorary Award: Omar Cornut (Lizardcube co-founder; author and developer of Dear ImGui)

== Records ==
=== Most Pégases won by a game ===
Awards	Game Name	Developer/Publisher
6	A Plague Tale: Innocence	Asobo Studio
5	Deathloop	Arkane Lyon
5	Road 96	DigixArt
4	A Plague Tale: Requiem	Asobo Studio / Focus Entertainment
4	Clair Obscur: Expedition 33	Sandfall Interactive / Kepler Interactive
4	Prince of Persia: The Lost Crown	Ubisoft Montpellier
3	Chants of Sennaar	Rundisc / Focus Entertainment
3	Microsoft Flight Simulator	Asobo Studio / Xbox Game Studios
3	Stray	BlueTwelve Studio / Annapurna Interactive
3	Valiant Hearts: Coming Home	Old Skull Games / Ubisoft Montpellier

=== Most Pégases won by a developer or publisher ===
Awards	Developer/Publisher
15	Asobo Studio
11	Focus Entertainment / Focus Home Interactive
9	Ubisoft
7	Kepler Interactive
6	Xbox Game Studios
5	Annapurna Interactive
5	Arkane Lyon
5	DigixArt
5	Plug In Digital / Dear Villagers
4	Playdigious
4	Sandfall Interactive
