= List of video games developed in France =

This is a list of released and upcoming video games that are developed in France. The list is sorted by game title, platform, year of release and their developer. This list does not include serious games.

| Title | Platform(s) | Year | Developer | Ref. |
|---|---|---|---|---|
| 500cc Grand Prix | Amstrad CPC, Atari ST, Commodore 64, MS-DOS | 1987 | Microïds | |
| Another World | Amiga, Atari ST | 1991 | Delphine Software | |
| Alone in the Dark | MS-DOS | 1992 | Infogrames | |
| Little Big Adventure | MS-DOS | 1994 | Adeline Software International | |
| Rayman | Playstation | 1995 | Ubi Pictures | |
| Toy Commander | Dreamcast | 1999 | No Cliché | |
| 4 Wheel Thunder | Dreamcast | 2000 | Kalisto Entertainment | |
| Charlie's Angels | PlayStation 2, GameCube | 2003 | Neko Entertainment | |
| Rayman 3: Hoodlum Havoc | PlayStation 2, Xbox, GameCube, Microsoft Windows | 2003 | Ubisoft Paris | |
| TrackMania | Microsoft Windows | 2003 | Nadeo | |
| Beyond Good & Evil | PlayStation 2, Xbox, GameCube | 2003 | Ubisoft Montpellier | |
| 7 Sins | Microsoft Windows, PlayStation 2 | 2005 | Monte Cristo | |
| Heavy Rain | PlayStation 3, PlayStation 4, Windows | 2010 | Quantic Dream | |
| Rayman Origins | Microsoft Windows, OS X, Wii, Xbox 360, PlayStation 3, PlayStation Vita, Nintendo 3DS | 2011 | Ubisoft Montpellier | |
| Dishonored | Microsoft Windows, Xbox 360, PlayStation 3, Xbox One, PlayStation 4 | 2012 | Arkane Studios | |
| Zombi U | Wii U | 2012 | Ubisoft Montpellier | |
| Rayman Legends | Microsoft Windows, Nintendo Switch, PlayStation 3, PlayStation 4, PlayStation Vita, Wii U, Xbox 360, Xbox One, Stadia | 2013 | Ubisoft Montpellier | |
| Life Is Strange | Android, iOS, Linux, Microsoft Windows, OS X, PlayStation 3, PlayStation 4, Xbox 360, Xbox One | 2015 | Dontnod Entertainment | |
| Mother Russia Bleeds | Microsoft Windows, OS X, Linux, PlayStation 4 | 2016 | Le Cartel Studio | |
| Cartoon Network: Battle Crashers | PlayStation 4, Xbox One, Nintendo 3DS, Nintendo Switch | 2016 | Magic Pockets | |
| Life Is Strange 2 | PlayStation 4, Xbox One, Microsoft Windows, macOS, Linux | 2018 | Dontnod Entertainment | |
| Demetrios the BIG Cynical Adventure | PlayStation 4, PlayStation Vita, Xbox One, Nintendo Switch, Microsoft Windows, macOS, Linux, IOS, Android | 2016 | COWCAT Games | |
| Dishonored 2 | Microsoft Windows, Xbox One, PlayStation 4 | 2016 | Arkane Studios | |
| Furi | Microsoft Windows, Xbox One, PlayStation 4, PlayStation 5, Nintendo Switch | 2016 | The Game Bakers | |
| Tom Clancy's Ghost Recon Wildlands | Microsoft Windows, Xbox One, PlayStation 4 | 2017 | Ubisoft Paris | |
| Dead Cells | Microsoft Windows, macOS, Linux, Xbox One, PlayStation 4, PlayStation 5, Nintendo Switch, iOS, Android | 2018 | Motion Twin | |
| Detroit: Become Human | Microsoft Windows, PlayStation 4 | 2018 | Quantic Dream | |
| Vampyr | Microsoft Windows, PlayStation 4, Xbox One | 2018 | Don't Nod | |
| A Plague Tale: Innocence | PlayStation 4, Windows, Xbox One, Nintendo Switch, PlayStation 5, Xbox Series X/S | 2019 | Asobo Studio | |
| A Fisherman's Tale | PlayStation 4, Microsoft Windows, Meta Quest | 2019 | InnerspaceVR | |
| Microsoft Flight Simulator | Microsoft Windows, Xbox Series X/S | 2020 | Asobo Studios | |
| There Is No Game: Wrong Dimension | Android, iOS, macOS, Nintendo Switch, Microsoft Windows | 2020 | Draw Me A Pixel | |
| Deathloop | PlayStation 5, Windows, Xbox Series X/S | 2021 | Arkane Studios | |
| Labyrinth City: Pierre the Maze Detective | Nintendo Switch, Windows, OS X | 2021 | Darjeeling | |
| Riders Republic | PlayStation 4, PlayStation 5, Stadia, Windows, Xbox One, Xbox Series X/S | 2021 | Ubisoft Annecy | |
| Road 96 | PlayStation 4, Windows, Xbox One, Nintendo Switch, PlayStation 5, Xbox Series X/S | 2021 | DigixArt | |
| Demetrios the BIG Cynical Adventure REPLASTERED | PlayStation 5 | 2022 | COWCAT Games | |
| BROK the InvestiGator | PlayStation 5, PlayStation 4, Xbox One, Nintendo Switch, Microsoft Windows, macOS, Linux | 2022 | COWCAT Games | |
| A Plague Tale: Requiem | PlayStation 5, Windows, Nintendo Switch, PlayStation 5, Xbox Series X/S | 2022 | Asobo Studio | |
| Sifu | PlayStation 4, PlayStation 5, Windows, Nintendo Switch, Xbox One, Xbox Series X/S | 2022 | Sloclap | |
| Stray | PlayStation 4, PlayStation 5, Windows, macOS, Xbox One, Xbox Series X/S, Nintendo Switch | 2022 | BlueTwelve Studio | |
| Assassin's Creed Mirage | Microsoft Windows, Xbox One, PlayStation 4, Xbox Series X/S, PlayStation 5, iOS, iPadOS | 2023 | Ubisoft Bordeaux | |
| Chants of Sennaar | Nintendo Switch, PlayStation 4, Windows, Xbox One, Android, iOS | 2023 | Rundisc | |
| Dordogne | Microsoft Windows, Nintendo Switch, PlayStation 4, PlayStation 5, Xbox One, Xbox Series X/S, iOS | 2023 | Un Je Ne Sais Quoi | |
| Prince of Persia: The Lost Crown | Microsoft Windows, Xbox One, PlayStation 4, Xbox Series X/S, PlayStation 5, Nintendo Switch, macOS, iOS, Android | 2024 | Ubisoft Montpellier | |
| Microsoft Flight Simulator 2024 | Microsoft Windows, PlayStation 5, Xbox Series X/S | 2023 | Asobo Studios | |
| Clair Obscur: Expedition 33 | PlayStation 5, Windows, Xbox Series X/S | 2025 | Sandfall Interactive | |
| Rematch | PlayStation 5, Windows, Xbox Series X/S | 2025 | Sloclap | |
| The Rogue Prince of Persia | Windows, PlayStation 5, Xbox Series X/S, Nintendo Switch, Nintendo Switch 2 | 2025 | Evil Empire | |
| Shinobi: Art of Vengeance | Nintendo Switch, PlayStation 4, PlayStation 5, Windows, Xbox One, Xbox Series X/S | 2025 | Lizardcube | |
| Absolum | Nintendo Switch, Nintendo Switch 2, PlayStation 4, PlayStation 5, Microsoft Windows, Xbox Series X/S | 2025 | Dotemu, Guard Crush Games, Supamonks | |
| MIO: Memories in Orbit | Nintendo Switch, Nintendo Switch 2, PlayStation 5, Microsoft Windows, Xbox Series X/S | 2026 | Douze Dixièmes | |
| Cairn | PlayStation 5, Microsoft Windows | 2026 | The Game Bakers | |
| Tides of Tomorrow | PlayStation 5, Microsoft Windows, Xbox Series X/S | 2026 | DigixArt | |
| Darwin's Paradox! | PlayStation 5, Microsoft Windows, Linux, Xbox Series X/S, Nintendo Switch 2 | 2026 | ZDT Studio | |
| Sol Cesto | Microsoft Windows | 2026 | Tambouille, Géraud Zucchini, Chariospirale | |
| Far Far West | Microsoft Windows | 2026 | Evil Raptor | |
| Resonance: A Plague Tale Legacy | PlayStation 5, Microsoft Windows, Xbox Series X/S | 2026 | Asobo Studios | |
| Castlevania: Belmont's Curse | Nintendo Switch, PlayStation 5, Microsoft Windows, Xbox Series X/S | 2026 | Evil Empire | |
| Windblown | Microsoft Windows | 2026 | Motion Twin | |
