= Renaissance Kingdoms =

2004 video game

- Original author: Lévan Sardjevéladzé
- Developer: Celsius Online
- Initial release: 1 November 2004
- Available in: 26 languages
- Website: www.renaissancekingdoms.com

Renaissance Kingdoms is a massively multiplayer online role-playing game, developed by Celsius online. The game allows players to control a character living in a European kingdom in the 15th century. It was created in October 2004. It was declared Best Free Online RPG 2006 by the English site GameOgre. It is mostly played in a web interface, but much of the game's decision-making occurs in the official forum. Registration is free, but there are some small benefits for players who make donations. The game is part of the universe De gloria regni, alongside Native Kingdoms and Shogun Kingdoms, two similar games, based respectively on the Aztec Empire and medieval Japan.

At the 2025 Pégases Awards, Renaissance Kingdoms was nominated for Best Game as a Service.
