= Wolcen: Lords of Mayhem =

- Developer: Wolcen Studio
- Publisher: Wolcen Studio
- Composers: Jean-Gabriel Raynaud, Cedric Baravaglio
- Engine: CryEngine 3
- Platforms: Windows; PlayStation 4 Xbox One
- Release: Windows; February 13, 2020; PlayStation 4, Xbox One; March 15, 2023
- Genre: Action role-playing
- Modes: Single-player, multiplayer

Wolcen: Lords of Mayhem is an action role-playing dungeon crawler video game developed and published by Wolcen Studios and released for Windows in February 2020 and for PlayStation 4 and Xbox One in March 2023. The dark fantasy-themed game progresses across a three-act storyline in which players explore procedurally-generated maps to battle hordes of monsters and collect valuable loot.

The player is a member of the Army of the Purifiers along with two childhood friends, and has become part of operation Dawnbane to retaliate against the Brotherhood of Dawn which has attacked a mysterious fortress.

== History ==
It was originally revealed under the name "Umbra" in 2015 and launched as a Kickstarter crowdfunding campaign that raised more than $400,000 by over 11,000 backers.

In 2016, it was announced the game would be renamed Wolcen: Lords of Mayhem while developer SolarFall Games would be renamed Wolcen Studio.

== Reception ==
Reception

Aggregate score
Aggregator	Score
Metacritic	60/100

Wolcen: Lords of Mayhem received mixed reviews. As of June 2021, on Metacritic it has a score of 60 out of 100 based on reviews from 25 critics. It has been praised for appealing to veteran players of the action RPG dungeon crawler genre, while providing less restrictive character customization and a focus on high-quality graphics. Negative reviews largely cite major bugs on release and its unrealized potential due to derivative gameplay.

IGN gave it a "mediocre" 5 out of 10 and wrote: "Once its major bugs are resolved, Wolcen's clever ideas could let it compete with the heavyweights of the action RPG genre. For now, though, too much of the mayhem is caused by bugs to recommend it."

== Awards ==
Year	Award	Category	Result	Ref.
2020	Game Audio Network Guild Awards	Best Music for an Indie Game	Nominated	
2020	Game Audio Network Guild Awards	Best Audio for an Indie Game	Nominated	
2020	Game Audio Network Guild Awards	Best Sound Design for an Indie Game	Nominated	
2020	European Game Sound Awards	Best Audio for an Indie Game	Nominated	
2020	European Game Sound Awards	Best Sound Design for an Indie Game	Nominated	
2020	European Game Sound Awards	Best Score for an Indie Game	Won	
2020	European Game Sound Awards	Best Main Theme for a Video Game	Won	
2020	Movie Music UK Awards	Best Original Score for a Video Game	Nominated	
2020	National Academy of Video Game Trade Reviewers Awards	Outstanding Original Dramatic Score, New IP	Nominated	
2020	National Academy of Video Game Trade Reviewers Awards	Best Lighting/Texturing	Nominated	
2021	TIGA Awards	Best Audio Design	Nominated	
2021	Pégases	Best First Game	Nominated	
2023	Jerry Goldsmith Awards	Best Original Score for a Videogame	Nominated	
