= Drop Duchy =

2025 video game

- Developer: Sleepy Mill Studio
- Publisher: The Arcade Crew
- Platforms: Windows; Xbox Series X/S; Nintendo Switch; PlayStation 5
- Release: 5 May 2025: Windows; 5 May 2025; Xbox Series X/S; 28 January 2026; Nintendo Switch, PlayStation 5; 21 April 2026
- Mode: Single-player

Drop Duchy is a 2025 video game that blends roguelike deck-building and organisation puzzles into a hybrid Tetris-style PvE gameplay. It was developed by French game studio Sleepy Mill Studio and published by The Arcade Crew. The game was initially released on Steam on 5 May 2025. "Drop Duchy Complete Edition" later launched on Xbox Series X/S on 28 January 2026, debuting on Xbox Game Pass. Versions for Nintendo Switch and PlayStation 5 released on 21 April 2026.

== Gameplay ==
=== Playthrough ===
Drop Duchy is a single-player video game that combines roguelike deck-building and Tetris-style PvE gameplay. The player chooses a faction, each with unique mechanics, cards, and abilities, before starting a "run" or playthrough. Each run is divided into three acts of increasing difficulty, each act consisting of a mix of battles, trading posts, resource collection points, and other deck-building locations. At the end of each act, the player will face a unique boss. During a battle, the player must use their collected cards and the given terrain pieces in a Tetris style game. By finishing rows and strategically placing pieces, the player collects resources and can build a military, used to fight against the enemy in that round, which the player must also place pieces for. To develop more resources and defeat the enemy more easily, the player can upgrade their deck with new buildings and cards between rounds at various locations selected by the players route.

==== Gameplay mechanics ====
Gameplay revolves around different shaped "blocks" that drop from the top of the screen to the bottom in a Tetris-like style. Each block is either a terrain piece or a building piece. There are various types of terrains, including forest, plains, and rivers. The buildings provide the player with either resources or military units. When the player completes a horizontal row or line, they "explore" the row. This provides them with the resources of the placed terrain in the row. For example, the player will receive some wood for every wood piece in the explored row. They continue placing the various shaped blocks until a block exceeds the 13 square tall playing area.

===== Buildings =====
There are various types of buildings, each with their own set of abilities and category. Two common building types are production buildings and military buildings. Production buildings will provide the player with resources, whereas military buildings will provide the player with military units to use in that battle. Often the position of the building determines how or whether the building functions, depending on the specific type of building it is. The player will also have to place enemy buildings, which will provide military for the enemy.

===== Military =====
There are three types of military units, archers, axemen, and swordsmen. Each are developed through specific buildings placed by the player. Throughout the round, the player aims to build a stronger military than their opponent. They develop their military by placing their own military buildings in a way which activates the building, therefore providing units. As the player must also place enemy military units, as the round progresses, they will also be developing (or aiming not to) their enemies military.

Each unit type has a unit type that it is stronger against, and a unit type that it is weaker against, comparable to a rock-paper-scissors style format. For example, swordsmen are 50% stronger against archers, 50% weaker against axemen, and equal against other swordsmen. This means that if five swordsmen faced off against 8 archers, although there are more archers, the swordsmen would win. The combat advantages are as follows: Swordsmen are stronger than archers, archers are stronger than axemen, and axemen are stronger than swordsmen.

===== Battles =====
At the end of the round, the players military units face off against the enemies units in a battle. Here, the player chooses the sequence of the battle, choosing which units face off against each other. The player selects their own units, and chooses which of the enemies units they should face, and in what order. This allows the player to take advantage of the various combat advantages if they choose to. The player can choose to combine different groups of units, where they can merge one unit-type into another. The side whose armies are defeated first loses, and the side with the remaining military wins the battle.

If the player wins the battle, they progress onwards. If the player loses, the number of opponent militia left will be subtracted from their total lives. At the start of a standard game, the player begins with 50 lives. When this reaches 0, the player is eliminated, and therefore must start their "run" again, replicating the Roguelike genre.

==== Deck-building ====
As the player progresses in their playthrough, they can collect new cards (buildings or when unlocked, development cards) to improve their deck. Using the resources gathered from exploring rows, they can also upgrade their current cards. They can also sell cards for gold.

==== End of a run ====
The aim of the main game is to progress through all three acts, defeating all three bosses. Once the player defeats the third and final boss, they have the option to progress onto "endless mode" where the game continues to provide the player with increasingly difficult battles. If at any point the player loses all their factions health, their run ends, and they must start again.

=== Progression ===
Drop Duchy uses meta-progression, allowing the player to use a technology tree to permanently unlock new cards, factions, and unique gameplay mechanics that once unlocked, can be used across all playthroughs. The player uses crowns to purchase these upgrades which are attained via completion of the games missions; challenges which require the player to achieve specific criteria on any given playthrough, or across many. There are over 100 missions in the complete edition of the game.

== Development and release ==
Drop Duchy was the first project of Paris, France-based developer Sleepy Mill Studio. Published by The Arcade Crew, it was first released on 5 May 2025, on Steam for Windows, and on 28 January 2026, on Xbox Game Pass for Xbox Series X/S. Further releases on PlayStation 5 and Nintendo Switch were released on 21 April 2026.

On September 15, publisher Doghowl Games announced a mobile version of Drop Duchy for Android and iOS platforms, scheduled for release on September 29.

=== DLC and updates ===
Following the release of Drop Duchy in May 2025, the game has received two DLC updates. These are "The Tribe DLC" and "The North DLC". Both added new playable factions for the player.

"The Tribe DLC" was the first to be released, launching on 18 August 2025. It added "The Tribe", a playable faction inspired by mystical druids and ancient monuments. The faction came with four buildings and four unique technologies, alongside a new quest line with twelve new challenges. The update also bought a new mechanic; "constellations". These are rechargeable abilities that the player can activate following a certain amount of block placements. The update also added "endless mode" where the player can continue their playthrough after defeating the final boss in act three.

"The North DLC" released on 5 December 2025. It added "The North" playable faction, inspired by Vikings. The faction released with eight new cards and a new faction quest line. The DLC also released a new mode, named "ascension mode" where the player selects modifiers that make the game harder in order to progress through different tiers, unlocking exclusive rewards. New bosses were also added in the DLC.

== Reception ==
Reception

Aggregate scores
Aggregator	Score
Metacritic	83/100
OpenCritic	89% recommend

Review scores
Publication	Score
The Games Machine (UK)	8.5/10
The Guardian	4/5
Vandal	8.5/10

Drop Duchy received "generally favourable" reviews, according to review aggregation website Metacritic. Fellow review aggregator OpenCritic assessed that the game received strong approval, being recommended by 89% of critics.

The Games Machine reviewed the game positively, describing the gameplay as fluid, praising the hybridization between real-time strategy and a puzzle game, and finding the game replayable.

Drop Duchy's use of mechanics from multiple game genres received mixed feedback. Writing for The Guardian, Keith Stuart described it as "an ingenious experiment in game design by combination". Kevin Purdy of Ars Technica complimented the gameplay loop and found the combos satisfying, commenting that he kept returning to the game, but contended that the game did not seamlessly merge its genre influences and that it was unbalanced. Rock Paper Shotgun's Brendan Caldwell felt similarly, commenting that "the elegance of Tetris clashes with the complexity of both deckbuilding and tactical numberwang". Writing for Vandal, Juan Rubio commented positively on the genre integration.

Vandal's Rubio complimented the aesthetics of the game, feeling that the interface and aesthetic meshed well. On the other hand, Ars Technica's Purdy felt that buildings and icons looked too small and similar.

The game won "Excellence in Game Design" at the 2025 indie DevGAMM awards. It was also nominated in two categories ("Best Debut Video Game" and "Best Game Design") at the 2026 Pégases Awards, and nominated for "Strategy/Simulation Game of the Year" at the 29th Annual D.I.C.E. Awards.
