= Wednesdays (video game) =

2025 video game

- Developers: Pierre Corbinais; The Pixel Hunt
- Publisher: ARTE France
- Platforms: Windows, Mac
- Release: 25 March 2025
- Genre: Adventure
- Mode: Single-player

Wednesdays is a 2025 video game developed by Pierre Corbinais and The Pixel Hunt, and published by ARTE France for Microsoft Windows and Macintosh. The game is an interactive adventure video game that explores the memories of Timothée, a character who experienced incest and sexual abuse as a child. Upon release, Wednesdays received praise for its handling of its themes, it was nominated for a Nuovo Award and Excellence in Narrative Award at the 2026 Independent Games Festival and won the Audience Award. It also won the Aware Game Awards at BLON 2026.

== Gameplay ==
Player interaction with Orca Park, a fictional management simulation video game, reveals the memories of the game's protagonist.

The game is played in two modes: as an adventure game with interactive narrative sequences, and as a management game in the fictional game Orco Park. In Orco Park, players control the protagonist's character as if he were playing the game, with the construction of attractions and rides in the park triggering seventeen narrative sequences. Players are able to skip scenes of the game at any time through the pause menu.

== Plot ==
Timothée, a man who experienced sexual abuse as a child, plays Orco Park, a computer game from his childhood that he has not played in over twenty years. As Timothée completes elements of the park, memories of various events are revealed through the perspective of Timothée's friends, family, teacher and girlfriend, representing turning points in his life.

== Development and release ==
Development of Wednesdays developed by The Pixel Hunt, a seven-person team in collaboration with ARTE France, including French lead writer and designer Pierre Corbinais, who had previously written Bury Me, My Love. Corbinais stated that the aim of the game was to raise awareness of incest. The game was developed by Christophe Galati, the developer of Save me Mr Tako. The visuals of Wednesdays were created by artists Exaheva, who made the game's illustrations, and Nico Nowak, who designed the pixel art for Orco Park. The game was released on 26 March 2025.

== Reception ==
Reception

Aggregate score
Aggregator	Score
Metacritic	89/100

Wednesdays received generally favorable reviews from critics, according to the review aggregation website Metacritic. Several critics considered the subject matter of Wednesdays important and impactful, with Adventure Gamers stating the game was a "unique and meaningful experience" that featured a "powerful narrative". Finding the game emotionally and personally resonant, Charlie Kelly of Checkpoint Gaming praised its "artful" and "delicate" representation of CPTSD, stating it "emphasises the importance of the power that can come in finding your voice and leaning in on others. Kelly commended the game's use of content warnings and similar features to accommodate players. Similarly, Shaun Cichacki of Vice complimented the "natural, mature, and respectful manner" of the game's narrative, and its evocation of these themes with "color and humour" and "stunning" visuals. Cosmin Vasile of Softpedia wrote that the game was "well-written" in its exploration of a difficult subject, highlighting its positive focus on "healing and what the future has to offer...without giving into despair", although considered its gameplay was limited.

=== Accolades ===
Wednesdays was nominated for several awards at the 2026 Independent Games Festival, including the Nuovo Award and the Excellence in Narrative Award.
