= The Operator (video game) =

- Developer: Bureau 81
- Publisher: Bureau 81, indienova
- Designer: Bastien Giafferi
- Platforms: Windows, macOS, Linux, Nintendo Switch
- Release: July 22, 2024 (PC); May 22, 2025 (Switch)
- Genres: Adventure, puzzle
- Mode: Single-player

The Operator is a 2024 detective puzzle video game developed by French studio Bureau 81 and published by Bureau 81 and indienova. Created primarily by developer Bastien Giafferi, the game follows a government analyst investigating crimes through a simulated computer interface. It was released for Windows, macOS, and Linux on July 22, 2024, followed by a Nintendo Switch version on May 22, 2025.

== Gameplay ==
The Operator is set in 1992. Players play the role of Evan Tanner, a newly recruited analyst for the Federal Department of Information (FDI). Players assist field agents in solving murders, disappearances, and other crimes by analyzing evidence.

Investigations involve searching databases, examining photographs and video recordings, and performing chemical analyses.

== Development and release ==
The Operator was created primarily by Bastien Giafferi, founder of Bureau 81. Giafferi cited the television series The X-Files as an inspiration, particularly scenes involving technicians assisting investigators. The game's interface-focused design was also influenced by his experience creating visual art.

The game sold approximately 50,000 copies during its first month. By January 2025, third-parties estimated total sales between 110,000 and 160,000 copies, with estimated revenue exceeding $1 million.

== Reception ==
The Operator received generally favorable reviews, earning a score of 78 out of 100 on review aggregator Metacritic based on 15 critic reviews. Alice Bell of PCGamesN gave it 6 out of 10, praising its inventive puzzles while criticizing the limited depth of its narrative.

At the 2025 Pégases Awards, The Operator won the award for Narrative Excellence.
