= Caravan SandWitch =

2024 exploration adventure game

- Game Cover
- Developer: Studio Plane Toast
- Publisher: Dear Villagers
- Director: Émi Lefévre
- Designer: Robin Chrétien
- Programmer: Adrien Lucas
- Artist: Charles Boury
- Writer: Pauline Marlière
- Composer: Antynomy
- Engine: Unreal Engine 5
- Platforms: Microsoft Windows; PlayStation 5; Nintendo Switch; Android; iOS
- Release: Nintendo Switch, PlayStation 5, Windows; September 12, 2024; Android, iOS; August 4, 2026
- Genre: Adventure
- Mode: Single-player

Caravan SandWitch is an adventure video game developed by Studio Plane Toast and published by Dear Villagers. It was released for Microsoft Windows, PlayStation 5 and Nintendo Switch on September 12, 2024, and Mobile for both Android and iOS on August 4, 2026.

== Gameplay ==
In Caravan SandWitch, the players control Sauge, who is searching for her missing sister, Garance, in a post-apocalyptic world. The world exploration is free, whether in van or on foot, with no combat or danger. The game features van customization, character interactions and puzzle-solving.

== Development and release ==
Caravan SandWitch was created by Emi and Adrien and developed by Studio Plane Toast, an independent game development studio based in France. The game's development began in 2020, with a team of around 10-15 developers working on the project.

The game's art style was designed with a focus on vibrant colors and detailed environments. The game's soundtrack was composed by Antynomy, a french composer, who aimed to create a haunting and atmospheric score that complemented the game's narrative.

== Reception ==
Caravan SandWitch received "generally favorable reviews" per the review aggregator Metacritic for the Microsoft Windows and Nintendo Switch releases, and "mixed or average reviews" for the PlayStation 5 release. Fellow review aggregator OpenCritic assessed that the game received fair approval, being recommended by 63% of critics.

Some critics praised the game's visuals, sound design, and narrative, while others criticized the game's pacing and lack of challenge.

=== Awards ===
Year	Award	Category	Result	Ref.
2025	Pégases	Best Independent Video Game	Won	
2025	Pégases	Best First Video Game	Won	
2025	Pégases	Visual Excellence	Nominated	
