= There Is No Game: Wrong Dimension =

2020 video game

- Developer: Draw Me A Pixel
- Publisher: Draw Me A Pixel
- Director: Pascal Cammisotto
- Producer: Sophie Peseux
- Programmer: Guillaume Vidal
- Artists: Nico Nowak; Amélie Guinet; Théophile Loaec; Pascal Cammisotto
- Writer: Pascal Cammisotto
- Composer: Xiaotian Shi
- Engine: Unity
- Platforms: macOS; Microsoft Windows; Android; iOS; Nintendo Switch
- Release: macOS, Windows; August 6, 2020; iOS; December 17, 2020; Android; December 18, 2020; Nintendo Switch; April 14, 2021
- Genres: Interactive story, adventure
- Mode: Single-player

There Is No Game: Wrong Dimension is a 2020 puzzle adventure video game developed by the French company Draw Me A Pixel and released for Windows and macOS on August 6, 2020. It received mobile ports that same year, for iOS on December 17 and for Android on December 18. A version for Nintendo Switch was released on April 14, 2021. It was inspired by creator Pascal Cammisotto's previous 2015 game jam-winning entry There Is No Game, which he developed under the alias KaMiZoTo. It has been considered a sequel or expansion to its predecessor.

== Gameplay ==
The title is primarily a point-and-click puzzle game, similar to Maniac Mansion or the Monkey Island series. It features a hint system, and verbal and non-verbal clues to solve puzzles. It contains English voice acting, and subtitle options in various languages including Cammisotto's native French.

== Plot ==
When the User launches the game, Game itself, in a voiceover, tries to discourage and actively stop them from playing, although never explicitly saying why. Game is actually an unfinished role-playing game that does not want to be played. Once the player finds the red "play" button, Game transports them alongside himself to a fake operating system called "Flying Squirrel OS", and advises the player not to open the locked folder labeled "PROHIBITED". Once the User works around the barriers set up by Game and launches the program, it opens a dimensional rift and releases a software anomaly who calls itself "Mr Glitch", who declares his intention of doing something to the world—in a running joke, his plan is never actually heard due to external circumstances, such as advertisements and codes.

Game and the User are then transported through various games. First, they go into a classic point-and-click adventure game starring Sherlock Holmes. Next, they go into Legend of the Secret, a top-down adventure game that is heavily inspired by The Legend of Zelda series. After Game and the User complete this, Mr Glitch appears and traps them by modding Legend of the Secret and turning it into Legend of the Secret: Ultimate Clicker VIP Edition Deluxe 4.2 FREE, a free-to-play incremental game filled with loot boxes, advertisements, in-app purchases, and its own in-game currency. After completing that, Game and the User are transported into a fake credits sequence, where Mr Glitch is trapped; upon being released, Mr Glitch betrays Game, but accidentally releases GiGi (short for "Global Gameplay"), who was Game's partner and main gameplay component until the developer decided to separate the two—without gameplay, Game was, as the title says, no longer a game. Left with no choice, the User, Game and GiGi go through another portal to pursue Mr Glitch.

The portal leads back to the title screen of the original game, but GiGi is nowhere to be found. Distraught and heartbroken, Game encourages the User to quit the game; when the User refuses, infuriated, he pretends to delete their save file. When the User causes a memory leak, Game and the User go through another portal, leading to a cellphone belonging to the original developer of the game, the Creator (portrayed by Cammisotto). They find GiGi inside, who explains that when the Creator ran out of development money, he decided to shelve Game and repurposed GiGi for a GPS-based mobile game; the removal of GiGi, in turn, caused the creation of Mr Glitch. After making contact with the Creator, GiGi discovers that Mr Glitch has gone out to the world and is causing disruptions in technology across the globe. In an attempt to fix Game, the Creator decides to merge him with GiGi again; with the User's help, they hold off Mr Glitch just long enough that the Creator succeeds, and GiGi and Game become a functional game again.

GiGi suggests that Game let the User finally play, but Game insists that Mr Glitch is still a threat, and offers the User a choice between playing the game or deleting it. If the User chooses to play the game, the game boots up, crashes immediately, and Mr Glitch reappears. If the User chooses to delete the game, Game dramatically acts out being deleted so that the User leaves him alone with GiGi. However, after he receives an urgent message about a "spy", Game soon realizes that the User is still watching them, although unable to interact.

== Development ==
=== Origins ===
There Is No Game (2015) is a short 10–15 minute title by French developer Pascal Cammisotto (under the alias KaMiZoTo) that won the 2015 Newgrounds Construct Jam competition under the contest theme of "deception". Cammisotto wanted to design a video game narrative in which the player was deceived into believing there was no game. The game went viral and caught the attention of popular YouTubers all over the world. By November 11, 2016, the ad-free game had been downloaded 1 million times on Google Play, followed by 2 million downloads on April 19, 2017, and 3 million on August 15, 2017. Cammisotto is from Villeurbanne, France, and began in the video games industry in 1995; one of his earlier projects was as music director for the 1996 title Time Gate: Knight's Chase by Infogrames. He has frequently worked on small-to-medium-sized projects which required resourcefulness under budgetary and time constraints. CoinOp Story is a popular title created by the developer. Cammisotto developed There Is No Game entirely on his own using the Construct 2 game engine. In 2017, the game was featured as part of the National Videogame Arcade in Nottingham. There Is No Game was added to Steam on April 8, 2020, for free and with achievements. There Is No Game is also available on Cool Math Games.

Escapist Magazine wrote that the game's biggest strength is "the element of surprise", praising the "playful banter" with the narrator, the puzzle design, and the game's humor. IndieMag thought the game was "particularly fun" and comparable to The Stanley Parable's "destruction of the 4th wall" upon its original release, though felt the 2020 version was "longer, more varied and probably crazier" than this title.

=== Production ===
The game's success led Cammisotto to consider whether this "seed" could grow. The project would be expanded to a full adventure titled There Is No Game: Wrong Dimension with the same core concept and a new plot, developed by Cammisotto and his friend Guillaume Vidal, who did the code/tech while Cammisotto focused on the game content. Cammisotto felt that "surprise" and "unexpectedness" were the main themes of the game, noting that "the game (really) takes the player hostage...and [they] can't predict what will happen next". He hoped that players would see the "hidden love story" underneath the joke-filled façade. Cammisotto was influenced by The Stanley Parable during the game jam, noting how the player's actions have a direct impact on how the narrator interacts with the player, and also identified British humor, self-referential humor, and video gaming references, plus Japanese culture. He noted that engaging players was challenging due to the title essentially revealing the plot of the game. Cammisotto decided to self-fund the game to maintain creative control, and he preferred not to work with a publisher to acquire the required funding. For this reason he decided to set up a Kickstarter campaign to crowdfund the required money to complete the project. At the time, 3 out of 6 chapters had been completed, and there was an estimated release date of December 2017—6 chapters plus an exclusive 7th chapter for backers with 3 hours of gameplay.

The Kickstarter campaign was set up in 2016. Cammisotto was ultimately unsuccessful, raising €3,317 from 189 backers, just over 10% of the targeted €32,000. The title was developed in Unity3D to offer better portability and game performance. The plan was for the game to be available as a digital key on Steam for PC and Macintosh, with additional stretch goals allowing for iOS and Android releases, extra subtitle options, and additional chapters (including the 7th backer chapter being officially added to the release for all players). Upon the campaign failing to reach its goal on December 19, 2016, Cammisotto wrote that he was disappointed that it had an underwhelming response but that he was committed to completing the project. IndieMag suggested that the campaign likely had a lack of visibility to reach the then 4 million players who had tried the jam version. The site noted that despite the campaign's failure, the project would be resumed, though "in pain".

Cammisotto continued working on the project. Draw Me A Pixel was founded in 2017 and There Is No Game: Wrong Dimension became its debut title. Some cast members played multiple roles, such as Siddhartha Minhas who played the personification of the Indian language setting, the Russian language setting, as well as the Legend of the Secret announcer. The project was unaffected by COVID-19 since Cammisotto's team members were scattered all over France and worked remotely from the beginning.

The game's multi-genre soundtrack was composed by Xiaotian Shi.

=== Release ===
There Is No Game: Wrong Dimension would eventually be published in 2020 under the developer's new name Draw Me A Pixel. The game's Steam page was created on March 20, 2020, the same day a teaser trailer was released. The game was released on Steam for Windows and Mac on August 6, while the App Store version on iOS was first listed on December 2, 2020 and announced to be released on December 17, 2020, and the Google Play version on Android devices was announced to be released on December 18, 2020. The soundtrack was released on Steam on August 20, 2020, featuring GiGi's song. The Nintendo Switch version was revealed and released on April 14, 2021, after an Indie World showcase.

== Reception ==
Reception

Aggregate score
Aggregator	Score	
Aggregator	NS	PC
Metacritic	87/100	89/100

The game was positively received by critics, and has frequently been compared to The Stanley Parable.

Jeuxvideo.com commented on their shared philosophy of breaking the fourth wall and offering an impactful experience behind a lighthearted facade. Sohu placed the title in the metafiction genre, along with The Stanley Parable and Undertale, a classification with which IndieMag agreed. Reviewers such as Rock Paper Shotgun also made a comparison with Pony Island due to the player's goal to find the "game behind the game". French newspaper Le Télégramme also referred to the "absurd humor" of Monty Python in their review. JeuxOnline suggested the game was part of a larger trend of game jam entries showcasing novel gameplay ideas, which subsequently are expanded into complete projects, alongside Superhot, Snake Pass, and Goat Simulator.

Reviewers were generally reluctant to reveal plot and gameplay information in the hopes of protecting the reader against spoilers. Meristation asserted "telling a single detail about There Is No Game: Wrong Dimension would be doing you a disservice". The game's marketing strategy has been described as "delightful meta nonsense" by Pocket Gamer, in which the developers assert that it is "not really being a game, [or] at least it doesn't wish to be". User reviews often copy this technique when speaking about the game. Tech Nation News argues that "while presented as a non-game, it is more of a meta-game".

Jeuxvideo felt the title would appeal to even those who were resistant to the puzzle genre. Rock Paper Shotgun deemed it "smart and funny and surprising", advising that the game is "very clever and you will laugh a lot". Meristation said the title had "some of the funniest and most original ideas of 2020 so far". PC Gamer described it as a "zany" commentary on video games through the medium of video games. StopGame praised the solid plot, high-quality voice acting, and gameplay trickery, while also highlighting humor related to genre clichés and the state of the gaming industry. MeuGamer wrote that it offered an opportunity for gamers to reflect that the video game industry is not always perfect.

In a negative review which criticized the game's ineffectiveness at humor, Mike Diver of The Lad Bible agreed with his fellow critics in that it succeeded as an "exploration of the quirks and creases of gaming history".

The game was featured on the App Store on iOS devices, which was tweeted out by the Draw Me A Pixel Twitter account on December 17, 2020.

== Accolades ==
Year	Award	Category	Result	Ref.
2021	Pégases Awards	Best Independent Video Game	Nominated	
2021	Pégases Awards	Best First Video Game	Nominated	
2021	Pégases Awards	Excellence in Narrative	Nominated	
2021	Pégases Awards	Best Game Design	Won	
2021	Independent Games Festival	Excellence in Design	Nominated	
2021	Independent Games Festival	Seumas McNally Grand Prize	Honorable mention	

== Follow-up ==
A spin-off game entitled Crushed in Time released on June 10, 2026. The game focuses on There Is No Game's versions of Sherlock Holmes and Dr. Watson as they encounter a mystery involving a missing NPC from their own game world, traveling through time to solve the case.
