= Shady Part of Me =

Platform-puzzle video game

- Developer: Douze Dixièmes
- Publisher: Focus Home Interactive
- Producer: Sarah Hourcade
- Writers: Sybil Collas; Sarah Hourcade
- Composer: Nicolas Gueguen
- Platforms: Microsoft Windows; Nintendo Switch; PlayStation 4 Xbox One
- Release: WW: 10 December 2020
- Genre: Puzzle-platform
- Mode: Single-player

Shady Part of Me is puzzle-platform video game developed by Douze Dixièmes and published by Focus Home Interactive for Microsoft Windows, Nintendo Switch, PlayStation 4 and Xbox One.

== Development ==
Shady Part of Me was developed by Douze Dixièmes, an independent video game studio established in 2017, and co-produced by Focus Home Interactive. The game was produced by Sarah Hourcade, who was a landscape architect before founding Douze Dixièmes.

== Release ==
The game was announced at The Game Awards 2020 and released on the same day.

== Reception ==
Reception

Aggregate scores
Aggregator	Score
Metacritic	PC: 78/100; PS4: 78/100; XONE: 80/100; NS: 73/100
OpenCritic	75% recommend

Review score
Publication	Score
Adventure Gamers	3.5/5

Shady Part of Me received "generally favorable" reviews according to review aggregator Metacritic. Fellow review aggregator OpenCritic assessed that the game received strong approval, being recommended by 75% of critics.
