= Un pas fragile =

- Developer: Un pas fragile Team
- Publisher: Opal Games
- Designer: Géraud de Courrèges
- Platforms: Android, iOS, Microsoft Windows
- Release: 24 June 2019
- Mode: Single-player

Un pas fragile (A delicate step in French.) is an adventure game developed by Un pas fragile Team and published by French company Opal Games for Android, iOS and Microsoft Windows in 2019.

== Plot ==
Camille is a frog who dreams of becoming a ballet dancer.

== Gameplay ==
Un pas fragile features slices of the life of Camille. The player has to interact with each scene to progress in the game. The game does not use text.

== Development ==
The development of the game began as a student project in ENJMIN school in Angoulême, France. The game was submitted to Independent Games Festival at the end of the school year and then reworked until its release in 2019.

== Reception ==
Prior to its release, Un pas fragile won Best Student Game during Independent Games Festival 2017 and an honorable mention in Excellence in Visual Art.

In 2020, the game was reviewed by French website Gamekult compared the game to a "candy box that should be shared so everyone can taste its subtle and fizzy taste". French magazine JV - Culture jeu vidéo also wrote the game "has a true sensitivity and a touching restraint". Jeuxvideo.com called it "excellent and very cute".

The game obtained the Pégase Award for Best First Game and was nominated for Best Character alongside A Plague Tale: Innocence and Life Is Strange 2. The game was also nominated at Ping Awards for Best Indie Game.
