= Absolum =

- Developers: Guard Crush Games; Supamonks
- Publisher: Dotemu (Note: Mobile port by Playdigious)
- Directors: Jordi Asensio; Cyrille Lagarigue; Maxime Mary; Micke Moisa
- Producers: Micke Moisa; Azouz Mengullat; Morgane Lemaire; Guillaume Ginier
- Designer: Jordi Asensio
- Programmer: Cyrille Lagarigue
- Artist: Maxime Mary
- Writers: Fanny Renard; Gautier Knittel
- Composer: Gareth Coker (Note: Guest compositions by Mick Gordon, Yuka Kitamura, and Motoi Sakuraba)
- Platforms: Nintendo Switch; PlayStation 4; PlayStation 5; Windows; Xbox Series X/S; Nintendo Switch 2; Android; iOS
- Release: Switch, PS4, PS5, Windows; October 9, 2025; Xbox Series X/S; March 25, 2026; Nintendo Switch 2; September 17, 2026; Android, iOS; November 5, 2026
- Genres: Beat'em up, roguelike
- Modes: Single-player, multiplayer

Absolum is a 2025 beat'em up video game with roguelike elements. Developed by Guard Crush Games and Supamonks, it was published by Dotemu for Nintendo Switch, PlayStation 4, PlayStation 5, Windows, Xbox Series X/S, Nintendo Switch 2, Android and iOS.

== Gameplay ==
In this gameplay screenshot, Galandra is fighting against enemies using her sword.

Absolum is a side-scrolling beat'em up video game. It features multiple character classes, with each having its own unique combat style and abilities. Karl is a dwarf who fights enemies with his guns and bare fists; Galandra the elf is equipped with a huge sword; Cider is an agile character who wields two daggers which allow them to attack quickly; Brome is a humanoid frog and a wizard who can surf in the air using his scepter. Each character has a basic light and heavy attack. Consecutive attacks against an enemy will build up combos and mana for the player character, which can be used to unleash "Arcana", a special attack that can deal significant damage to their opponents. Players can also dodge or sidestep to avoid incoming attacks. Dodging or attacking an opponent just before their hit lands on the player character will deflect it, leaving them in a stunned state.

The game also features elements commonly found in roguelike games. At the beginning of each run, the player character can equip themselves with "Rituals", which are passive abilities and bonuses that alter their attacks. As players clear combat encounters, they will unlock more Rituals for use in combat, though all Rituals equipped will be lost if the player character is killed in combat. Level layout is not randomized but the player is able to choose their path. The Rituals players found in a level is randomized. Defeated players will return to a realm where they can recover their health and shop for new upgrades or permanent unlocks before they go for their next run. Defeating a boss may unlock "Inspirations", which are active combat skills. The game also features elements found in role-playing video games, such as side quests and diverging paths. The game also supports two-player cooperative multiplayer.

== Plot ==
Absolum is set in the fantasy world of Talamh, which is ruled by the tyrannical Sun King Azra and his army of zealots known as the "Crimson Order". In response, the sorceress Uchawi leads a resistance group composed of four warriors: Galandra, an elven swordswoman; Karl, a dwarven fighter; Cider, a mysterious assassin with mechanical limbs; and Brome, an anthropomorphic frog with magic powers. The warriors fight Azra's forces all the way to his stronghold and defeat him. However, it is revealed that Azra's main objective was to contain and control a powerful interdimensional being known as "Absolum" that could destroy the entire Talamh, and that Uchawi was Azra's wife, pregnant with his child. After Uchawi gives birth, the warriors return to Azra's palace and defeat Absolum, who is taken away by three otherworldly creatures.

== Development ==
The game was developed by Guard Crush Games, one of the co-developers of Streets of Rage 4. It was also the first original intellectual property by Dotemu, which had previously published several beat'em up games under the license of other publishers. Both studios were interested in creating a new video game instead of reviving another dormant franchise, and seek to introduce the beat'em up genre to a new audience. As a result, Guard Crush Games added roguelike elements into the game, after briefly experimenting with it in Mr. X Nightmare, a downloadable content pack for Streets of Rage 4. The team cited Golden Axe, Dead Cells and Dungeons & Dragons: Shadow over Mystara as their sources of inspiration. Absolum is also the first video game project for Supamonks, the French studio which crafted the game's art and animation.

Dotemu officially revealed the game in March 2025. It was released on October 9, 2025 for Nintendo Switch, PlayStation 4, PlayStation 5 and Windows. Silver Lining Interactive launched physical copies of Absolum for PlayStation 5 and Nintendo Switch shortly afterward. An Xbox Series X/S port of the game was released on March 25, 2026. It was available to Xbox Game Pass subscribers at launch.

== Reception ==
Reception

Aggregate scores
Aggregator	Score
Metacritic	(NS) 90/100 (PC) 87/100 (PS5) 87/100
OpenCritic	97% recommend

Absolum received "generally favorable" reviews, according to review aggregator website Metacritic. Fellow review aggregator OpenCritic assessed that the game received "mighty" approval, being recommended by 97% of critics.

=== Sales ===
Absolum sold over 200,000 copies in its first week. By the end of January 2026, it had surpassed the milestone of 500,000 copies sold.

=== Accolades ===
Year	Award	Category	Result	Ref.
2025	The Game Awards 2025	Best Independent Game	Nominated	
2026	29th Annual D.I.C.E. Awards	Action Game of the Year	Nominated	
2026	26th Game Developers Choice Awards	Best Visual Art	Nominated	
2026	7th Pégases	Best Video Game	Nominated	
2026	7th Pégases	Best Independent Video Game	Won	
2026	7th Pégases	Best Game Design	Won	
2026	7th Pégases	Excellence in Visuals	Nominated	
2026	7th Pégases	Best Audio	Nominated	
2026	22nd British Academy Games Awards	New Intellectual Property	Longlisted	
