= Sol Cesto =

2026 video game

- Developer: Tambouille
- Publishers: Goblinz Publishing; Maple Whispering
- Designers: Géraud Zucchini; Chariospirale
- Programmer: Géraud Zucchini
- Artist: Chariospirale
- Composer: Antoine Druaux
- Platform: Windows
- Release: Early access 27 May 2025; Full release 10 April 2026
- Genres: Turn-based tactics, roguelike
- Mode: Single-player

Sol Cesto is a 2026 video game developed by Tambouille and published by Goblinz Publishing and Maple Whispering for Windows. It is a turn-based tactics game with roguelike features in which players explore a randomly generated underground world. The game was released in early access on 27 May 2025 and fully released on 10 April 2026.

== Gameplay ==
The objective of the game is to survive whilst descending a subterranean dungeon filled with enemies and traps. The dungeon is represented as a 4x4 grid, with each square containing an enemy, a trap, a strawberry that heals health, and a chest containing an item. Each turn, players must select a row of the grid to travel to, with their character landing on a random tile in that row. When players land on tiles with an enemy, the difference between the strength or magic damage of the enemy, and the strength and magic attributes of the player, determines the outcome. When a player clears five tiles, they can progress to the next floor. Players can use items and upgrades, including those purchased from a shopkeeper. Acquiring teeth changes the odds of landing on certain tiles.

== Reception ==
Describing the early access version of Sol Cesto as featuring a "surprising amount of depth", Chris Pereira of GameSpot praised the game's chance-based gameplay mechanics, progression, and highlighted its "general vibe and air of mystery". Willa Rowe of The A.V. Club commended the game as "almost-perfect", writing that mastering its mechanics would appeal to gamers who found statistics and chance rewarding. Giovanni Colantonio of Polygon wrote the game was an unusual deconstruction of the dungeon-crawler genre unlike anything he had ever played, finding its "risk-reward system" was highly addictive, and praising its artistic style as "remarkable" and both modern and classical in style.
