= Crying Suns =

2019 video game

- Digital storefront banner
- Developer: Alt Shift
- Publisher: Humble Bundle
- Producer: Julien Cotret
- Designer: Vincent Noël
- Artists: Frédéric Lopez; Mathias Baglioni; Uriel "Fog Ryû" Lacroix; Louis-Julien "Skaz" Berthe
- Writers: Julien Cotret; Ian Reiley
- Composer: Aymeric Schwartz
- Engine: Unity
- Platforms: Windows, macOS iOS, Android; Nintendo Switch
- Release: Windows, macOS; 19 September 2019; iOS, Android; 25 June 2020; Nintendo Switch; 27 May 2021
- Genres: Strategy, roguelike
- Mode: Single-player

Crying Suns is a 2019 roguelike strategy video game developed by Montpellier-based developer Alt Shift and published by Humble Bundle. The protagonist, space admiral Ellys Idaho, awakes in a cloning facility decades after the interstellar empire he fought for has collapsed, and travels the empire's galaxy in a battleship in search of answers why. The game is split into six chapters, with three sectors each; Idaho and his crew travel through each sector and its star systems to reach the sector exits while staying ahead of a pursuing threat. During the course of their travels, players battle other battleships in pausable real-time.

A Kickstarter campaign funded game development. Alt Shift designed game play to be reminiscent of FTL: Faster Than Light but on a different scale: rather than commanding a small ship like in FTL, the developers wanted "the player to act like Admiral Adama in Battlestar Galactica", commanding several hundred crew members.

Crying Suns was released in September 2019 for Windows and macOS, in June 2020 for iOS and Android, and May 2021 for the Nintendo Switch. Reviewers praised its story, graphics, and tactical complexity in combat, while some criticized the repetitiveness of random events. Many have compared Crying Suns to FTL: Faster Than Light. The game has made over US$2 million as of February 2021.

== Gameplay ==
Crying Suns is a roguelike strategy video game (Note: Several reviews call Crying Suns a strategy game and a roguelike. One review calls the game a rogue-lite.) set in outer space. The protagonist, space admiral Ellys Idaho, awakes in a cloning facility decades after the interstellar empire he fought for has collapsed, and travels the empire's galaxy in a battleship in search of answers why. The game is split into six chapters, with three sectors each; upgrade progress is reset after each chapter. Idaho and his crew travel through each sector and its star systems to reach the sector exits while staying ahead of a pursuing threat and managing the battleship's fuel. Sectors and star systems are randomly generated; each star system may contain several points of interest like "anomalies" or random events such as interactions with pirates. These encounters either reward or remove scrap, the game's currency, or damage the battleship. Players can upgrade their ship's systems or purchase items at outposts using scrap. Players can also undertake planetary missions using commandos, rewarding them with scrap if successful. At the end of each sector, players fight a boss; beating the final boss of the chapter unlocks a new battleship.

Crying Suns' grid based combat system

During the course of their travels, players battle other battleships in pausable real-time. The goal of the battle is to destroy the opposing ship using fighter squadrons and ship-mounted weapons. Fighter squadrons traverse a hexagonal grid between the two ships, employing a rock-paper-scissors design where fighters are strong against specific types but weak against others. The grid may contain environmental hazards that affect fighter maneuverability, such as asteroid fields or automated turrets. Weapons can target either the ships directly or the battlefield grid. Specific ship sub-systems can be targeted: for example, attacking the weapons system can disable the ship-mounted weapons.

Players can also obtain officers, who serve multiple functions. Officers have different skills which offer alternative options during random encounters; additionally, when assigned to a planetary mission, they can help the expedition avoid dangers and increase the amount of scrap collected. Officers also have abilities that improve or alter combat performance when assigned to a specific ship sub-system.

== Development ==
Crying Suns was developed by the Montpellier-based developer Alt Shift in the game engine Unity and was published by Humble Bundle. Alt Shift was founded in 2010; the game's development was funded through a 2018 crowdfunding campaign on Kickstarter, raising over €72,000. According to founder Frédéric Lopez, the developers wanted to make a "tactical and narrative game with a strong visual identity" with a story inspired by classic hard science fiction. Lopez cited prominent science fiction works and authors like Alejandro Jodorowsky as influences for the game's story, particularly melange from the 1965 novel Dune as inspiration for Crying Suns's "OMNIs", and the 1951 novel Foundation as inspiration for the game's imperial setting. The studio looked to implement FTL: Faster Than Light–style gameplay on a different scale: rather than commanding a small ship like in FTL, the developers wanted "the player to act like Admiral Adama in Battlestar Galactica", commanding several hundred crew members. Describing their approach as "macro" rather than "micro" management, Lopez said Alt Shift designed battles to incorporate several tactical components, like squadron positioning, weapon choice, and auxiliary systems. Different battleships were designed to offer alternate playstyles, focusing on different aspects like squadrons or weapons.

The studio tried to make ethically difficult choices for the player by juxtaposing challenging decisions: Lopez cited an example where Idaho and his crew must decide whether they should keep their ship's resources or donate some to a starving character. The art design of the game centered around 2D pixel art-style graphics that took advantage of 3D rendering techniques like dynamic lighting and atmospheric effects. Lopez credited the game's demo and beta for aiding the game's marketing and providing important community feedback for development. Aymeric Schwartz composed the soundtrack.

The game was released on 19 September 2019 for Windows and macOS, and on 25 June 2020 for iOS and Android. The game received a major content and balancing update named Advanced Tactics on 15 June 2020 for Windows and macOS, and on 29 October 2020 for iOS and Android. A port for the Nintendo Switch was released on 27 May 2021.

In May 2023, Humble Bundle released the final Crying Suns update named Last Orders. This free update added two new factions, new types of battlefield items, 30 events and four new characters.

== Reception ==
Reception

Aggregate scores
Aggregator	Score
Metacritic	PC: 75/100 (Note: Score based on 11 reviews) iOS: 84/100 (Note: Score based on 5 reviews)
OpenCritic	62% recommend

Review scores
Publication	Score
PC Gamer (US)	79/100
Pocket Gamer	4.5/5
TouchArcade	4.5/5

Crying Suns received "generally favorable reviews" according to the review aggregator Metacritic. Fellow review aggregator OpenCritic assessed that the game received strong approval, being recommended by 62% of critics. Reviewers compared the game to FTL: Faster Than Light, (Note: Compared to FTL by PC Gamer, Kotaku, Gamereactor, and the Arkansas Democrat-Gazette) praising its story, (Note: Story reviewed positively by PC Gamer, Kotaku, Pocket Gamer, Gamereactor, and the Arkansas Democrat-Gazette) graphics, and tactical complexity in combat, (Note: Combat reviewed positively by PC Gamer, Pocket Gamer, Gamereactor, and the Arkansas Democrat-Gazette) while some criticized the repetitiveness of random events. Dann Sullivan of Pocket Gamer asserted that the "post-societal" science fiction setting keeps the player engaged throughout the game's chapters, while Kotaku's Ian Walker praised the game's worldbuilding. Steve Messner of PC Gamer claimed that the story used many science fiction tropes but described it as "meticulously thought out and grandiose", opining that the game's focus on an "intimate perspective" made the player feel like part of Idaho's crew. Crying Suns's pixel-art graphics style was also praised: Gamereactor's Mike Holmes considered the overall presentation "stylish" with well-designed characters and user interface, while Messner argued that small details "like the way the bridge and its crew glow with the color of a nearby star, help create a forbidding, unsettling atmosphere." Sullivan asserted that the game was a better experience on mobile due to touchscreen controls and a redesigned user interface.

Crying Suns's combat was well received by critics: Messner and Sullivan both described the battles as tactically complex and offering multiple paths to victory. Messner also complimented the environmental hazards as adding additional complexity to the battlefield. However, he criticized the combat as overly forgiving, arguing that the game was not as difficult as other roguelikes and lacked the genre's "critical sense of uncertainty". Holmes took a neutral stance on the easier difficulty, asserting that it allowed the player to focus more on the game's narrative aspects.

Reception toward the game's event system was varied. Sullivan commended the random encounters for developing the game's world and story, while Walker said the events showed "promise in the ways they allow players to approach situations". Holmes praised some events as having "weighty decisions" but noted that the game occasionally repeated events. Messner praised the events' writing but also considered them repetitive, having seen some events numerous times over a single playthrough; he also noted that some events appeared to always resolve with the same outcome.

Many reviewers noted the influence of FTL: Faster Than Light on Crying Suns, as both games have the player navigate through various solar systems, interact with events, and engage in ship-to-ship combat; Crying Suns was characterized as having a stronger narrative focus than FTL. Writing for the Arkansas Democrat-Gazette, Jason Bennett considered the game an upgrade to FTL both in story and combat, while Holmes recommended the game to anyone who enjoyed FTL. Messner acknowledged the similarities between the two games but argued that Crying Suns failed to replicate FTL's success due to the perceived lack of difficulty and variability. Walker considered the game's variation on FTL's core mechanics "unique" but without enough novelty to "hold [his] attention".

=== Sales ===
In February 2021, Lopez said that the game had over 1 million players and made over US$2 million in sales, with US$1 million in net revenue. Lopez has credited the success of Crying Suns to community and content creator support from its initial launch.
