= Sifu (video game) =

- Developer: Sloclap (Note: Nintendo Switch version co-developed with Artefacts Studio)
- Publishers: Sloclap (Note: Microids published the retail editions.); Kepler Interactive
- Director: Jordan Layani
- Producer: Edward Sananikone
- Programmer: Olivier Gaertner
- Artist: Paul-Émile Boucher
- Composer: Howie Lee
- Engine: Unreal Engine 4
- Platforms: PlayStation 4; PlayStation 5; Windows; Nintendo Switch; Nintendo Switch 2; Xbox One; Xbox Series X/S; Android; iOS
- Release: PS4, PS5, Windows; February 8, 2022; Switch; November 8, 2022; Xbox One / Series X/S; March 28, 2023; iOS, Android; October 12, 2026
- Genre: Beat 'em up
- Mode: Single-player

Sifu is a 2022 beat 'em up game developed by Sloclap and co-published with Kepler Interactive. Set in China, players control the child of a martial arts school's sifu (master) who seeks revenge on those responsible for their father's death. Every time the protagonist is killed, they are resurrected and age up, gaining access to more powerful attacks but reducing their health. When the player character becomes too old, they can die permanently, in which case players must restart the level from the beginning and from the same age as their initial attempt.

Sifu was released for PlayStation 4, PlayStation 5, and Windows on 8 February 2022, for the Nintendo Switch on 8 November 2022, for Xbox One and Xbox Series X/S on 28 March 2023, and for iOS and Android on 12 October 2026. The game received generally positive reviews from critics, with praise for its combat, environments, and story. It sold over 4 million units by May 2025. A television adaptation, Sifu: It Takes a Life, was released on Amazon Prime Video in December 2024.

== Gameplay ==
In this gameplay screenshot, the player character (aged 35) is fighting against an enemy with a bamboo stick.

Sifu is an action beat 'em up game played from a third-person perspective. The game is inspired by Bak Mei kung fu and includes over 150 unique attacks. Basic attack moves can be chained together, though some combos may grant players additional tactical opportunities, such as being able to knock down enemies or stun them. The protagonist and hostile enemy characters have a "structural gauge". When the gauge is filled, the guard of these characters will break and they will become vulnerable to finishing attacks that heal the player more on their defeat. Players can block strikes, though this will gradually fill their gauge. Alternatively, players can evade attacks or parry when an enemy is about to land a blow. A successful parry allows the player to stun the enemy or throw them toward a particular direction.

The game allows players to take advantage of the environment and improvise new attacks or alter their strategy when facing a stronger opponent. For instance, the player may kick an enemy off a ledge, or utilize various objects as makeshift weapons. Occasionally, an enemy in a level section may sometimes counter the player's finishing attack, becoming enraged and more powerful. Occasionally, the player may be presented with dialogue options, which can enable them to potentially avoid combat altogether depending on their choice of words.

When the player character dies, they are resurrected by a pendant at the spot where they die and age several years. As they age, their attacks will be more powerful, but they will have less health. Eventually, it will no longer be possible to revive due to the pendant breaking, and the next death will end the game. Players will encounter shrines, which allows them to heal and unlock skills. They can visit the "Wuguan", a Kung Fu school, to practice their skills in between levels. Abilities are lost when the player character dies, though it is possible to permanently unlock upgrades so that they are available at the beginning of each run. As the player completes multiple runs, they can access the "detective board", where the information collected across different runs will be stored, and secret areas and shortcuts may open up.

== Plot ==
On a rainy night, Yang, a disgraced student of a martial arts school in China, leads a raid on his former school along with four other martial artists of the Dawn Group: Fajar "The Botanist", a ferocious, mute middle-aged man who wields a machete; Sean "The Fighter", an arrogant young man who wields a staff; Kuroki "The Artist", a young Japanese woman who wields a bladed three-section staff; and Jinfeng "The CEO", an elderly, one-armed woman who wields a rope dart. After defeating the students, Yang confronts the school's sifu, his former master, and strikes him in the chest, causing him to suffer a fatal heart attack. While searching through his belongings, Yang finds the sifu's only child hiding nearby and orders Fajar to slit their throat. The child wakes up to find their throat healed, thanks to an ancient pendant in their hand, which can revive the dead but exponentially increases their age with each resurrection until it breaks from overuse.

Vowing revenge on the Dawn Group, the child spends the next eight years living in isolation, training relentlessly and gathering information on their targets. As a young adult, the sifu's child, now a talented but inexperienced martial artist, begins their quest for revenge, tracking down the members of the Dawn Group. Each member wields a talisman that grants elemental powers, taken on the night of the raid. Yang and the others believed these powers should have been shared, but over time became corrupted by them and eventually began using them for their own selfish gain.

After clearing out the respective areas leading to each accomplice's domain, the martial artist fights and kills each member of the Dawn Group: Fajar, who now works for a gang of drug traffickers in the slums and possesses the Wood talisman, granting him control over plants; Sean, who runs an underground fight club and a brutal martial arts school, where he encourages students to fight for supremacy and permanently scars them with his Fire talisman; Kuroki, who runs an art gallery as a front for organized crime and can create surreal arenas from her own artwork using her Water talisman; and Jinfeng, who has become a wealthy but corrupt businesswoman in the city's largest tower, wielding the Metal talisman.

Eventually, the martial artist goes after Yang, confronting him at his private sanctuary, where Yang reveals his Earth talisman can bring back the dead. After a fierce fight, Yang attempts to disarm the martial artist of the pendant, but the latter deflects the attack and strikes Yang in the chest, killing him the same way he did their father. Afterwards, the martial artist experiences a vision of two graves next to a tree and learns that Yang tried to steal the Earth talisman to save his dying wife and daughter, but was stopped by the sifu, who declared that Yang had lost his worthiness by dishonoring his oath and expelled him from the school. The pendant tells the martial artist of the importance of Wude (the morality of martial arts) and sends them back in time with this knowledge, to the beginning of their quest.

At this point, the player can fight each member of the Dawn Group again, but now they have the option of sparing their opponents after defeating them. Being shown mercy by the martial artist, the Dawn Group members have their fighting spirits broken and willingly renounce their talismans. The game features two possible endings, depending on the player's actions:

- If the martial artist kills any of the targets, they will again be sent back in time by the pendant and be forced to re-enact their fights in an endless loop until they learn Wude.
- If the martial artist spares all of the targets, they adhere to the principles of Wude and allow Yang to take away the pendant and kill them during the final fight. Yang then sees the two graves in his own vision as the martial artist is temporarily resurrected to finish the fight by the tree, now in the real world. After defeating Yang, the martial artist succumbs to their injuries; however, because they adhered to Wude, they finally attain enlightenment. A post-credits scene shows the martial artist, now a sifu in their own right, training new students at their father's former school, implying they were somehow resurrected (possibly by the pendant for mastering Wude, or by Yang to seek redemption for his sins).

== Development and release ==
Sifu was developed by French studio Sloclap, who previously released their debut fighting game Absolver in 2017. Unlike Absolver, the game does not have multiplayer as the team wanted to focus on developing the gameplay and avoid wasting time developing the infrastructure necessary for online gaming. The combat was inspired by 1970s and 1980s kung fu movies starring Jackie Chan, which usually featured Chan's signature quick-paced fight choreography against large groups of enemies. The term "sifu" (Chinese: 師父) refers to "master" in Cantonese, and the Bak Mei style was used as the basis for the game's combat. The team worked with Benjamin Colussi, a Bak Mei kung fu master to choreograph the fights and the main character's movements. The game emphasizes "mastery through practice", a key value of kung fu which is reflected through the aging system. The game was designed to be difficult and features a sharp learning curve, as the team felt that players would not gain a feeling of mastery if the gameplay experience is too easy.

Sloclap announced Sifu in February 2021 during Sony's State of Play livestream. The team initially planned to release the game in 2021, but it was delayed to the following year to further polish the game and avoid overworking the team. Sifu was released on 8 February 2022 for Windows via the Epic Games Store, PlayStation 4 and PlayStation 5, with players who purchase the Deluxe Edition having access the game 48 hours earlier, and receive a digital art book and the original soundtrack composed by Howie Lee. A retail edition of the game, titled Sifu: Vengeance Edition, was released by publisher Microids on 3 May 2022.

Sloclap announced a series of content updates in April 2022, the first being new outfits, an advanced training mode and difficulty options such as an easy mode called "Student" where enemies are more forgiving and the ageing mechanic is significantly downplayed, and a hard mode, referred to ingame as "Master", giving players a challenge far more punishing than the original difficulty setting, which still remains in the game as "Disciple". A bonus outfit for owners of the Deluxe Edition called "Young Man"–made as a homage to the 2003 South Korean neo-noir action film Oldboy–was also released.

On 31 August 2022, Sloclap released a free update which added outfits and a scoring system. It introduced gameplay modifiers such as infinite health and unbreakable weapons.

== Reception ==
=== Critical reception ===
Reception

Aggregate score
Aggregator	Score
Metacritic	PC: 79/100; PS4: 71/100; PS5: 81/100; NS: 81/100

Review scores
Publication	Score
Destructoid	9/10
Game Informer	7.25/10
GameSpot	9/10
GamesRadar+	4.5/5
Hardcore Gamer	3/5
IGN	9/10
Nintendo Life	8/10
PC Gamer (US)	85/100
PCMag	4/5
Push Square	8/10
Shacknews	4/10
The Guardian	3/5
Video Games Chronicle	4/5
GamerSky	8.5/10

Sifu received "generally favorable" reviews from critics for most platforms, except for the PS4 version which received "mixed or average" reviews, according to review aggregator website Metacritic.

IGN called the game "utterly uncompromising in its design", praising the narrative, combat, controller haptics, environments, AI, structure, and expressed minor issues with the camera. Destructoid called it "a constant uphill battle" and "intensely rewarding", concluding, "Sifu is a challenge worth taking on and overcoming. It's a story of vengeance with a little heart at the end, and though it might not land perfectly, it's got a lot of style and action to back it up." Game Informer's review was slightly less positive about the game's structure, praising its combat for coming out of the gate strong while stating that the game eventually became a tiresome grind. GameSpot heavily lauded the game's two modes of combat, stating that they were impactful, and also praised the inventive aging mechanic and lack of a repetitive feel due to dynamic fights. The bad camera, bland story and characters, and superfluous investigative elements received some criticism. GamesRadar+ wrote positively about the game, praising its learning curve, aesthetics, and replayability, while taking some issue with the short length and limited enemy variety. Push Square gave the game eight stars out of ten, similarly praising its combat, rewarding feel, presentation, art direction, level design, and soundtrack, while criticizing the occasional unfairness in trial-and-error gameplay and its wonky camera. GamerSky, a Chinese publication, was positive about the game, stating that it meets the expectations of a kungfu film especially in terms of action performance and scene atmosphere, but noted that the game is worthy of its title Sifu in terms of its strict difficulty.

Blake Morse from Shacknews gave the game a negative review. He criticised the game's upgrade system and its roguelike structure, which forces players to grind for an extended period of time and replay levels frequently in order to progress.

=== Sales ===
Sifu sold over 500,000 units within 48 hours of its release. The game sold over 1 million units by March 2022 and over 3 million units by February 2024. As of May 2025, the game sold over 4 million copies.

=== Accolades ===
Awards and nominations for Sifu
Year	Award	Category	Result	Ref.
2022	Golden Joystick Awards	PlayStation Game of the Year	Nominated	
2022	The Game Awards	Best Independent Game	Nominated	
2022	The Game Awards	Best Action Game	Nominated	
2022	The Game Awards	Best Fighting Game	Nominated	
2023	D.I.C.E. Awards	Action Game of the Year	Nominated	
2023	British Academy Games Awards	Animation	Nominated	
2023	British Academy Games Awards	Original Property	Nominated	
2023	Steam Awards	Best Game You Suck At	Won	

== Adaptations ==
=== Film ===
In December 2022, Story Kitchen announced a partnership with developer Sloclap to make a live-action feature film adaptation of Sifu.

By February 2025, Netflix gained the rights for the film, with 87Eleven Entertainment joining Sloclap and Story Kitchen in its production, and T. S. Nowlin as screenwriter. Dmitri M. Johnson and Michael Lawrence Goldberg of Story Kitchen are executive producing along with Timothy I. Stevenson and Elena Sandoval. Chad Stahelski & Jason Spitz will produce for 87Eleven

=== Television ===
In August 2024, it was revealed that the game would be adapted as an episode of the video game anthology television series Secret Level, created by Tim Miller for Amazon Prime Video. The episode, Sifu: It Takes a Life, written by Rich Larson, directed by László Ruska, animated by Digic Pictures and starring the voices of Parry Shen, Ping Wu, Lydia Look, Nelson Lee, Feodor Chin, and Rae Lim, was released on December 10, 2024.
