= The Wreck (video game) =

2023 video game

- Developer: The Pixel Hunt
- Publisher: The Pixel Hunt
- Engine: Unity
- Platforms: Nintendo Switch; PlayStation 4; PlayStation 5; Windows; Xbox One; Xbox Series X/S; iOS; Android
- Release: Consoles & PC; WW: March 14, 2023; Mobile; WW: October 3, 2023
- Genre: Narrative adventure
- Mode: Single-player

The Wreck is a 2023 narrative adventure game by The Pixel Hunt. Players control a woman who attempts to process the events of a traumatic day while experiencing a repeating car wreck.

== Gameplay ==
After Junon's estranged mother, Marie, suffers an aneurysm, Junon discovers that Marie forged her signature and made Junon her healthcare proxy. As Junon discusses these emotional issues with her family and doctor, players can learn more about Junon's thoughts by clicking on words that represent Junon's inner dialogue. Whenever Junon becomes emotionally overwhelmed during a conversation, she drives off in her car and gets into an accident; this same accident repeats throughout the game like a time loop that she is caught in. During the crash, objects fly loose and trigger interactive memories. Once Junon has processed these memories, she can repeat the difficult conversation and make better choices.

== Development ==
The Pixel Hunt, a French video game studio based in Paris, based the premise of The Wreck on the anxieties their founder felt after a car accident that involved his daughter. They released it for Windows, PlayStation 4 and 5, Xbox One and Series X/S, and Switch on March 14, 2023. The iOS and Android versions were released on October 3, 2023, and are free-to-play with in-app purchases.

== Reception ==
Rock Paper Shotgun designated The Wreck as one of their favorite games of the year and called it "a wonderfully sensitive examination of grief, family, toxic relationships and personal discovery". GamesRadar recommended it to fans of video games with a strong narrative and said it left them with "a lasting impression". A month after its release on Steam, it sold about a thousand copies, and it sold another thousand on other platforms.

It was nominated for excellence in narrative at the 2024 Independent Games Festival.

It won the Apple Design Award for Social Impact and the App Store Award for Cultural Impact in 2024.
