= Flat Eye =

2022 video game

- Developer: Monkey Moon
- Publisher: Raw Fury
- Engine: Unity
- Platforms: macOS; Windows
- Release: WW: November 14, 2022
- Genre: Business simulation
- Mode: Single-player

Flat Eye is a 2022 business simulation game developed by Monkey Moon and published by Raw Fury. Players manage a gas station in a dystopian version of Iceland.

== Gameplay ==
Players manage an Icelandic gas station that is part of the fictional Flat Eye conglomerate. A single employee handles all the tasks in the gas station. As players make more money, they can install technologically advanced devices and services to exploit their customers, such as an AI-powered self-help booth that sells customers' personal data. Devices can interact with each other, such as a smart toilet that covertly sends information about customers' health to the self-help booth. The employee is responsible for upkeep of the devices, which frequently break down. These repairs can injure or kill the employee, after which players can hire a replacement. Players must also manage the energy needs of their devices. Special customers, with whom players can interact, occasionally enter the store and discuss the dystopian state of world affairs. Players must meet quotas to pass Flat Eye's performance reviews.

== Development ==
Monkey Moon was inspired by Theme Hospital and Dungeon Keeper. Setting Flat Eye in a gas station came from a desire to let players meet a wide variety of people from different backgrounds. The developers' also drew from their experiences in working in retail. The management elements were designed to focus more on fun than complexity, as Monkey Moon felt that modern simulation games had become too complex. Although players are given quotas and their efficiency is summarized using graphs, Flat Eye was designed to not have a game over state. Raw Fury released Flat Eye for Windows and macOS on November 14, 2022.

== Reception ==
Reception

Aggregate scores
Aggregator	Score
Metacritic	74/100
OpenCritic	75% recommend

Review score
Publication	Score
PC Gamer (US)	70/100

Flat Eye received "mixed or average" reviews from critics, according to the review aggregation website Metacritic. Fellow review aggregator OpenCritic assessed that the game received strong approval, being recommended by 75% of critics. Although PC Gamer felt it did not live up to its potential, they said it was still interesting for its focus on showing the negative traits of capitalism that are usually glossed over by other business simulation games. However, they disliked how unsubtle some of the anti-capitalist sentiment is. Rock Paper Shotgun praised the narrative elements and called Flay Eye a "compelling and thoughtful exploration" of the negative aspects of capitalism. Hardcore Gamer, who praised the dialogue and satire, called it "a sweet and savvy twist on simulation games".
