= Night Call (video game) =

2019 video game

- Developers: MonkeyMoon, Black Muffin
- Publisher: Raw Fury
- Producer: Laurent Victorino
- Designer: Anthony Jauneaud
- Programmers: Damien Mayance; Laurent Victorino; Daniele Giardini
- Artists: Mathieu Collangettes; Sandra Fesquet
- Writer: Anthony Jauneaud
- Composer: Corentin Brasart
- Engine: Unity Engine
- Platforms: macOS; Windows; Xbox One; Nintendo Switch
- Release: PC: WW: July 17, 2019; Nintendo Switch, Xbox One: WW: June 24, 2020
- Mode: Single-player

Night Call is a 2019 noir-inspired adventure video game, co-developed by MonkeyMoon and Black Muffin, and published by Raw Fury. It was released worldwide on July 17, 2019, for PC platforms, and on June 24, 2020, for Xbox One and the Nintendo Switch. In Night Call, player assumes the role of a Parisian taxi driver who survived the actions of a serial killer, and is compelled to solve a murder mystery following his awakening from a coma. Aside from pursuing interactions with the driver's passengers as the conceit behind the investigation, the gameplay of Night Call also incorporates aspects of a management simulator, which reflects Houssine's need to make a living as a taxi driver.

Night Call received mixed reviews from critics. The game has been praised for its setting, characters and plot, while criticism focused on the repetitive nature of its gameplay design and aspects of its conversation system.

== Gameplay ==
Night Call is set in Paris, the capital city of France. Night Call's visual style - low-key, black-and-white - is typical of the film noir genre. The player may choose to play one of three versions of the same story outline, all of which follow a taxi driver named Houssine who wakes up from medically induced coma in a hospital after surviving an attack by a notorious serial killer two weeks before. A police officer blackmails Houssine to investigate his own case by leveraging his interactions with his passengers to track down the serial killer.

The gameplay of Night Call has been described as a combination of a murder mystery adventure game and a "night gig economy simulator". Each night, players would drive around Paris as Houssine. From the in-game map, players would select a fare to accept and watch a yellow arrow navigate to its destination. Upon arrival, an overlaying scene of an interior shot of the car with Houssine front right and his passenger(s) in the back seat will play. Conversations are text-based and takes place between minimally animated character models, with players selecting dialogue options on Houssine's behalf, which is occasionally interspersed with his internal observations. Night Call features a “Passidex” that compiles every character the player meets along with important information about their interactions with Houssine, which players may reference when trying to deduce the identity of the serial killer. In total, there are 75 passengers whom Houssine may meet encounter the course of the game.

In between passenger fares, players may visit various locations to further Houssine's investigation by tracking down leads and following up on clues. Players must be mindful of the amount of fuel left in the car's tank during Houssine's travels, which is funded with proceeds from cab fares. Night Call offers three levels of difficulty: in the easiest difficulty or story mode, resource management and case investigation is adjusted to be easier, whereas in hard mode, money is harder to come by and the difficulty in terms of investigation is greatly increased.

== Development and release ==
The development team of Night Call, led by project leader Laurent Victorino and writer Anthony Jauneaud, started planning for the game in 2016 and began working seriously with their publisher Raw Fury by 2017. An important influence for Night Call is the 2011 video game L.A. Noire. The developers decided at the beginning of development that the protagonist is not a competent detective like Sherlock Holmes, or a superhero who specializes in crime fighting. The developers wanted to emphasize his limited skills as a taxi driver and his relatability as an ordinary person who is thrust into an extraordinary situation. In this regard, money earned from taxi fares and managing gasoline levels are incorporated as gameplay mechanics, in an effort to challenge players to make appropriate decisions within the required timeframe. The pacing of Night Call is planned in such a way that players may enjoy it in short bursts and play between 10 and 15 minutes, with a single in-game night session lasting between half an hour to 45 minutes. The developers compared the gameplay experience to a "cool book" that players would want to return to each night.

The in-game map in Night Call is based on the real life layout of Paris, which measures 100 square kilometres in length. The cast of characters in Night Call are not just confined to French nationals; the cosmopolitan makeup of Paris and its reputation as one of the most visited destinations in the world in terms of international tourist arrivals inspired the team to incorporate non-French nationals as potential characters the player may encounter during shifts. The developers have described the tone of Night Call to be distinctly "French", and that it does have a sense of humor in spite of its generally dark atmosphere.

Night Call was released for Windows and macOS on July 17, 2019. Console ports for Xbox One and the Nintendo Switch were released on June 24, 2020. A port for PlayStation 4 was originally planned, but was officially canceled as of October 2020. The developers cited disappointing sales on other platforms and unspecified issues with their porting partners as the reasons behind the cancellation.

== Reception ==
Reception

Aggregate score
Aggregator	Score
Metacritic	(PC) 68/100 (NS) 66/100 (XONE) 65/100

Review scores
Publication	Score
Adventure Gamers	5/10
GameSpot	8/10
IGN	6/10
Jeuxvideo.com	5.5/10
Nintendo World Report	5.5/10
PC Gamer (US)	6.5/10
Shacknews	7/10

According to the review aggregator Metacritic, Night Call has received mixed reviews across all released platforms.

David Wildgoose from GameSpot gave a positive review of the game. He praised the strong writing, which delivers moving and memorable scenes; Houssine as a protagonist, "who is full of surprising strengths and vulnerabilities"; and the "diverse and well-rounded" cast of characters. He felt that its minimal presentation suits the noir atmosphere conveyed by Night Call, although the frequent juggling of fares is detrimental to the enjoyable narrative. In his view, "Night Call's real strength is in the stories it tells about Paris, about the people who live there and the meaningful connections you can have with them no matter how brief or unexpected. It's these people you'll remember once you've solved each case, not the fares you charged them". Donovan Erskine from Shacknews said Night Call sets itself up with an inspired idea and premise. He expressed fascination at the concept of Houssine, who living the simple life as a city taxi driver going through regular life while trying to catch a sinister serial killer, and the unraveling of the central mystery once the game's different systems begin "firing on all cylinders". On the other hand, Erskine found that "the cabbie sim gameplay gets boring and the gameplay loop grows repetitive quickly".

Malindy Hetfeld from PC Gamer felt that the game's "strong mood and hints of brilliance" could not overcome its "haphazard gameplay and varying narrative quality". IGN Italia liked the atmosphere and felt its gameplay mechanics had promise, but identified issues with the game's general pacing and said the management simulation aspects was poorly implemented. Jeux Video said Night Call is closer to an interactive novel rather than investigation game, noting that it never lived up to its potential in spite of its atmosphere and writing. Evan Dickens from Adventure Gamers concluded that Night Call is a unique visual novel-style adventure which is neither "a great mystery nor a great cabbie simulator", but suggested that some players may find its dialogue and "weird characters" an "interesting distraction".

In her review of the game's Nintendo Switch port, which was released a year after the original PC version, Melanie Zawodniak concurred with the assessments of the game's weaknesses made by other critics. She called the game's mystery investigation elements "half-baked", and felt that Night Call is ultimately missing a crucial element to tie its disparate elements together. Zawodniak suggested that Night Call would have been a better game if the player character is simply driving around Paris and getting acquainted with his passengers without the conceit of the serial killer investigation, as she liked the game's cast of characters but was frustrated with the fact that their stories could not be carried forward into future cases, or that she had to go through repetitively generated material just to see through the conclusion of the individual characters' story arcs.
