= Save Me Mr Tako =

2018 video game

Save Me Mr Tako: Tasukete Tako-San
- Save Me Mr Tako: Definitive Edition cover artwork
- Developer: Deneos Games
- Publishers: Nicalis (Note: The publishing agreement was terminated in 2020; all assets produced by Nicalis are absent from subsequent editions of the game.); Deneos Games; Limited Run Games
- Designer: Christophe Galati
- Programmer: Christophe Galati
- Composer: Marc‑Antoine Archier
- Engine: Unity
- Platforms: Windows; Nintendo Switch; PlayStation 4
- Release: Tasukete Tako-San; Windows; WW: October 30, 2018; Nintendo Switch; WW: October 30, 2018; Definitive Edition; Windows; WW: May 5, 2021; Nintendo Switch; WW: May 5, 2021; PlayStation 4; WW: May 3, 2024
- Genres: Platform, Action role-playing
- Mode: Single-player

Save Me Mr Tako: Tasukete Tako-San (Note: Japanese: 助けてタコさん) (stylized as Save me Mr Tako: Tasukete Tako-San) is a 2018 platform action role-playing game developed and published by Deneos Games. Designer Christophe Galati began developing the game while he was enrolled at a game design school in 2014 at the age of nineteen, drawing inspiration from Game Boy titles. The game was released by publisher Nicalis for Microsoft Windows & Nintendo Switch in 2018. In 2020, Deneos and Nicalis ended their agreement, reverting the rights back to Deneos. It was re-released as Save Me Mr Tako: Definitive Edition on May 5, 2021, on Steam by Deneos and for Switch by Limited Run Games. The game was released on PlayStation 4 by Limited Run Games on May 3, 2024.

A sequel, Tako no Himitsu: Ocean of Secrets, is tentatively scheduled for a 2026 release.

== Gameplay ==
Save Me Mr Tako is a side-scrolling video game, featuring action role-playing elements. The player controls one octopus or human character at a time, dictated by the stage of the narrative they are at. The character may run & jump, while also employing a clamber ability that automatically activates near a ledge, allowing for the character to scale hard-to-reach surfaces. While playing as Tako, the player may shoot a non-lethal ink projectile that stuns enemies. Tako & Azuria have access to hats, which grant special abilities while worn. The fifty-plus hats in-game may be acquired while completing levels or by purchase at shops. While playing as the other characters, the player has limited versatility, with their abilities confined to preset moves and attacks, such as sword strikes. The hats act as a damage buffer for Tako; when struck, he loses his hat while his personal health is left intact. While Tako dies immediately when struck while unprotected in the original release, he has a limited life bar in the Definitive Edition.

The player navigates by visiting an overworld map that allows them to visit different levels. As the story progresses, the levels change, encouraging the player to revisit them. Every individual level is depicted from a side-scroller perspective, with a starting point. The character has a default three lives - when they die with ones to spare, they resurrect at the last checkpoint; if they die with none left, they must restart the entire level.

== Synopsis ==
=== Setting and characters ===
Save Me Mr Tako takes place in a fictional world contested by humans and intelligent anthropomorphic octopuses. After creating the world, God slumbered and left it in the care of fairies. Failing to cooperate, the fairies forged a blade that they used to bisect God, but the pieces were uneven, leaving the world dysfunctional. The fairies founded the World Order, a system that would pass rule between them, while sealing the remains of the god with amulets and a sacred song - mortals would be able to harness this power, if the world were threatened.

Octopuses were the world's dominant species men. Humanity is divided into three nations: the fisherman state of Belys, governed by the Mayor; the militant & religious state of Sarona, ruled by the King and his children, Princess Mireille & Prince Evan; and the artistic state of Ydor, ruled by the Queen and her son, Prince Pol. While Belys has remained neutral, Sarona & Ydor have been locked in war for several decades. The octopus fairy, Lalabichoua, met the ambitious octopus leader, Bako, who sought solutions to the humans' conflict. Lalabichoua fell in love with Bako and gifted him with the power to breathe out of water, in the hopes that he could broker peace between Sarona & Ydor. Instead, the King of Sarona, representing humanity's general sentiment, regarded the octopuses as monsters and killed Bako's comrades, incurring his wrath and bringing the octopuses into the war.

=== Plot ===
Mireille is aboard a ship when it is attacked by octopuses who throw her overboard. Among the octopuses' ranks is Tako, who leaps overboard and saves Mireille, to the chagrin of his brother, Bako. The octopuses form an alliance with Ydor, to mount a campaign against Sarona. That night, Tako is visited by Lalabichoua, who blesses him with the ability to breathe out of water, in exchange for pacifism with humans. On the trail of his brother, Tako arrives at Belys, whose children have been abducted by octopuses. Tako saves the mayor's son, earning the locals' trust. The human fairy, Eos, reveals herself and attempts to dissuade Tako from remaining on land, declaring it "futile". Evan introduces himself to Tako, jaded by his father killing his boyfriend to defeminate him. Tako & Evan reach Sarona, besieged by the join Ydor & octopus army. After the King of Sarona dies in Evan's arms, Tako duels Bako, only for the octopus general, Sako, to remove him from the castle. With the King deposed of, Bako succeeds him as the ruler of Sarona.

Evan directs Tako to rally a resistance in Ydor while he searches for Mireille, who has been sent on a quest to restore an amulet by Eos on Alpha Island. After encountering a dark magic-casting child named Enkidd, Tako arrives at Ydor, where he is imprisoned by the distrustful Queen. Tako escapes and, along with Enkidd, impress the royalty into an invitation to an opera performance by the singer Lucia. The theater is attacked by octopuses who abduct Lucia and Pol. Tako & Enkidd are tasked with rescuing the kidnapped children, but become irritated with one another along the way. At the request of the Queen, Enkidd begins to raise an army of shadow warriors - the exertion of dark magic corrupts him and he ambushes Mireille when she restores her amulet. With the help of the octopus princess, Azuria, Tako rescues the last of the children from Sako. Enkidd makes his corruption known, riding the Goddess with her powers harnessed. He kills Evan and destroys the octopus village. Mireille saves Tako and steals back the amulet from Enkidd. Overcome with hatred for humans, Tako is confronted by Lalabichoua who holds him to promise and kills him.

The world is devastated, with the octopus castle lying in ruins. Azuria discovers an amulet that she and Bako approach Lalabichoua with - the fairy tells them it must be restored by singing a song at the Temple in Belys, Ydor and Alpha Island. Sophia, the designated saint of the Church of Sarona, is introduced to Azuria by Eos and leads the octopus princess to the Belys Temple, where the amulet is partially restored. Octopus soldiers are routed in Ydor, to prevent a counterattack. Azuria is introduced to a new resistance headed by Pol and constituting the children Tako rescued. The resistance leads Azuria toward the Great Temple - along the way, she encounters a remorseful Enkidd who she motivates to reform. Azuria finds Mireille locked in the Great Temple, where the pair restore another portion of the amulet, on the pretense of resurrecting the Octopus God, the Kraken, to heal the world. Lucia's singing voice is needed for accessing Alpha Island, but she refuses to help Azuria unless Sako apologizes for the attack. Sako reluctantly meets with her and atones for his part in the war. With Lucia's help, Azuria accesses the temple on Alpha Island and restores the last piece of the amulet to resurrect the kraken. Azuria's party is besieged by Bako's forces who steal the amulet, with the kraken & Lalabichoua in tow.

Eos resurrects Tako, inspired by his belief in peace and guilt from empowering Enkidd. She leads Tako to the World Order Seal, where the fairies decide to entrust him with restoring the world. Tako is directed to a lighthouse where to be granted one wish - a spirit guides him through, making him reflect on his life and battle the embodiment of death. The spirit reveals himself to be Evan, who says goodbye and brings Tako to the earth for a final battle against the gods. Mireille sways Bako to abandon his conquest. Everyone joins and sings the prophecy song, which fuses the gods and amulets together into the Sword of Fairies. The embodiment of Hate manifests, born from all the characters' hatred, consumes Mireille, Bako, Enkidd and Tako, then possesses the Essence of God. Azuria wields the Sword of Fairies and pursues God into the void, where she battles it and frees the characters by forcing them to face their inner demons. Hate is expelled from God's corpse and reaches the World Order Seal, becoming one with the world and recreating the amulets. Tako battles the world, empowered by the hope of its peoples, which he uses to summon the Sword of Hope and defeat it. Tako refuses to ascend to godhood, allowing the Essence of God to be absorbed by the world. Eos & Lalabichoua bid Tako farewell, acknowledging him as the master of his own fate.

== Development ==
While a student enrolled at a game design school in 2014, French designer Christophe Galati began developing a video game passion project inspired by Game Boy aesthetics and titles from its era, including The Legend of Zelda: Link’s Awakening, Kirby's Dream Land 2, Metroid II: Return of Samus, Final Fantasy Adventure and Kaeru no Tame ni Kane wa Naru. Inspired by his introduction to takoyaki, a Japanese snack made from octopus, Galati refined the game to be a platformer featuring an auto-running control scheme and an octopus wielding a sword as the playable character. After receiving praise for his initial demo, Galati committed to developing the project further. The game's artwork was developed in 8-bit color, emulating the Game Boy's aesthetic. Save Me Mr Tako was initially intended to be released for Steam & the Wii U, but following the unveiling of the Nintendo Switch, Wii U compatibility for mobile play was abandoned, in favor of the Switch version. Galati claimed the tone of the game's narrative shifted in the wake of the November 2015 Paris attacks, with themes of obscurantism and unity being accentuated.

A fan of several of their games, Galati corresponded with publisher Nicalis throughout the early stages of development, receiving feedback on the aspects of the game's builds. Galati met Nicalis employees in person while presenting Save Me Mr Tako at the Tokyo Game Show in 2016. In May 2017, Nicalis signed a deal with Galati, acquiring the rights to the game. The following August, Nicalis announced the forthcoming release of the game with a teaser trailer. Galati subsequently resigned from his day job and committed to working full-time on Save Me Mr Tako for the remainder of its development. Nicalis provided support for asset creation, including Japanese localization.

Following the initial release of Save Me Mr Tako: Tasukete Tako-San in 2018, the game received no patches from Nicalis for the subsequent two years. In early 2019, Galati enrolled as the first game designer at Villa Kujoyama, a French residency in Kyoto, Japan, where he began work on the sequel, Tako no Himitsu: Ocean of Secrets, while improving Save Me Mr Tako for future builds. In 2020, Deneos and Nicalis signed an agreement to terminate their publishing arrangement, removing the game from digital storefronts and reverting the rights back to Deneos. The termination stipulated that assets developed by Nicalis could not be utilized further, leaving the build without its translations. In April 2021, Galati announced Save Me Mr Tako: Definitive Edition for release the subsequent month. The changes would include improvements to physics, camera motion, the hat & ink systems, level design, enemy A.I., UI elements, as well as new difficulty modes, a hint system, visual options and localization.

== Release ==
Nicalis released Save Me Mr Tako as a digital download for Windows via Steam and for Nintendo Switch via the Nintendo eShop on October 30, 2018. Galati desired a physical release for the game, as well as publishing content updates, which Nicalis did not oblige to. Revealed in an in-depth article written by Kotaku editor Jason Schreier exposing exploitative & abusive behaviors by Tyrone Rodriguez, Nicalis' chief executive officer, patches submitted by Deneos were ignored by the company. In October 2020, Deneos and Nicalis ended their relationship, resulting in Save Me Mr Tako to be removed from all digital storefronts.

On May 5, 2021, the Definitive Edition was released for Steam by Deneos and for Switch by Limited Run Games. Japanese localization was initially incomplete, with only kana characters used for the first year. For the first anniversary, Limited Run Games released an update including kanji characters, as well as a new physical edition of Save Me Mr Tako for Switch, with a Tako plushie bundle. Limited Run Games ported Save Me Mr Tako: Definitive Edition to PlayStation 4 as both a digital download and limited physical release on May 3, 2024.

== Sequel ==
While in residency at Villa Kujoyama in 2019, Galati began work on a successor to Save Me Mr Tako code-named "Himitsu Project". Inspired by role-playing games from the Game Boy Advance era, it would feature the same world six hundred years later, with a cast of characters from an overhead perspective. After four years of development, Deneos formally announced Tako no Himitsu: Ocean of Secrets in 2023. The game's Kickstarter campaign went live on July 10, 2024, and was fully funded within three days, with a tentative 2026 release window.
