= Dordogne (video game) =

2023 video game

- Developers: Un Je Ne Sais Quoi; Umanimation
- Publisher: Focus Entertainment
- Engine: Unity
- Platforms: Nintendo Switch; PlayStation 4; PlayStation 5; Windows; Xbox One; Xbox Series X/S
- Release: June 13, 2023
- Genre: Adventure
- Mode: Single-player

Dordogne is an adventure video game developed by Un Je Ne Sais Quoi and Umanimation and published by Focus Entertainment. The player completes puzzles to help a woman recall her past. It released for Nintendo Switch, PlayStation 4, PlayStation 5, Windows, Xbox One, and Xbox Series X/S in June 2023.

== Gameplay ==
The player controls a woman named Mimi who, in 2002, travels to Dordogne after her grandmother Nora's death. There, she attempts to recall her childhood. This is done through puzzles and minigames as Mimi relives her experiences with Nora as a preteen in the 1980s. The player can update Mimi's holiday scrapbook with mementos. The art style resembles watercolor paintings.

== Development ==
The game was released for the Nintendo Switch, PlayStation 4, PlayStation 5, Windows, Xbox One, and Xbox Series X/S on June 13, 2023.

== Reception ==
On Metacritic, Dordogne received positive reviews for Windows and PlayStation 4, and the Switch version received mixed reviews. Game Informer said it is "like a charming French indie art film come to life". Rock Paper Shotgun said the puzzles are simple, but it is "a very sweet and tender coming of age tale". Though they were disappointed by the narrative, Slant Magazine praised the art. Nintendo Life enjoyed the storytelling and the game's "poetic expression", but they found some of the gameplay and performance on the Switch to be frustrating.
