= Video games in France =

Video gaming in France is one of the largest markets in Europe. The French government gives special tax breaks to video game companies. In 2014, the French diplomatic service released a report which calculates the profit generated by the French video game industry at €2.7 billion. It states that there are 300 video game companies in France. It estimates the number of jobs directly related to the video game industry at 5,000. It estimates the number of indirect jobs created by the video game industry at 10,000. The report found that in 2013, around 8 out of 10 people had played a video game in the last 12 months. In 2018, the number of players was estimated at 32.8 million.

In France video games have equal status as an artform, alongside more traditional formats, such as painting and theatre. In 2016, the French Minister of State for Digital Affairs, Axelle Lemaire, held talks with various French video game industry figureheads to find solutions to the problem of misogyny in video games. She mooted solutions like removing tax credits for publishers who publish games with misogynistic content, and creating a label which would identify video games with positive representations of women.

== History ==
In 2019 there were a total of 1,130 gaming companies based in France. In 2002, the explosion of the Internet bubble provoked the end of three of the most prestigious French studios in a few months: Kalisto Entertainment, No Cliché and Lankhor. Between 2003 and 2013, the video game industry in France plunged more than 80% to 240 companies and 4,800 employees, moving from fifth to seventh in the world. Since the crash, companies in the sector struggle to develop beyond a certain size, with the majority of studios focusing on virtual platform development. Based on 2021 revenue estimates, France is the 7th largest video game market with an estimated amount of 38.08 million active consumers. In comparison, the United Kingdom accounts for approximately 37.66 million active consumers and Germany approximately 46.12 million. Despite these economic constraints, in the 2010s, French studios signed more and more contracts with international producers such as Capcom and Sega. Although French touch is no longer regarded as a guarantee of creativity, many French studios, such as Eugen Systems, Cyanide and Ankama, remain internationally respected developers in the field of simulation.

== Market ==
=== Revenue ===
In 2021, the French video game industry generated €5.65 billion in revenue, a record high. Boosted by the COVID-19 pandemic, video game sales had a sharp increase as people spent more time at home and turned to gaming as an outlet. From €3.6 billion in revenue in 2016, the market grew 40% in five years.

43% of all mobile app downloads in France are categorized as games, accounting for €1.4 billion in revenue. In 2020, 2.4 million consoles were sold and 27.5 million games were sold across physical and digital copies. 43% of games sold were digital, while 57% were physical copies.

In 2025, the three largest French video game groups in terms of revenue are Ubisoft, Voodoo, and Gameloft.

=== Demographics ===
As of 2021, there are a total of 36.5 million gamers in France, 53% of which are male. The age group of 24-35 year olds are the biggest gamer demographic by age, holding 31.1% of the French gamer population. However, 10-14 year olds in France have the highest percentage of gaming usage compared with other age groups, with over 96% of 10-14 year olds reporting to play video games in 2020.

== Developers ==
Major video game development studios began to establish during the 1990s and 2000s. Several have found popular success and continue to develop today.

=== Arkane Studios ===
Arkane Studios was founded in 1999 in the city Lyon by Raphaël Colantonio, a former employee of Electronic Arts. The first video game from Arkane, Arx Fatalis, was released in 2002. Today, Arkane is known for Dishonored, an action-adventure series, along with the 2021 release of Deathloop. Arkane also developed their own video game engine, Void Engine, based on a foundation of id Tech 5 created by id Software.

=== Quantic Dream ===
Quantic Dream was founded in 1997 by David Cage. The studio is known for its releases of Detroit: Become Human and Heavy Rain. The focus of Quantic Dream is to produce narrative based video games in the format of Interactive Drama.

=== Dontnod Entertainment ===
Dontnod Entertainment was founded in 2008 and is based in Paris. They are known for developing the graphic adventure series titled Life is Strange. Life is Strange was released episodically throughout 2015. Dontnod entertainment later released the first episode of Life is Strange 2 in September 2018 with the final episode released in December 2019.

== Publishers ==
=== Ubisoft ===
Ubisoft was established in 1986 by Yves Guillemot and his four brothers. Ubisoft initially distributed CD audio media, computers, and additional software to farmers and subsequently shifted to publishing video games. Yves Guillemot has said that Ubisoft has found value in open sandbox games with single and multiplayer modes which is why the company works on online games. Ubisoft's best selling game as of 2022 is Far Cry 5 (2018), grossing more than US$300 million in the first week of release.

=== Gameloft ===
Gameloft was founded by Michael Guillemot, a brother of Yves Guillemot, in 1999 after seeing the potential of the emerging market of mobile games. The group also develops and publishes games for PC and consoles, such as Asphalt Legends (2018), The Oregon Trail (2021) and Disney Dreamlight Valley (2023).

=== Focus Entertainment ===
Focus Entertainment was founded in 1996 and formerly Focus Home Entertainment. The publisher's most notable games are Farming Simulator, Pro Cycling Manager, and Trackmania.

== Education ==
=== National School of Video Games and Digital Interactive Media ===
The National School of Video Games and Digital Interactive Media (French: École Nationale du Jeu et des Médias Interactifs Numériques) located at the National Conservatory of Arts and Crafts (French: Conservatoire National des Arts et Métiers), or CNAM-ENJMIN, is a public school located in Angoulême devoted to video games and more generally to interactive digital media. It is the only public school in Europe that trains video games.

=== LISAA - School of Design ===
LISAA School of Art & Design (L'Institut Supérieur des Arts Appliqués) was founded in 1986 by Michel Glize. The LISSA School of Animation and Video Game offers several courses for video game design at the Bachelor's and Master's levels of study. The school is based in Paris with other campuses located in Bordeaux, Strasbourg, Nantes, and Rennes. International campuses are located in India and China.

=== ISART Paris ===
ISART Digital was founded in 2001 with main campuses based in France and Montreal. ISART Digital offers education in video games as well as 3D visual effects. The school implements a weekly rotating schedule with in-class instruction and industry experience at a workplace.

== Popular Titles ==
Best Selling Video Games in 2020
| Title | Number of Sales |
|---|---|
| FIFA 21 | 1,324,565 |
| Animal Crossing: New Horizons | 1,079,290 |
| Call of Duty: Black Ops Cold War | 664,792 |
| Grand Theft Auto V | 602, 423 |
| Assassin’s Creed Valhalla | 565,925 |
| Mario Kart 8 Deluxe | 553,789 |
| FIFA 20 | 537,097 |
| The Last of Us Part II | 434,486 |
| Call of Duty: Modern Warfare | 385,214 |
| Super Mario 3D All-Stars | 323,792 |
| Minecraft: Nintendo Switch Edition | 302,999 |
| NBA 2k20 | 269,607 |
| Ring Fit Adventure | 261,432 |
| 51 Worldwide Games | 257,545 |
| Luigi's Mansion 3 | 243,722 |

== Electronic Sports in France ==
In January 2016, Prime Minister Manuel Valls entrusted two parliamentarians, Rudy Salles and Jérôme Durain, with the task of "defining a legislative and regulatory framework favoring the development of video game competitions in France". The report submitted by the two parliamentarians in March 2016 calls, among other things, to "define a real framework for online and offline competitions", "create a specialized committee attached to the CNOSF", "give players a real status" Protect young players "through various measures and" encourage the recruitment of foreign players ".

This mission led to a participation in the bill for a digital Republic, which was adopted in first reading in the Senate on 3 May, with 323 votes in favor and 1 vote against. The law officially recognizes in chapter 4 section 2 the practice of video games in competition in France and an official status for professional players.

In parallel with this law, the government announced in May 2016 the creation of a "professional contract specific to the professional video game player" as well as the birth of the independent association "eSport".

On October 20, 2016, Nasser Al-Khelaïfi announced the launch of Paris Saint-Germain eSports, a section of the PSG, with YellOwStaR, former professional player of League of Legends, as director. Paris Saint-Germain eSports, with a multi-million euro budget, has active divisions in FIFA, League of Legends (PSG Talon), Dota 2 (PSG.LGD), FIFA Online, Brawl Stars, and Arena of Valor.

== Consoles ==
The most sold console in France in 2012 is the Nintendo 3DS, with approximately 950,000 copies, followed by PlayStation 3 (700,000 copies), Wii (372,000 copies), Xbox 360 (360,000 copies) and finally The Wii U, released only on November 30, with 118,000 sold.

At the release of the Wii U in France on November 30, 2012, 240,000 copies are placed on the market on its release.

Now the Nintendo Switch is the best selling console, as it has sold over 6.1 million units in France as of 2022.

== Events ==
In 2006 two video game shows, the Festival du Jeu Vidéo and the Micromania Game Show were created.

The Video Game Festival was the largest video game show in France before disappearing in 2010 with the creation of Paris Games Week. The last edition of the Video Game Festival was held on September 10, 11 and 12, 2010, but the content offered to visitors was very different from that proposed in other years. Indeed, SELL wanted to withdraw from the partnership with the Festival to create its own show, the Paris Games Week, considering that the Festival was not sufficiently general public and was not adapted to the ambitions of the SELL. The next month takes place the first edition of the Paris Games Week. On April 12, 2011, Jean-Claude Larue, President of SELL, announced that a space devoted to French creation would be integrated into the Paris Games Week, managed by Jonathan Dumont, founder of the Festival du Jeu Vidéo. Consequently, the Festival merges with the new SELL show, signing the end of the show.

With the creation of Paris Games Week, the Micromania Game Show changes direction and becomes a "video game night" in a Parisian cinema where publishers and developers come to present their video games through live demonstrations.

The Paris Games Week takes place every year at the Porte de Versailles exhibition center and in 2014 is the second largest video game fair in Europe, with its number of visitors, behind gamescom in Germany (335,000 visitors in 2014 ).

== Government Intervention ==
In 2016, Axelle Lemaire met with representatives of the French video game industry to discuss possible measures to combat sexism in video games. Financial incentives and labels to distinguish games that had a positive image of women were proposed but later dismissed.

As part of its goal to keep the French language pure from anglicized words, the French cultural ministry issued an order in May 2022 to ban some video game jargon that derived from English terms. Examples include "joueur professionnel" for professional gamer.
