= Absolver =

2017 video game

- Developer: Sloclap
- Publisher: Devolver Digital
- Directors: Pierre Tarno; Jordan Layani
- Producer: Pierre Tarno
- Designer: Jordan Layani
- Programmers: Aurélien Topia; Olivier Gaertner
- Artists: Michel Donzé; Paul-Emile Boucher
- Composer: Austin Wintory
- Engine: Unreal Engine 4
- Platforms: Windows; PlayStation 4; Xbox One
- Release: Windows, PS4: WW: August 29, 2017; Xbox One: WW: January 7, 2019
- Genre: Action role-playing
- Modes: Single-player, multiplayer

Absolver is a martial arts-themed action role-playing video game developed by Sloclap and published by Devolver Digital for PlayStation 4, Windows, and Xbox One. In the game, players control warrior characters who fight other players and computer-controlled characters across the fictional land of Adal to prove their worthiness of joining the Absolver peacekeepers. The game's story is focused on the human development of the characters as they fight to find their place in the collapsed empire. The character's fighting moves are customized in a "combat deck" of cards, with each card assigned to a move. Players earn cards, equipment, and weapons by progressing through the game.

Sloclap, a Parisian indie game developer composed of former Ubisoft Paris employees, began work on Absolver in May 2015. Their core game concept was to have fluid, dynamic movement, similar to dance. The game debuted a year later at the 2016 Electronic Entertainment Expo and was released in August 2017.

== Gameplay ==
Animated gameplay

Absolver is an action role-playing game based on martial arts fighting, featuring a seamless open world with shortcuts and free-roaming, and merging single, cooperative and competitive play in the same campaign, which is played from a third-person perspective. Players build custom combinations of strikes, parries, and feints to fight other players and computer-controlled characters. Players control warrior characters known as Prospects who travel the fictional land of Adal to fight other players and prove their worth to become one of the Absolver peacekeepers. Players progress through the game to unlock new armor and equipment, combat styles, and weapons, usually as "loot" dropped by defeated enemies. The game has minor massively multiplayer online game elements, including the feature of fighting alongside other players on quests and of directly fighting other players in player versus player match-ups. Players can also spar with others to teach their characters skills.

Players customize their characters' fighting moves—known as a move set—by adding and removing cards in a "combat deck", with each card assigned to a specific move. Additionally, players switch between four fighting stances during combat, which changes the moves available to the player. Each fighting stance has two attacks, each with its own controller button. Players earn additional cards by progressing through the game. Each card has a numerical rating for speed and damage dealt as well as secondary functions, such as the ability to break an opponent's guard. The moves in each stance can be set such that the player can switch between stances during a single combination of attacks to have the guard-breaking or absorption-interrupting moves that work best against the opponent's play style. The character can also equip a weapon, but its benefits and drawbacks are balanced: weapons are powerful but slower than many hand-to-hand attacks, and a player who takes damage may drop their weapon, allowing anyone to pick it up and use it.

== Development ==
Sloclap, a Parisian indie game studio composed of former Ubisoft Paris employees, began to develop its first game in May 2015. The team had previously worked on games including Watch Dogs and the Tom Clancy's Ghost Recon series. They began with the idea that combat should be "fluid" and "dynamic", like a personal choreography. Sloclap expressed this core concept through three internal taglines in their development: "combat is a dance", "movement is your weapon", and "make a move". Pierre Tarno, the game's creative director, liked how players could experiment with the combat deck to find a set that works best for them. Sloclap planned to closely monitor the game balance issues of creating overpowered move sets during online play, and planned to monitor this with playtesting. Absolver is built in the Unreal Engine 4 game engine. Absolver was first announced on May 26, 2016, and debuted at the June 2016 Electronic Entertainment Expo with Devolver Digital as its publisher. The game was released on August 29, 2017, for PlayStation 4 and Windows platforms.

== Reception ==
Reception

Aggregate score
Aggregator	Score
Metacritic	PC: 75/100; PS4: 69/100; XONE: 62/100

Review scores
Publication	Score
Game Informer	6.8/10
GameSpot	8/10
IGN	7.6/10
Polygon	8.5/10
USgamer	3.5/5 stars

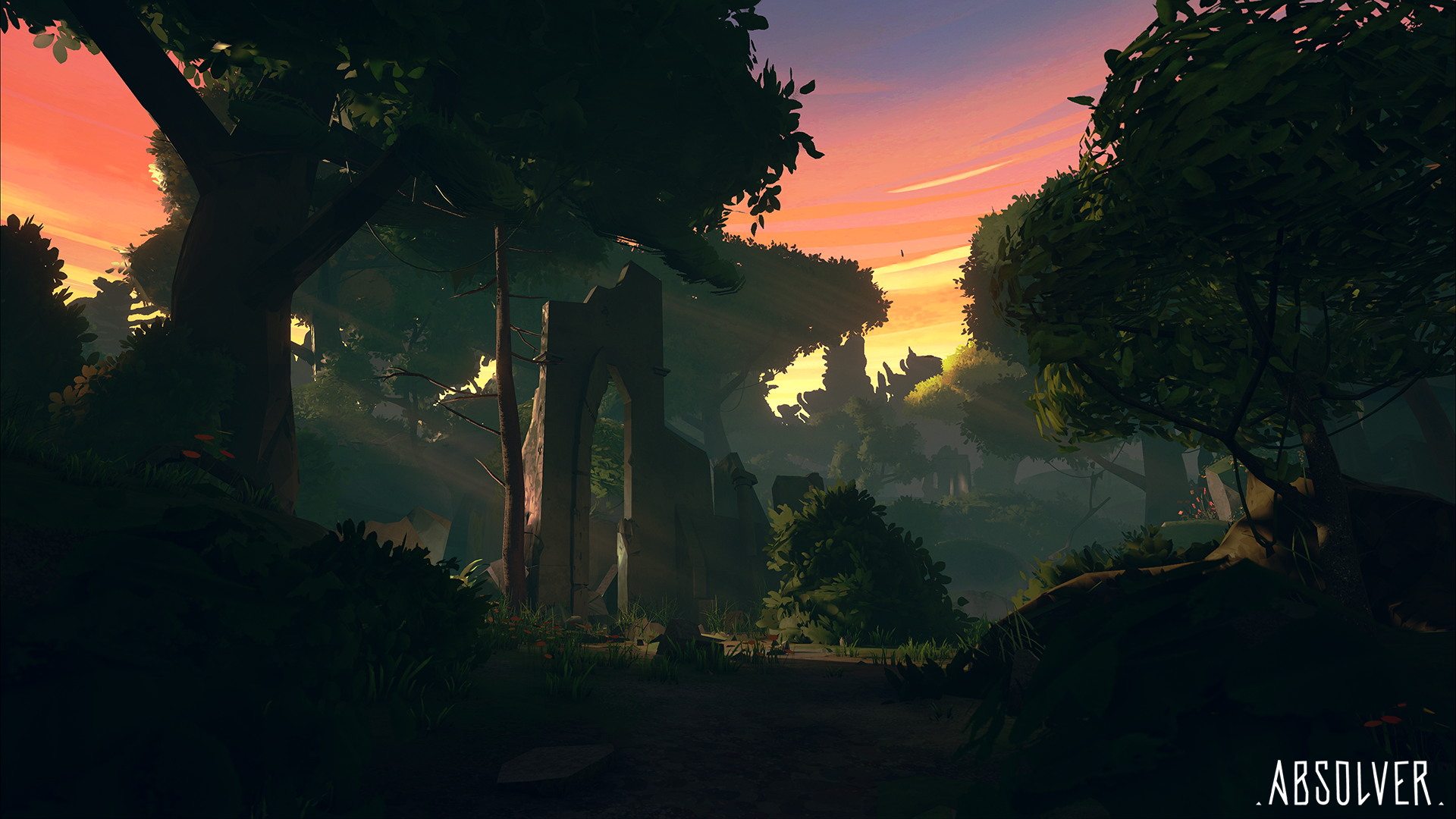
Critics such as Borque praised the game's art style as a departure from industry trends towards hyperrealism.

Critics who previewed the game compared its gameplay to that of Dark Souls and Street Fighter. In particular, Sam Prell (GamesRadar) found the Souls games and Absolver to share difficult melee fights that emphasize stamina management, and seamless multiplayer that adds both allies and enemies. Critics also noted how the game's simple controls quickly became complex, credited in particular to the game's combat deck concept. Kris Graft (Gamasutra) wrote that the fighting game was "a promising start" and one of the most interesting he has played. Absolver unexpectedly astonished Griffin McElroy (Polygon)—it was his "biggest surprise" of the 2016 Electronic Entertainment Expo. Sam Prell (GamesRadar) was also surprised by the depth of the combat system, and Andrew Tarantola (Engadget) noted the game's deviance from the traditional massively multiplayer online game for its lack of guns, and Brad Borque (Digital Trends) added that Absolver was quiet compared to other battle-focused games. Borque also complimented Absolver's palette and thought of its art style as a welcome break from the hyperrealism of recent games. Games journalists listed the game among the best in show at the 2016 Electronic Entertainment Expo where its other accolades included GamesRadar's "Best Indie Game of E3" and GamesBeat's "Killer App Killer" for "compelling and/or intuitive gameplay" in an Unreal Engine game.

Absolver received "mixed or average" reviews for the PS4 version of the game, while the PC version received "generally favorable" reviews from critics, according to review aggregator Metacritic.

The game was nominated for "Best Action Game" at PC Gamer's 2017 Game of the Year Awards, and for "Best Fighting Game" in IGN's Best of 2017 Awards.

=== Accolades ===
Year	Award	Category	Result	Ref.
2016	Game Critics Awards	Best Fighting Game	Nominated	
2016	Game Critics Awards	Best Online Multiplayer	Nominated	
2016	Game Critics Awards	Best Independent Game	Nominated	
2017	Golden Joystick Awards	Best Multiplayer Game	Nominated	
2017	Ping Awards	Best Indie Game	Nominated	
2018	National Academy of Video Game Trade Reviewers Awards	Game, Original Fighting	Nominated	
