= List of Nintendo Switch games (Q–Z) =

This is part of the list of Nintendo Switch games.

== List ==
There are currently 4133 games across List of Nintendo Switch games (0–9), List of Nintendo Switch games (A–Am), List of Nintendo Switch games (An–Az), List of Nintendo Switch games (B), List of Nintendo Switch games (C–G), List of Nintendo Switch games (H–P), and this page (Q–Z).

List of Nintendo Switch games
Title	Developer(s)	Publisher(s)	Release date	Ref.
Q.U.B.E. 2	Toxic Games	Trapped Nerve Games	February 21, 2019	
Qbics Paint	Abylight Studios	Abylight Studios	July 27, 2017	
Qbik	Norbert Palacz	Forever Entertainment	January 18, 2018	
Quad Fighter K	Happymeal	Happymeal	February 22, 2018	
Quake	id Software	Bethesda Softworks	August 19, 2021	
Quarantine Circular	Mike Bithell Games	Mike Bithell Games	December 8, 2018	
Quest of Dungeons	Upfall Studios	JP: Flyhigh Works; WW: Upfall Studios	August 10, 2017	
QV	Izzle	CFK	November 26, 2020	
Quiz Seikai wa Ichinengo presents Atsushi no Meitantei	Happymeal	Phoenixx	December 31, 2023	
R-Type Dimensions EX	Irem	Tozai Games	November 28, 2018	
R-Type Final 2	Granzella	JP: Granzella; WW: NIS America	April 29, 2021	
Rabbids: Party of Legends	Ubisoft Chengdu	Ubisoft	June 30, 2022	
Rabi Laby: Puzzle Out Stories	Silver Star Japan	Silver Star Japan	May 24, 2018	
Rabi-Ribi	CreSpirit, GemaYue	JP: Mediascape; WW: CIRCLE Entertainment	October 17, 2019	
Race with Ryan	3DClouds	Outright Games	November 1, 2019	
Rad	Double Fine	Bandai Namco Entertainment	August 20, 2019	
Rad Rodgers Radical Edition	Slipgate Studios	JP: Worker Bee; WW: HandyGames	February 26, 2019	
Radiant Silvergun	Treasure	Live Wire	September 13, 2022	
Radiant Tale	Design Factory	Idea Factory	May 26, 2022	
Radiant Tale: Fanfare!	Idea Factory	Idea Factory	August 31, 2023	
Radiation Island	Atypical Games	Atypical Games	February 22, 2018	
Radirgy Swag	RS34	RS34	June 13, 2019	
Rage in Peace	Rolling Glory Jam	Toge Productions	November 8, 2018	
Rage of the Dragons	QUByte Interactive	QUByte Interactive	November 14, 2024	
Raging Loop	Kemco	JP: Kemco; WW: PQube	August 3, 2017	
Raiden V: Director's Cut	Moss	UFO Interactive Games	July 25, 2019	
Railbound	Afterburn	7Levels	December 1, 2022	
Railway Empire	Gaming Minds Studios	JP: Ubisoft; WW: Kalypso Media	February 14, 2020	
Rainbow Billy: The Curse of the Leviathan	ManaVoid Entertainment	Skybound Games	October 5, 2021	
Rain World	Videocult	Adult Swim Games	December 13, 2018	
Raji: An Ancient Epic	Nodding Heads Games	Super.com	August 18, 2020	
Rally Racers	West Coast Software	System 3	January 11, 2018	
Raptor Evolution: Complete Edition	QubicGames	QubicGames	December 27, 2025	
Rashomon of Shinjuku	Altergear	Idea Factory	August 8, 2024	
Raspberry Mash	Ignition M	Ignition M	February 18, 2021	
The Raven Remastered	King Art Games	THQ Nordic	January 21, 2019	
Ravenwatch Legendary Edition	Passtech Games	Nacon	January 23, 2025	
Rayman Legends	Ubisoft Montpellier	Ubisoft	September 12, 2017	
R.B.I. Baseball 17	Nighthawk Interactive	MLB Advanced Media	September 5, 2017	
R.B.I. Baseball 18	MLB Advanced Media	MLB Advanced Media	June 14, 2018	
R.B.I. Baseball 19	MLB Advanced Media	MLB Advanced Media	March 5, 2019	
R.B.I. Baseball 20	MLB Advanced Media	MLB Advanced Media	March 16, 2020	
R.B.I. Baseball 21	MLB Advanced Media	MLB Advanced Media	March 16, 2021	
Read Only Memories: Neurodiver	MidBoss	MidBoss	May 16, 2024	
Real Heroes: Firefighter	Epicenter Studios, Scientifically Proven Entertainment	612 Entertainment, Golem Entertainment	November 27, 2019	
Realm Royale	Heroic Leap Games	Hi-Rez Studios	June 20, 2019	
RealMyst: Masterpiece Edition	Cyan Worlds	Cyan Worlds	May 21, 2020	
Rebel Galaxy Outlaw	Double Damage Games	Double Damage Games	September 22, 2020	
Record of Agarest War	Compile Heart	Aksys Games	March 9, 2023	
Record of Lodoss War: Deedlit in Wonder Labyrinth	Team Ladybug, Why So Serious?	Playism	December 16, 2021	
The Red Bell's Lament	Voltage	Voltage	June 5, 2025	
Red Dead Redemption	Double Eleven	Rockstar Games	August 17, 2023	
Red Faction: Guerrilla Re-Mars-tered	Kaiko	THQ Nordic	July 2, 2023	
The Red Strings Club	Deconstructeam	Devolver Digital	March 14, 2019	
Redeemer: Enhanced Edition	Sobaka Studio	JP: Teyon; WW: Good Shepherd Entertainment	July 19, 2019	
Redout	34BigThings	Nicalis	May 14, 2019	
Redout 2	34BigThings	Saber Interactive	June 16, 2022	
Reel Fishing: Road Trip Adventure	Natsume Inc.	Natsume Inc.	September 17, 2019	
Regalia: Of Men and Monarchs – Royal Edition	Pixelated Milk	Klabater, Crunching Koalas	April 12, 2018	
Reggie, His Cousin, Two Scientists and Most Likely the End of the World	Degoma	Degoma	2026	
Reigns: Beyond	Nerial	Devolver Digital	April 17, 2024	
Reigns: Game of Thrones	Nerial	Devolver Digital	April 11, 2019	
Reigns: Kings & Queens	Nerial	Devolver Digital	September 20, 2018	
RemiLore: Lost Girl in the Lands	PixeLore, Remimory	Nicalis	February 26, 2019	
Remnant: From the Ashes	Gunfire Games	THQ Nordic	March 21, 2023	
Remothered: Broken Porcelain	Stormind Games	Darril Arts	October 13, 2020	
Remothered: Tormented Fathers	Stormind Games	Darril Arts	June 27, 2019	
Research and Destroy	Implausible Industries	Spike Chunsoft	April 25, 2022	
Resident Evil	Capcom	Capcom	May 21, 2019	
Resident Evil 0	Capcom	Capcom	May 21, 2019	
Resident Evil 2	Capcom	Capcom	November 11, 2022	
Resident Evil 3	Capcom	Capcom	November 18, 2022	
Resident Evil 4	Capcom	Capcom	May 21, 2019	
Resident Evil 5	Capcom	Capcom	October 29, 2019	
Resident Evil 6	Capcom	Capcom	October 29, 2019	
Resident Evil 7: Biohazard	Capcom	Capcom	May 24, 2018	
Resident Evil: Origins Collection	Capcom	Capcom	May 21, 2019	
Resident Evil: Revelations	Capcom	Capcom	November 28, 2017	
Resident Evil: Revelations 2	Capcom	Capcom	November 28, 2017	
Resident Evil: Revelations Collection	Capcom	Capcom	January 1, 2023	
Resident Evil Triple Pack	Capcom	Capcom	November 21, 2021	
Resident Evil Village	Capcom	Capcom	October 28, 2022	
Retro City Rampage DX	Vblank Entertainment	Vblank Entertainment	August 3, 2017	
Retro Game Challenge 1 + 2 Replay	Namco Bandai Entertainment	Namco Bandai Entertainment	February 22, 2024	
Retro Bowl	New Star Games	New Star Games	February 10, 2022	
Retro Goal	New Star Games	New Star Games	November 24, 2022	
Retro Mystery Club Vol.1: The Ise-Shima Case	Happy Meal	Flyhigh Works	January 24, 2019	
Return of the Obra Dinn	3909	3909	October 18, 2019	
Return to Monkey Island	Terrible Toybox	Devolver Digital	September 19, 2022	
Revenant Dogma	Exe Create	Kemco	October 4, 2018	
Revenant Saga	Exe Create	Kemco	October 19, 2017	
Revenge of Justice	City Connection	Kemco	March 26, 2020	
Reverie: Sweet As Edition	Rainbite	Rainbite	February 7, 2019	
Reverie Knights Tactics	40 Giants Entertainment	1C Entertainment	January 25, 2022	
Revita	BenStar	Dear Villagers	April 21, 2022	
Reynatis	Natsume Atari, FuRyu	FuRyu, NIS America	July 25, 2024	
Re:Zero -Starting Life in Another World-: The Prophecy of the Throne	Chime	Spike Chunsoft	January 28, 2021	
Rhythm Heaven Groove	Nintendo SPD	Nintendo	July 2, 2026	
Rico: London	Ground Shatter	Aksys Games, Numskull Games	December 9, 2021	
Riki 8Bit Game Collection	City Connection	City Connection	November 28, 2024	
Rime	Tequila Works, Tantalus	Grey Box	November 14, 2017	
Ring Fit Adventure	Nintendo EPD	Nintendo	October 18, 2019	
Rise Eterna	Makee	Forever Entertainment	May 13, 2021	
The Rise of the Golden Idol	Color Gray Games	Playstack	November 13, 2024	
Rise of the Triad Remastered	Destructive Creations, Apogee Software	3D Realms	September 29, 2023	
Risen	Piranha Bytes	THQ Nordic	January 24, 2023	
Rising Hell	Toge Productions	Chorus Worldwide	May 21, 2021	
Risk of Rain	Hopoo Games	Chucklefish	September 20, 2018	
Risk of Rain 2	Hopoo Games	JP: Gearbox Publishing; WW: Chucklefish	August 30, 2019	
Rival Megagun	Mango Protocol	Mango Protocol	November 29, 2018	
Rivals of Aether	Petra Jurošková	Dan Fornace	September 24, 2020	
Rive	Two Tribes, Engine Software	JP: Flyhigh Works; WW: Two Tribes	November 17, 2017	
River City Girls	WayForward	Arc System Works	September 5, 2019	
River City Girls 2	WayForward	Arc System Works	December 1, 2022	
River City Girls Zero	WayForward	Arc System Works	February 14, 2022	
River City Melee Mach	WayForward	Arc System Works	October 10, 2019	
Riverbond	Cococucumber	Cococucumber	December 10, 2019	
Road to Guangdong	Just Add Oil Games	Excalibur Games	August 28, 2020	
Robonauts	QubicGames	QubicGames	September 15, 2017	
Robotics;Notes Dash	5pb.	JP: 5pb.; WW: Spike Chunsoft	January 31, 2019	
Robotics;Notes Elite	5pb.	JP: 5pb.; WW: Spike Chunsoft	January 31, 2019	
Rock 'N Racing Off Road DX	EnjoyUp Games	JP: Starsign; WW: EnjoyUp Games	November 9, 2017	
Rock of Ages 2: Bigger & Boulder	Ace Team	Sega	May 14, 2019	
Rock of Ages III: Make & Break	Giant Monkey Robot, Ace Team	JP: 3goo; WW: Modus Games	July 21, 2020	
Rocket League	Psyonix, Panic Button	Psyonix	November 14, 2017	
Rockets Rockets Rockets	Radial Games	Radial Games	November 15, 2018	
Roguebook	Abrakam Entertainment	Nacon	April 21, 2022	
Rogue Company	Hi-Rez Studios	Hi-Rez Studios	October 1, 2020	
Rogue Heroes: Ruins of Tasos	Heliocentric Studios	Team17	February 23, 2021	
Rogue Legacy	Cellar Door Games	Cellar Door Games	November 6, 2018	
Rogue Legacy 2	Cellar Door Games	Cellar Door Games	November 9, 2022	
Rogue Lords	Cyanide Studio, Leikir Studio	Nacon	May 12, 2022	
Rogue Trooper Redux	Rebellion Developments, TickTock Games	Rebellion Developments	October 17, 2017	
RollerCoaster Tycoon 3	Frontier Developments	Frontier Developments	September 24, 2020	
RollerCoaster Tycoon Adventures	Nvizzio Creations	Atari	December 6, 2018	
RollerCoaster Tycoon Classic	Graphite Lab	Atari	December 5, 2024	
Roller Champions	Ubisoft Montreal	Ubisoft	June 21, 2022	
Romancelvania: BATchelor's Curse	Deep End Games	Deep End Games	TBA	
Romance of the Three Kingdoms XIII	Koei	Koei Tecmo	March 30, 2017	
Romancing SaGa 2	ArtePiazza	Square Enix	December 15, 2017	
Romancing SaGa 3	ArtePiazza	Square Enix	November 11, 2019	
Romancing SaGa: Minstrel Song Remastered	Square Enix	Square Enix	December 1, 2022	
The Room	Fireproof Games	Team17	October 18, 2018	
Root Film	Kadokawa Games	JP: Kadokawa Games; WW: PQube	July 30, 2020	
Root Letter: Last Answer	Kadokawa Games	JP: Kadokawa Games; WW: PQube	December 20, 2018	
Roots of Pacha	Soda Den	Soda Den	April 25, 2023	
Royal Anapoko Academy	Ancient	Ancient	December 16, 2021	
RPGolf Legends	ArticNet	Kemco	January 20, 2022	
RPG Maker MV	Enterbrain	Kadokawa Games	November 15, 2018	
RPG Time: The Legend of Wright	DeskWorks	Aniplex	August 18, 2022	
Rugrats: Adventures in Gameland	Wallride	The MIX Games	September 10, 2024	
Rugrats: Retro Rewind Collection	Limited Run Games	Limited Run Games	May 15, 2026	
Ruined King: A League of Legends Story	Airship Syndicate	Riot Forge	November 16, 2021	
Ruiner	Reikon Games	Devolver Digital	June 18, 2020	
Runbow	13AM Games, Headup Games	Rainy Frog	July 3, 2018	
Rune Factory 3 Special	Marvelous	JP: Marvelous; WW: Xseed Games	March 2, 2023	
Rune Factory 4 Special	Marvelous	JP: Marvelous; WW: Xseed Games	July 25, 2019	
Rune Factory 5	Marvelous	JP: Marvelous; WW: Xseed Games	May 20, 2021	
Runestone Keeper	Innoteg, Cimu Games	Circle Entertainment	August 20, 2020	
Runner3	Choice Provisions	Choice Provisions	May 22, 2018	
Rusted Moss	faxdoc, happysquared, sunnydaze	Playism	June 20, 2024	
RWBY: Grimm Eclipse – Definitive Edition	Rooster Teeth Games	Aspyr	May 13, 2021	
RWBY: Arrowfell	WayForward	Arc System Works	November 15, 2022	
RXN: Raijin	Gulti	Kayac	December 14, 2017	
Ryan's Rescue Squad	Stage Clear Studios	Outright Games	March 4, 2022	
The Ryuo's Work Is Never Done!	Entergram	Entergram	December 17, 2020	
Saboteur	Clive Townsend	SimFabric	November 9, 2018	
Sacred Stones	CFK	CFK	December 12, 2019	
SacriFire	Pixelated Milk	Pixelated Milk	2026	
SaGa: Scarlet Grace	Square Enix	Square Enix	August 2, 2018	
SaGa Frontier Remastered	Square Enix	Square Enix	April 15, 2021	
Sakaagari Hurricane Portable	Giga	Entergram	October 28, 2021	
Saint Kotar	Red Martyr Entertainment	Soedesco	October 14, 2022	
Saints Row: The Third	Volition	JP: Koch Media; WW: Deep Silver	May 9, 2019	
Saints Row IV: Re-Elected	Volition	Deep Silver	March 27, 2020	
Sakuna: Of Rice and Ruin	Edelweiss	Xseed Games	November 10, 2020	
Sally's Law	Nanali Studios	Nanali Studios	April 4, 2018	
Salt and Sanctuary	Ska Studios	Ska Studios	August 2, 2018	
Saltsea Chronicles	Die Gute Fabrik	Die Gute Fabrik	October 12, 2023	
Sam & Max Beyond Time and Space Remastered	Skunkape Games	Skunkape Games	December 8, 2021	
Sam & Max Save the World Remastered	Skunkape Games	Skunkape Games	December 2, 2020	
Sam & Max: The Devil's Playhouse Remastered	Skunkape Games	Skunkape Games	August 14, 2024	
Samba de Amigo: Party Central	Sega	Sega	August 29, 2023	
Samurai Jack: Battle Through Time	Soleil Ltd.	JP: DMM Games; WW: Adult Swim Games	August 21, 2020	
Samurai Shodown	SNK	SNK	December 12, 2019	
Samurai Shodown NeoGeo Collection	SNK	SNK	June 11, 2020	
Samurai Warriors 5	Omega Force	Koei Tecmo	June 24, 2021	
Samurai Warriors: Spirit of Sanada	Omega Force	Koei Tecmo	November 9, 2017	
Sanrio Characters Miracle Match: Magical Onigokko	Imagineer	Imagineer	March 27, 2025	
Saturday Morning RPG	Mighty Rabbit Studios	Limited Run Games	April 26, 2018	
Sausage Sports Club	Luckshot Games	Luckshot Games	July 19, 2018	
Save Me Mr Tako	Deneos Games	Nicalis	October 30, 2018	
Save Me Mr Tako: Definitive Edition	Deneos Games	Limited Run Games	May 5, 2021	
Saviors of Sapphire Wings	Experience	NIS America	March 16, 2021	
Sayonara Wild Hearts	Simogo	Annapurna Interactive	September 19, 2019	
Schlag den Star: Das Spiel	Lost the Game Studios	BitComposer Interactive	September 29, 2017	
Scott Pilgrim vs. the World: The Game - Complete Edition	Engine Software	Ubisoft	January 14, 2021	
ScourgeBringer	Flying Oak Games, E-Studio	Dear Villagers	October 21, 2020	
Screencheat: Unplugged	Samurai Punk	Surprise Attack	November 29, 2018	
Scribblenauts Mega Pack	Shiver Entertainment	WB Games	September 18, 2018	
Scribblenauts Showdown	Shiver Entertainment	Warner Bros. Interactive Entertainment	March 6, 2018	
SD Gundam G Generation Cross Rays	Bandai Namco Studios	Bandai Namco Entertainment	November 28, 2019	
SD Gundam G Generation Genesis	Bandai Namco Studios	Bandai Namco Entertainment	April 26, 2018	
Sea of Solitude: The Director's Cut	Jo-Mei Games	Quantic Dream	March 4, 2021	
Sea of Stars	Sabotage Studio	Sabotage Studio	August 29, 2023	
Seek Hearts	Exe Create	Kemco	January 16, 2020	
Sega Genesis Classics	d3t	Sega	December 6, 2018	
Semblance	Nyamakop	Nyamakop	July 24, 2018	
Semispheres	Vivid Helix	Vivid Helix	September 14, 2017	
Sense: A Cyberpunk Ghost Story	Suzaku	Top Hat Studios	January 7, 2021	
Senran Kagura: Peach Ball	Marvelous	Marvelous	December 13, 2018	
Senran Kagura: Reflexions	Marvelous	NA: Xseed Games; PAL: Marvelous	November 24, 2017	
Senri no Kifu: Gendai Shougi Mystery	Kemco	Kemco	February 27, 2020	
Sephonie	Analgesic Productions	Ratalaika Games	July 21, 2023	
Serial Cleaner	iFun4all	Curve Digital	November 30, 2017	
Serial Cleaners	Draw Distance	Draw Distance	September 22, 2022	
Serious Sam Collection	Croteam	Devolver Digital	November 17, 2020	
Seven Knights: Time Wanderer	Netmarble	Netmarble	November 5, 2020	
Severed	DrinkBox Studios	JP: Flyhigh Works; WW: DrinkBox Studios	August 8, 2017	
The Sexy Brutale	Tequila Works, Cavalier Game Studios	JP: Nippon Ichi Software; WW: Tequila Works	December 7, 2017	
Shadow Corridor	Kazuki Shiroma	JP: Regista; WW: NIS America	August 8, 2019	
Shadow Labyrinth	Bandai Namco Studios	Bandai Namco Entertainment	July 18, 2025	
Shadow Man Remastered	Nightdive Studios	Nightdive Studios	January 17, 2022	
Shadowgate	Abstraction Games	Abstraction Games	April 11, 2019	
Shadowrun: Dragonfall - Director's Cut	Paradox Interactive	Paradox Interactive	June 21, 2022	
Shadowrun: Hong Kong	Paradox Interactive	Paradox Interactive	June 21, 2022	
Shadowrun Returns	Paradox Interactive	Paradox Interactive	June 21, 2022	
Shadowverse: Champion's Battle	Cygames	JP: Cygames; NA: Xseed Games; PAL: Marvelous Europe	November 5, 2020	
Shakedown: Hawaii	Vblank Entertainment	Vblank Entertainment	May 7, 2019	
Shantae	WayForward	WayForward	April 22, 2021	
Shantae: Half-Genie Hero	WayForward	WayForward	June 8, 2017	
Shantae: Risky's Revenge - Director's Cut	WayForward	WayForward	October 15, 2020	
Shantae Advance: Risky Revolution	WayForward	WayForward	August 19, 2025	
Shantae and the Pirate's Curse	WayForward	WayForward	March 20, 2018	
Shantae and the Seven Sirens	WayForward	JP: Oizumi Amuzio; WW: WayForward	May 28, 2020	
Shattered – Tale of the Forgotten King	Redlock Studio	Forthright Entertainment	April 22, 2022	
Shaolin5	Burger Studio	Clouded Leopard Entertainment	TBA	
Shaq Fu: A Legend Reborn	Big Deez Productions	Saber Interactive	June 5, 2018	
She Dreams Elsewhere	Studio Zevere	Studio Zevere	TBA	
She and the Light Bearer	Mojiken Studio	Toge Productions	June 6, 2019	
Shelter Generations	Circle Entertainment	Circle Entertainment	April 12, 2018	
Sheltered	Unicube Studios	Team17	December 18, 2018	
Sherlock Holmes: The Awakened	Frogwares	Frogwares	April 11, 2023	
Sherlock Holmes: Crimes & Punishments	Frogwares	Frogwares	February 3, 2022	
Sherlock Holmes: The Devil's Daughter	Frogwares	Frogwares	April 7, 2022	
Shift Quantum	Fishing Cactus	Red Panda Interactive	May 29, 2018	
Shikabanegurai no Boukenmeshi	Nippon Ichi Software	Nippon Ichi Software	January 27, 2022	
Shin Megami Tensei III: Nocturne HD Remaster	Atlus	Atlus	October 29, 2020	
Shin Megami Tensei V	Atlus	WW: Atlus; PAL: Nintendo	November 11, 2021	
Shing!	Mass Creation	Mass Creation	January 21, 2021	
Spirit Hunter: Death Mark II	Experience	Experience	December 1, 2022	
Shining Resonance Refrain	Sega	Sega	July 10, 2018	
Shinobi: Art of Vengeance	Lizardcube, Seaven Studios	Sega	August 29, 2025	
Shinobi, Koi Utsutsu: Banka Aya Emaki	Idea Factory	Idea Factory	August 27, 2020	
Shinobi non Grata	Studio PICO, Esquadra	Flyhigh Works	August 17, 2023	
Shinrai	Gosatsu Visual Novels	Ratalaika Games	October 29, 2021	
Shiren the Wanderer: The Tower of Fortune and the Dice of Fate	Spike Chunsoft	Spike Chunsoft	December 2, 2020	
Shiritsu BeruBara Gakuen: Versailles no Bara Re*Imagination	Idea Factory	Idea Factory	May 23, 2019	
Shinsekai: Into the Depths	Capcom	Capcom	March 26, 2020	
A Short Hike	Adamgryu	JP: Whippoorwill; WW: Adamgryu	August 18, 2020	
Shotgun Cop Man	DeadToast Entertainment	Devolver Digital	May 1, 2025	
Shovel Knight	Yacht Club Games	Yacht Club Games	March 3, 2017	
Shovel Knight Dig	Nitrome	Yacht Club Games	September 23, 2022	
Shovel Knight: Pocket Dungeon	Vine	Yacht Club Games	December 13, 2021	
The Shrouded Isle	Kitfox Games	Kitfox Games	January 17, 2019	
Shu	Coatsink	Coatsink	January 23, 2018	
Shuryou no Suiri Ryouiki: Ougon Shima no Mitsuyaku	Orange	Orange	July 1, 2021	
Shuten Order	Too Kyo Games, Neilo	JP: DMM Games; WW: Spike Chunsoft	September 5, 2025	
Siegecraft Commander	Blowfish Studios	Blowfish Studios	September 19, 2018	
Sifu	Sloclap	Sloclap	November 8, 2022	
Signalis	rose-engine	Humble Games, Playism	October 27, 2022	
Silent World	GniFrix	CFK	March 19, 2020	
Silt	Spiral Circus	Fireshine Games	June 1, 2022	
The Silver Case	Grasshopper Manufacture, Active Gaming Media	Playism	February 18, 2021	
Sine Mora EX	Digital Reality, Grasshopper Manufacture	THQ Nordic	September 26, 2017	
The Sinking City	Frogwares	Bigben Interactive	September 12, 2019	
Sinner: Sacrifice for Redemption	Dark Star	Another Indie	October 18, 2018	
Sir Eatsalot	Behind the Stone	EastAsiaSoft	January 9, 2020	
Sisters Royale	Alfa System	JP: Alfa System; WW: Chorus Worldwide	June 14, 2018	
Sixtar Gate: Startrail	Lyrebird Studio, Magical Works	CFK	March 16, 2023	
Skatebird	Glass Bottom Gaming	Glass Bottom Gaming	September 16, 2021	
Skater XL	Easy Day Studios	Easy Day Studios	December 5, 2023	
Skellboy	Umaiki Games	Umaiki Games	January 30, 2020	
Skellboy Refractured	Umaiki Games	Fabraz	June 4, 2021	
Skies of Fury DX	Illumination Games, Seed Interactive	Ingenium	April 12, 2018	
Skul: The Hero Slayer	SouthPAW Games	Neowiz	October 21, 2021	
Skullgirls 2nd Encore	Reverge Labs	Marvelous, Autumn Games, Arc System Works	October 22, 2019	
Sky: Children of the Light	Thatgamecompany	Thatgamecompany	June 29, 2021	
Skydrift Infinity	Digital Reality	HandyGames	July 29, 2021	
Sky Force Anniversary	Infinite Dreams	Infinite Dreams	February 1, 2018	
Sky Force Reloaded	Infinite Dreams	Infinite Dreams	November 8, 2018	
Skyforge	Allods Team, Obsidian Entertainment	My.com	February 4, 2021	
Skylanders: Imaginators	Toys for Bob, Vicarious Visions	Activision	March 3, 2017	
Skypeace	Sonic Powered	Sonic Powered	April 26, 2018	
Slain: Back from Hell	Wolf Brew Games, Stage Clear Studios	Digerati	December 7, 2017	
Slay the Spire	MegaCrit	Humble Bundle	June 6, 2019	
Slayaway Camp: Butcher's Cut	Blue Wizard Digital, Stage Clear Studios	Stage Clear Studios	March 22, 2018	
Slender: The Arrival	Blue Isle Studios	Blue Isle Studios	June 20, 2019	
Slime Rancher: Plortable Edition	Monomi Park	Skybound Games	August 11, 2021	
Slime Tactics	Altair Works	Flyhigh Works	April 11, 2019	
Sludge Life	Terri Vellmann, Doseone	Devolver Digital	June 2, 2021	
Smite	Titan Forge Games	Hi-Rez Studios	January 24, 2019	
Smoke and Sacrifice	Solar Sail Games	JP: Teyon; WW: Curve Digital	May 31, 2018	
Smurfs Kart	Eden Games	Microids	November 15, 2022	
The Smurfs: Mission Vileaf	OSome Studios	Microids	November 5, 2021	
The Smurfs: Village Party	Balio Studio	Microids	June 6, 2024	
Snack World: The Dungeon Crawl – Gold	Level-5	Level-5	April 12, 2018	
Snake Core	OrangePixel	OrangePixel	February 26, 2023	
Snake.io	Kooapps	Kooapps	November 14, 2024	
Snake Pass	Sumo Digital	JP: Konami; WW: Sumo Digital	March 28, 2017	
Snakebird Complete	Noumenon Games	Astra Logical	November 24, 2023	
Snakeybus	Stovetop Studios	Digerati	April 2, 2020	
Sniper Elite III	Rebellion Developments	Rebellion Developments	October 1, 2019	
Sniper Elite 4	Rebellion Developments	Rebellion Developments	November 17, 2020	
Sniper Elite V2 Remastered	Rebellion Developments	Rebellion Developments	May 14, 2019	
Snipperclips	SFB Games	Nintendo	March 3, 2017	
Snipperclips Plus	SFB Games	Nintendo	November 10, 2017	
SNK 40th Anniversary Collection	SNK, Digital Eclipse	SNK	November 13, 2018	
SNK Gals' Fighters	Code Mystics	SNK	April 29, 2020	
SNK Heroines: Tag Team Frenzy	SNK	Nippon Ichi Software	September 6, 2018	
SNK vs. Capcom: The Match of the Millennium	SNK	SNK	February 17, 2021	
Snow Moto Racing Freedom	Zordix	Bigben Interactive	November 24, 2017	
SnowRunner	Saber Interactive	Focus Home Interactive	May 18, 2021	
Snooker 19	Lab42	Ripstone Games	August 23, 2019	
Snufkin: Melody of Moominvalley	Hyper Games	Raw Fury	March 7, 2024	
Soccer Slammers	Atooi	Atooi	June 14, 2018	
Sol Cresta	PlatinumGames	PlatinumGames	February 22, 2022	
Sol Divide: Sword of Darkness	Zerodiv	Zerodiv	March 22, 2018	
Soldam: Drop, Connect, Erase	City Connection	Dispatch Games	March 3, 2017	
Solomon Program	Konami	Konami	February 25, 2021	
SolSeraph	Ace Team	Sega	July 10, 2019	
Solstice Chronicles: MIA	Ironward	Circle Entertainment	February 7, 2019	
Soma	Frictional Games	Abylight Studios	July 24, 2025	
Songbringer	Wizard Fu Games	Double Eleven	May 31, 2018	
Song of Nunu: A League of Legends Story	Tequila Works	Riot Forge	November 1, 2023	
Sonic Colors: Ultimate	Blind Squirrel Games	Sega	September 7, 2021	
Sonic Forces	Sonic Team	Sega	November 7, 2017	
Sonic Frontiers	Sonic Team	Sega	November 8, 2022	
Sonic Mania	Headcannon, PagodaWest Games, Tantalus Media	Sega	August 15, 2017	
Sonic Mania Plus	Headcannon, PagodaWest Games, Tantalus Media	Sega	July 17, 2018	
Sonic Origins	Sonic Team, Headcannon	Sega	June 23, 2022	
Sonic Origins Plus	Sonic Team, Headcannon	Sega	June 23, 2023	
Sonic Racing: CrossWorlds	Sonic Team	Sega	September 25, 2025	
Sonic Superstars	Arzest, Sonic Team	Sega	October 17, 2023	
Sonic X Shadow Generations	Sonic Team	Sega	October 25, 2024	
Sonic Wings Reunion	Success	Hamster Corporation	May 29, 2025	
Sonzai	2 Odd Diodes	Top Hat Studios	TBA	
Sorcerer Knights	4WayStudio	Game Nacional	January 1, 2022	
Souldiers	Retro Forge	Dear Villagers	June 2, 2022	
Source of Madness	NIS America	NIS America	May 11, 2022	
South Park: The Fractured but Whole	Ubisoft San Francisco	Ubisoft	April 24, 2018	
South Park: Snow Day!	Question LLC	THQ Nordic	March 26, 2024	
South Park: The Stick of Truth	Obsidian Entertainment	Ubisoft	September 25, 2018	
Spacebase Startopia	Realmforge Studios	Kalypso Media	September 16, 2021	
Space Crew	Runner Duck	Curve Digital	October 15, 2020	
Space Dave!	Choice Provisions	Choice Provisions	January 25, 2018	
A Space for the Unbound	Mojiken Studio	Toge Productions, Chorus Worldwide	January 19, 2023	
Space Invaders Forever	Taito	JP: Taito; WW: Inin Games	December 11, 2020	
Space Invaders Invincible Collection	Taito	JP: Taito; WW: Inin Games	March 26, 2020	
Space Warlord Organ Trading Simulator	Strange Scaffold	Strange Scaffold	April 29, 2022	
Sparkle 2	10tons	10tons	September 28, 2017	
Sparkle 2 Evo	Madman Theory Games, Plastic Games	JP: Rainy Frog; WW: Forever Entertainment	November 2, 2017	
Sparkle 3 Genesis	Madman Theory Games, Plastic Games	JP: Rainy Frog; WW: Forever Entertainment	March 15, 2018	
Sparklite	Red Blue Games	Merge Games	November 14, 2019	
Speaking Simulator	Affable Games	JP: Rainy Frog; WW: Affable Games	January 30, 2020	
Spectacular Sparky	FreakZone Games	Nicalis	October 20, 2021	
The Spectrum Retreat	Dan Smith	Ripstone Games	September 13, 2018	
SpeedRunners	DoubleDutch Games	TinyBuild	January 23, 2020	
Spellbreak	Proletariat	Proletariat	September 3, 2020	
Spelunker HD Deluxe	Irem Software Engineering	ININ Games	August 6, 2021	
Spelunker Party!	Tozai Games	Square Enix	April 20, 2017	
Spelunky	Mossmouth	Mossmouth	August 26, 2021	
Spelunky 2	Mossmouth, BlitWorks	Mossmouth	August 26, 2021	
Sphinx and the Cursed Mummy	THQ Nordic, Eurocom	THQ Nordic	January 29, 2019	
Spice and Wolf VR	Spicy Tails	Gemdrops	September 5, 2019	
Spinch	Queen Bee Games	Akupara Games	September 3, 2020	
Spintires: MudRunner - American Wilds	Saber Interactive	JP: Oizumi Amuzio; WW: Focus Home Interactive	November 27, 2018	
Spiral Memoria: The Summer I Meet Myself	Opera House	Digimerse	July 30, 2020	
Spiritfarer	Thunder Lotus Games	Thunder Lotus Games	August 18, 2020	
SpiritSphere DX	Eendhoorn	Fabraz	July 2, 2018	
Spirit Hunter: NG	Experience	JP: Experience; WW: Aksys Games	October 10, 2019	
Spirit Hunter: Death Mark II	Experience	JP: Experience; WW: Aksys Games	December 1, 2022	
Spirit: Lucky's Big Adventure	aheartfulofgames	Outright Games	June 1, 2021	
Splasher	SplashTeam	JP: Flyhigh Works; WW: Plug In Digital	October 26, 2017	
Splatoon 2	Nintendo EPD	Nintendo	July 21, 2017	
Splatoon 3	Nintendo EPD	Nintendo	September 9, 2022	
SpongeBob SquarePants: Battle for Bikini Bottom – Rehydrated	Purple Lamp Studios	THQ Nordic	June 23, 2020	
SpongeBob SquarePants: The Cosmic Shake	Purple Lamp Studios	THQ Nordic	January 31, 2023	
SpongeBob SquarePants: The Patrick Star Game	PHL Collective	Outright Games	October 4, 2024	
Sports Story	Sidebar Games	Sidebar Games	December 23, 2022	
Spy Bros.: Pipi & Bibi's DX	RAWRLAB Games	RAWRLAB Games	February 14, 2023	
Spyro: Reignited Trilogy	Toys for Bob	Activision	September 3, 2019	
The Stanley Parable: Ultra Deluxe	Galactic Cafe, Crows Crows Crows	Galactic Cafe	April 27, 2022	
Star-Crossed Myth: The Department of Punishments	Voltage	Voltage	August 29, 2019	
Star-Crossed Myth: The Department of Wishes	Voltage	Voltage	August 29, 2019	
Star Melody: Yumemi Dreamer	Kogado Studio	Kogado Studio	January 27, 2022	
Star Ocean: First Departure R	Tri-Ace	Square Enix	December 5, 2019	
Star Ocean: The Second Story R	Gemdrops	Square Enix	November 2, 2023	
Star Renegades	Massive Damage	JP: DMM Games; WW: Raw Fury	November 19, 2020	
Star Wars: Battlefront Classic Collection	Aspyr	Aspyr	March 14, 2024	
Star Wars Episode I: Jedi Power Battles	Aspyr	Aspyr	January 23, 2025	
Star Wars Episode I: Racer	Aspyr	Lucasfilm Games	June 23, 2020	
Star Wars: Hunters	NaturalMotion	Zynga	June 4, 2024	
Star Wars Jedi Knight: Jedi Academy	Raven Software	NA: LucasArts; PAL: Activision	March 26, 2020	
Star Wars Jedi Knight II: Jedi Outcast	Raven Software	Disney Interactive Studios	September 24, 2019	
Star Wars: Knights of the Old Republic	Aspyr	Lucasfilm Games	November 11, 2021	
Star Wars Knights of the Old Republic II: The Sith Lords	Aspyr	Lucasfilm Games	June 8, 2022	
Star Wars Pinball	Zen Studios	JP: Game Source Entertainment; WW: Zen Studios	September 13, 2019	
Star Wars: Republic Commando	LucasArts	Aspyr	April 6, 2021	
Star Wars: The Force Unleashed	Krome Studios	Aspyr	April 20, 2022	
Stardew Valley	ConcernedApe	ConcernedApe	October 5, 2017	
Starlink: Battle for Atlas	Ubisoft Toronto	Virtuos	October 16, 2018	
State of Mind	Daedalic Entertainment	Daedalic Entertainment	August 15, 2018	
Stay Cool, Kobayashi-san!: A River City Ransom Story	Arc System Works	Arc System Works	November 7, 2019	
Steam Prison	HuneX	Dramatic Create	February 25, 2021	
SteamWorld Dig	Image & Form	Image & Form	February 1, 2018	
SteamWorld Dig 2	Image & Form	Image & Form	September 21, 2017	
SteamWorld Heist	Image & Form	Image & Form	December 28, 2017	
SteamWorld Quest: Hand of Gilgamech	Image & Form	JP: Flyhigh Works; WW: Thunderful Publishing	April 25, 2019	
Steins;Gate 0	5pb.	JP: 5pb.; WW: Spike Chunsoft	March 20, 2019	
Steins;Gate Elite	5pb.	JP: 5pb.; WW: Spike Chunsoft	September 20, 2018	
Steins;Gate: Linear Bounded Phenogram	5pb.	5pb.	March 20, 2019	
Steins;Gate: My Darling's Embrace	5pb.	JP: 5pb.; WW: Spike Chunsoft	March 20, 2019	
Stela	SkyBox Labs	SkyBox Labs	March 13, 2020	
Stern Pinball Arcade	FarSight Studios	FarSight Studios	December 12, 2017	
Steven Universe: Save the Light	Grumpyface Studios	Cartoon Network Games	October 30, 2018	
Steven Universe: Unleash the Light	Grumpyface Studios	Cartoon Network Games	February 19, 2021	
The Stillness of the Wind	Memory of God	Fellow Traveller	February 7, 2019	
The Stone of Madness	Teku Studios	Merge Games	January 28, 2025	
Stories Untold	No Code	Devolver Digital	January 16, 2020	
Story of Seasons: Friends of Mineral Town	Marvelous	NA: Xseed Games; WW: Marvelous	October 17, 2019	
Story of Seasons: Pioneers of Olive Town	Marvelous	NA: Xseed Games; WW: Marvelous	February 25, 2021	
Stranded Sails: Explorers of the Cursed Islands	Lemonbomb Entertainment	Merge Games	October 17, 2019	
Strange Antiques	Iceberg Antiquities	Iceberg Interactive	September 17, 2025	
Strange Brigade	Rebellion Developments	Rebellion Developments	June 15, 2021	
Stranger of Sword City Revisited	Experience	NIS America	March 16, 2021	
Stranger Things 3: The Game	BonusXP	Netflix	July 4, 2019	
Strania: The Stella Machina EX	G.rev	exA-Arcadia	January 23, 2025	
Stray	BlueTwelve Studio	Annapurna Interactive	November 19, 2024	
Stray Children	Onion Games	Onion Games	December 26, 2024	
A Street Cat's Tale	feemodev	CFK	March 12, 2020	
Street Fighter 30th Anniversary Collection	Capcom	Capcom	May 29, 2018	
Street Power Soccer	SFL Interactive, Gamujan	Maximum Games	August 25, 2020	
Streets of Rage 4	Lizardcube, Guard Crush Games, Dotemu	Dotemu	April 30, 2020	
Streets of Red: Devil's Dare Deluxe	Secret Base	JP: Circle Entertainment; WW: Secret Base	March 29, 2018	
Streets of Rogue	Matt Dabrowski	TinyBuild	July 12, 2019	
The Stretchers	Tarsier Studios	Nintendo	November 8, 2019	
Strife: Veteran Edition	Rogue Entertainment	Nightdive Studios	October 25, 2020	
Strike Suit Zero: Director's Cut	Born Ready	Born Ready	May 2, 2019	
Strikers 1945	Zerodiv	Zerodiv	August 3, 2017	
Strikers 1945 II	Zerodiv	Zerodiv	January 25, 2018	
Struggling	Chasing Rats Games	Chasing Rats Games	August 27, 2020	
Stubbs the Zombie in Rebel Without a Pulse	Wideload Games	Aspyr	March 16, 2021	
Subnautica	Unknown Worlds Entertainment	Unknown Worlds Entertainment	May 14, 2021	
Subnautica: Below Zero	Unknown Worlds Entertainment	Bandai Namco Entertainment	May 14, 2021	
Subsurface Circular	Bithell Games	Bithell Games	March 1, 2018	
SuchArt!	Voolgi	Voolgi	October 23, 2025	
Suicide Guy	Fabio Ferrera	Chubby Pixel	May 10, 2018	
Sumer	Studio Wumpus	Studio Wumpus	April 5, 2018	
Sumikko Gurashi: Oheya no Sumi de Tabi Kibun Sugoroku	Nippon Columbia	Nippon Columbia	December 3, 2020	
Sumikko Gurashi: Sumikko Park e Youkoso	Nippon Columbia	Nippon Columbia	December 7, 2017	
Sumire	GameTomo	GameTomo	May 27, 2021	
Summer in Mara	Chibig Studio	JP: Pikii; WW: Chibig Studio	June 16, 2020	
Summer Pockets	Key	Prototype	June 20, 2019	
Summer Time Rendering: Another Horizon	Mages	Mages	January 26, 2023	
Sunshower	NOKOGODO	Studio Kumiho	February 19, 2025	
Sunless Sea: Zubmariner Edition	Failbetter Games, Nephilim Games	Digerati	April 23, 2020	
Sunless Skies: Sovereign Edition	Failbetter Games	Digerati	May 19, 2021	
Sun Haven	Pixel Sprout Studios	Pixel Sprout Studios	November 29, 2024	
Super Animal Royale	Pixile	Modus Games	August 26, 2021	
Super Beat Sports	Harmonix	Harmonix	November 2, 2017	
Super Bomberman Collection	Red Art Games	Konami	February 5, 2026	
Super Bomberman R	Konami, HexaDrive	Konami	March 3, 2017	
Super Bomberman R Online	Konami	Konami	May 27, 2021	
Super Bullet Break	BeXide	PQube	August 12, 2022	
Super Chariot	Frima Studio	Microids	May 10, 2018	
Super Chipflake Ü: Quest for the Uncooked Schnitzel	SalsaShark Studios	BySamb	January 19, 2026	
Super Crate Box	Vlambeer	Vlambeer	October 1, 2019	
Super Dragon Ball Heroes: World Mission	Dimps	Bandai Namco Entertainment	April 4, 2019	
Super Hydorah	Locomalito, Gryzor87	Abylight Studios	November 15, 2018	
Super Kirby Clash	HAL Laboratory	Nintendo	September 4, 2019	
Super Lone Survivor	Superflat Games	Curve Digital	October 31, 2022	
Super Magbot	Astral Pixel	Team17	June 22, 2021	
Super Mario 3D All-Stars	Nintendo EPD	Nintendo	September 18, 2020	
Super Mario 3D World + Bowser's Fury	Nintendo EPD	Nintendo	February 12, 2021	
Super Mario Bros. 35	Arika	Nintendo	October 1, 2020	
Super Mario Bros. Wonder	Nintendo EPD	Nintendo	October 20, 2023	
Super Mario Galaxy	Nintendo Software Technology	Nintendo	October 2, 2025	
Super Mario Galaxy 2	Nintendo Software Technology	Nintendo	October 2, 2025	
Super Mario Maker 2	Nintendo EPD	Nintendo	June 28, 2019	
Super Mario Odyssey	Nintendo EPD	Nintendo	October 27, 2017	
Super Mario Party	NDcube	Nintendo	October 5, 2018	
Super Mario Party Jamboree	Nintendo Cube	Nintendo	October 17, 2024	
Super Mario RPG	ArtePiazza	Nintendo	November 17, 2023	
Super Meat Boy	Team Meat	JP: EastAsiaSoft; WW: Team Meat	January 11, 2018	
Super Meat Boy Forever	Team Meat	JP: EastAsiaSoft; WW: Team Meat	December 23, 2020	
Super Mega Baseball 2	Metalhead Software	Metalhead Software	July 25, 2019	
Super Mega Baseball 3	Metalhead Software	Metalhead Software	May 13, 2020	
Super Monkey Ball: Banana Blitz	Sega	Sega	October 29, 2019	
Super Monkey Ball: Banana Mania	Ryu Ga Gotoku Studio	Sega	October 5, 2021	
Super Monkey Ball Banana Rumble	Ryu Ga Gotoku Studio	Sega	June 25, 2024	
Super Neptunia RPG	Artisan Studios	Idea Factory	December 20, 2018	
Super One More Jump	Premo Games	SMG Studio	January 25, 2018	
Super Ping Pong Trick Shot	Sims	Starsign	July 13, 2017	
Super Putty Squad	System 3	System 3	November 9, 2017	
Super Real Mahjong Love 2~7!	MightyCraft	City Connection	April 23, 2020	
Super Real Mahjong PV	MightyCraft	MobyGames	March 14, 2019	
Super Real Mahjong PVI	MightyCraft	MobyGames	May 23, 2019	
Super Real Mahjong PV7	MightyCraft	MobyGames	June 13, 2019	
Super Robot Wars 30	B.B. Studio	Bandai Namco Entertainment	October 28, 2021	
Super Robot Wars T	B.B. Studio	Bandai Namco Entertainment	March 20, 2019	
Super Robot Wars V	B.B. Studio	Bandai Namco Entertainment	October 3, 2019	
Super Robot Wars X	B.B. Studio	Bandai Namco Entertainment	January 10, 2020	
Super Sami Roll	Sonzai Games	Sonzai Games, X Plus	November 4, 2021	
Super Smash Bros. Ultimate	Bandai Namco Studios, Sora Ltd.	Nintendo	December 7, 2018	
Super Woden GP	ViJuDa	Eastasiasoft	November 9, 2022	
Super Zangyura	Glowfish Interactive	Big Sugar	June 10, 2021	
Superbeat: Xonic	Nurijoy	WW: PM Studios; PAL: Rising Star Games	November 21, 2017	
Superbrothers: Sword & Sworcery EP	Capybara Games, Superbrothers	Capybara Games	November 30, 2018	
Superhot	Superhot Team	Superhot Team	August 19, 2019	
Superliminal	Pillow Castle Games	Pillow Castle Games	July 7, 2020	
Supermarket Shriek	Billy Goat Entertainment	PQube	October 23, 2020	
Superola and the Lost Burgers	Undercoders	Undercoders	February 22, 2018	
Supraland	Supra Games	Humble Games	October 22, 2020	
Surgeon Simulator CPR	Bossa Studios	Bossa Studios	September 13, 2018	
The Survivalists	Team17	Team17	October 9, 2020	
Surviving the Aftermath	Iceflake Studios	Paradox Interactive	September 23, 2021	
Susanoh: Japanese Mythology RPG	Hachikuma Games, Onigiri Seisakusho	Mebius	July 29, 2021	
Sushi Striker: The Way of Sushido	indieszero	Nintendo	June 8, 2018	
Suzerain	Torpor Games	Fellow Traveller	December 4, 2020	
Swim Out	Lozange Lab	Lozange Lab	March 20, 2018	
The Swindle	Size Five Games	Curve Digital	September 20, 2018	
Sword Art Online: Alicization Lycoris	Aquria	Bandai Namco Entertainment	September 29, 2022	
Sword Art Online: Fatal Bullet	Dimps	Bandai Namco Entertainment	August 8, 2019	
Sword Art Online: Hollow Realization	Dimps	Bandai Namco Entertainment	April 25, 2019	
The Swords of Ditto: Mormo's Curse	One Bit Beyond	Devolver Digital	May 2, 2019	
Swords & Soldiers II: Shawarmageddon	Ronimo Games	Ronimo Games	March 1, 2019	
Syberia	Koalabs Studio	Microids	October 20, 2017	
Syberia 2	Koalabs Studio	Microids	November 30, 2017	
Syberia 3	Koalabs Studio	Microids	October 18, 2018	
Sympathy Kiss	Design Factory	Idea Factory	November 17, 2022	
Symphonic Rain	Kogado Studio	Kogado Studio	December 12, 2018	
Synaptic Drive	Thousand Games	Yunuo Games	May 28, 2020	
Tabe-O-Ja	Bandai Toys	Bandai Toys	November 28, 2020	
Tadpole Treble Encore	BitFinity	BitFinity	January 21, 2021	
Taiko no Tatsujin: Dokodon! Mystery Adventure	Bandai Namco Studios	Bandai Namco Entertainment	November 26, 2020	
Taiko no Tatsujin: Don to Katsu no Jikū Daibōken	Bandai Namco Studios	Bandai Namco Entertainment	November 26, 2020	
Taiko no Tatsujin: Drum 'n' Fun!	Bandai Namco Studios	Bandai Namco Entertainment	July 19, 2018	
Tails of Iron	Odd Bug Studio	United Label	September 17, 2021	
Taisho x Alice: Heads & Tails	Primula	Prototype	October 29, 2020	
Taishou Mebiusline Taizen	HolicWorks	Dramatic Create	January 28, 2021	
The TakeOver	Pelikan13	Dangen Entertainment	June 4, 2020	
Takorita Meets Fries	Reseverte	Ratalaika Games	October 1, 2021	
Tales from Space: Mutant Blobs Attack	DrinkBox Studios	DrinkBox Studios	May 10, 2019	
Tales of Aravorn: Seasons of the Wolf	Winter Wolves	Ratalaika Games	June 17, 2022	
Tales of Graces f Remastered	Tose	Bandai Namco Entertainment	January 17, 2025	
Tales of Symphonia Remastered	Bandai Namco Entertainment Romania	Bandai Namco Entertainment	February 17, 2023	
Tales of the Shire: A The Lord of the Rings Game	Wētā Workshop	Fictions	July 29, 2025	
Tales of Vesperia	Bandai Namco Studios	Bandai Namco Entertainment	January 11, 2019	
Tallowmere	Chris McFarland	Teyon	November 9, 2017	
The Talos Principle	Croteam	Devolver Digital	December 10, 2019	
Tandem: A Tale of Shadows	Monochrome	Hatinh Interactive	October 21, 2021	
Tangle Tower	SFB Games	SFB Games	October 22, 2019	
Tanzia	Arcanity	Arcanity	July 19, 2018	
The Tartarus Key	Vertical Reach	Armor Games Studios	May 31, 2023	
Tasomachi: Behind the Twilight	Orbital Express	Playism	April 28, 2022	
Tavern Talk	Gentle Troll Entertainment	Gentle Troll Entertainment	June 20, 2024	
Taxi Chaos	Team6 Game Studios	Orange One	February 23, 2021	
Tchia	Awaceb	Awaceb	June 27, 2024	
Team Sonic Racing	Sumo Digital	Sega	May 21, 2019	
Teenage Mutant Ninja Turtles Arcade: Wrath of the Mutants	Raw Thrills, Cradle Games	GameMill Entertainment	April 23, 2024	
Teenage Mutant Ninja Turtles: The Cowabunga Collection	Digital Eclipse	Konami	August 30, 2022	
Teenage Mutant Ninja Turtles: Mutants Unleashed	aheartfulofgames	Outright Games	October 18, 2024	
Teenage Mutant Ninja Turtles: Shredder's Revenge	Tribute Games	Dotemu	June 16, 2022	
Telling Lies	Sam Barlow, Furious Bee	Annapurna Interactive	April 28, 2020	
Temirana: The Lucky Princess and the Tragic Knights	ichicolumn	Idea Factory	April 27, 2023	
Temtem	Crema	Humble Bundle	September 6, 2022	
Tengoku Struggle: Strayside	Idea Factory	Idea Factory	July 28, 2022	
Tennis World Tour	Breakpoint Studio	Bigben Interactive	August 30, 2018	
Tensei Game: Karma x Cross	Any, ArtePiazza	ArtePiazza	August 6, 2026	
Terra Nil	Free Lives	Devolver Digital	December 18, 2023	
Terraria	Pipeworks Studios	JP: Spike Chunsoft; WW: 505 Games	June 27, 2019	
TerraTech	Payload Studios	JP: Teyon; WW: Terra Tek Studios	May 29, 2019	
Terror of Hemasaurus	Digerati	Digerati	January 12, 2023	
Terror Squid	Apt Games	Apt Games	October 15, 2020	
Tesla vs. Lovecraft	10tons	10tons	March 16, 2018	
Teslagrad	Rain Games	JP: Flyhigh Works; WW: Rain Games	November 16, 2017	
Teslagrad 2	Rain Games	Modus Games	April 19, 2023	
Tetris 99	Arika	Nintendo	February 13, 2019	
Tetris Effect: Connected	Monstars	Enhance Games	October 8, 2021	
Tetris Forever	Digital Eclipse	Digital Eclipse	November 12, 2024	
Tetragon	Cafundo Creative Studio	Buka Entertainment	August 12, 2021	
Tetsudo Nippon! Rosen Tabi EX Seiryu Unten Nagaragawa Tetsudo Hen	Sonic Powered	Sonic Powered	August 24, 2023	
Thank Goodness You're Here!	Coal Supper	Panic	August 1, 2024	
Theatrhythm Final Bar Line	indieszero	Square Enix	February 16, 2023	
Thief Simulator	Forever Entertainment	Forever Entertainment	May 16, 2019	
Thimbleweed Park	Terrible Toybox	Terrible Toybox	September 21, 2017	
Thirsty Suitors	Outerloop Games	Annapurna Interactive	November 2, 2023	
This Is the Police	Weappy Studio	THQ Nordic	October 24, 2017	
This Is the Police 2	Weappy Studio	THQ Nordic	September 25, 2018	
This War of Mine	11 Bit Studios	11 Bit Studios	November 27, 2018	
This Way Madness Lies	Zeboyd Games	Zeboyd Games	July 25, 2023	
Thomas & Friends: Wonders of Sodor	Dovetail Games	Dovetail Games	June 9, 2026	
Thomas Was Alone	Mike Bithell Games	Ant Workshop	February 19, 2021	
Thronebreaker: The Witcher Tales	CD Projekt Red	CD Projekt	January 28, 2020	
Through the Darkest of Times	HandyGames	HandyGames	August 13, 2020	
Thumper	Drool	Drool	May 18, 2017	
Thymesia	OverBorder Studio	Team17	August 18, 2022	
Timberman Vs.	Digital Melody	Forever Entertainment	May 3, 2018	
Timelie	Urnique Studio	Urnique Studio, Zordix Publishing	December 15, 2021	
Time Recoil	10tons	10tons	October 26, 2017	
Timespinner	Lunar Ray Games	JP: Dangen Entertainment; WW: Lunar Ray Games	June 4, 2019	
Tin & Kuna	Black River Studios	Aksys Games	September 10, 2020	
Tiny Barbarian DX	StarQuail Games	Nicalis	October 10, 2017	
Tiny Bookshop	Skystone Games	neoludic games	August 7, 2025	
Tiny Metal	Area35	Unties	December 21, 2017	
Tiny Metal: Full Metal Rumble	Area35	Unties	July 11, 2019	
Tiny Troopers: Joint Ops DX	Wired Productions	JP: Cross Function; WW: Wired Productions	December 21, 2017	
Titan Quest	Iron Lore Entertainment	THQ Nordic	July 31, 2018	
To the Moon	X.D. Network	Freebird Games	January 16, 2020	
Toby: The Secret Mine	Lukáš Navrátil	JP: Beep; WW: Headup Games	July 24, 2018	
ToeJam & Earl: Back in the Groove	HumaNature Studios	JP: HumaNature Studios; WW: Adult Swim Games	March 1, 2019	
Toem	Something We Made	Something We Made	September 17, 2021	
Toem 2	Something We Made	Something We Made	September 29, 2026	
Together! The Battle Cats	Ponos	Ponos	December 20, 2018	
Tokei Jikake no Apocalypse	Idea Factory	Idea Factory	April 22, 2021	
Toki	Golgoth Studio	Microïds	December 4, 2018	
Toki Tori	Two Tribes	Two Tribes Publishing	March 30, 2018	
Toki Tori 2+	Two Tribes	Two Tribes	February 23, 2018	
Tokimeki Memorial: Forever With You Emotional	Konami	Konami	May 8, 2025	
Tokimeki Memorial: Girl's Side 4th Heart	Konami	Konami	October 28, 2021	
Tokyo 24-ku: Inoru	HolicWorks	Dramatic Create	March 24, 2022	
Tokyo Dark: Remembrance	Cherrymochi	Unties	November 7, 2019	
Tokyo Mirage Sessions ♯FE Encore	Atlus	Nintendo	January 17, 2020	
Tokyo School Life	M2, Dogenzaka Lab	PQube	February 14, 2019	
Tokyo Xanadu eX+	Nihon Falcom	Aksys Games	June 29, 2023	
Tomodachi Life: Living the Dream	Nintendo	Nintendo	April 16, 2026	
Tomoyo After: It's a Wonderful Life	Key	Prototype	September 10, 2020	
Tonari ni Kanojo no Iru Shiawase: Curious Queen	Prekano	Entergram	October 29, 2020	
Tonari ni Kanojo no Iru Shiawase: Summer Surprise	Prekano	Entergram	May 28, 2020	
Tonight We Riot	Pixel Pushers Local 512	Means Interactive	May 1, 2020	
Tony Hawk's Pro Skater 1 + 2	Vicarious Visions	Activision	June 25, 2021	
Tony Hawk's Pro Skater 3 + 4	Iron Galaxy	Activision	July 11, 2025	
Tools Up!	Knights of Unity	All In! Games	December 3, 2019	
Torchlight II	Panic Button	Runic Games	September 3, 2019	
Torchlight III	Echtra Games	Perfect World Entertainment	October 22, 2020	
Tormented Souls	Dual Effect, Abstract Digital	PQube	April 14, 2022	
Totally Accurate Battle Simulator	Landfall Games	Landfall Games	November 3, 2022	
Totemic	Collage Games	Humble Games	TBA	
Tomb of the Mask	Happymagenta UAB	Playgendary	October 27, 2021	
Tomb Raider I–III Remastered	Aspyr	Aspyr	February 14, 2024	
Tomb Raider IV–VI Remastered	Aspyr	Aspyr	February 14, 2025	
Tomb Raider: Definitive Edition	Crystal Dynamics	Square Enix Europe	November 18, 2025	
Touhou Genso Wanderer: Reloaded	Aqua Style	JP: Unties; WW: NIS America	December 28, 2017	
Touhou Gouyoku Ibun ~ Sunken Fossil World	Twilight Frontier, Team Shanghai Alice	Phoenixx	October 20, 2022	
Touhou Hyoibana: Antinomy of Common Flowers	Twilight Frontier	Team Shanghai Alice	April 22, 2021	
Touhou Kobuto V: Burst Battle	Cubetype	JP: Nippon Ichi Software; WW: NIS America	October 10, 2017	
Touhou Luna Nights	Team Ladybug	Phoenixx	December 17, 2020	
Touhou Sky Arena: Matsuri Climax	Area Zero	Area Zero	February 14, 2019	
Touhou Spell Bubble	Taito	Taito	February 6, 2020	
Touken Ranbu Warriors	Omega Force, Ruby Party	JP: DMM Games; WW: Koei Tecmo	February 17, 2022	
The Touryst	Shin'en Multimedia	Shin'en Multimedia	November 21, 2019	
Tousouchuu: Great Mission	D3 Publisher	D3 Publisher	July 4, 2024	
Tousouchuu: Hunter VS Tousousha! Kimi wa Dotchi de Shōri Dekiru ka!?	D3 Publisher	D3 Publisher	December 4, 2025	
Towaware no Palm: Refrain	Capcom	Capcom	March 12, 2020	
Tower of Time	Event Horizon	Digerati	June 25, 2020	
TowerFall	Matt Makes Games	Matt Makes Games	September 27, 2018	
Townscaper	Oskar Stålberg	Oskar Stålberg	August 26, 2021	
Toy Soldiers HD	Signal Studios	Accelerate Games	December 31, 2022	
Toy Story 3: Complete Edition	Digital Eclipse	Atari	October 15, 2026	
Toy Story: Retro Roundup!	Digital Eclipse	Atari	October 15, 2026	
Traditional Tactics Ne	Daidai	Daidai	September 20, 2019	
Trails in the Sky 1st Chapter	Nihon Falcom	NA: GungHo Online Entertainment; EU: Clear River Games	September 19, 2025	
Trails in the Sky 2nd Chapter	Nihon Falcom	NA: GungHo Online Entertainment; EU: Clear River Games	September 17, 2026	
Trailblazers	Supergonk	Rising Star Games	May 15, 2018	
Transformers: Battlegrounds	Coatsink	Outright Games	October 23, 2020	
Transformers: Galactic Trials	3DClouds	Outright Games	October 11, 2024	
Transformers: Earthspark — Expedition	Tessera Studios	Outright Games	October 13, 2023	
Transistor	Supergiant Games	Supergiant Games	November 1, 2018	
Trash Quest	Nupixo Games	RedDeerGames	December 9, 2021	
Travis Strikes Again: No More Heroes	Grasshopper Manufacture	Grasshopper Manufacture	January 18, 2019	
Treachery in Beatdown City	Nuchallenger	Nuchallenger	March 31, 2020	
Treadnauts	Topstitch Games	Topstitch Games	August 17, 2018	
Treasurenauts	Atooi	Atooi	TBA	
Trek to Yomi	Flying Wild Hog	Devolver Digital	January 30, 2023	
Trials of Mana	Square Enix	Square Enix	April 24, 2020	
Trials Rising	Ubisoft	Ubisoft	February 26, 2019	
Triangle Strategy	Artdink, Netchubiyori	Square Enix, Nintendo	March 4, 2022	
Tricky Towers	WeirdBeard	WeirdBeard	October 11, 2018	
Trifox	Glowfish Interactive	Big Sugar	October 13, 2022	
Trigger Witch	Rainbite	EastAsiaSoft	July 29, 2021	
Trine: Enchanted Edition	Frozenbyte	Frozenbyte	November 9, 2018	
Trine 2: Complete Story	Frozenbyte	Frozenbyte	February 18, 2019	
Trine 3: The Artifacts of Power	Frozenbyte	Frozenbyte	July 29, 2019	
Trine 4: The Nightmare Prince	Frozenbyte	Modus Games	October 8, 2019	
Troll and I	Spiral House	Maximum Games	August 14, 2017	
Trollhunters: Defenders of Arcadia	WayForward	Outright Games	September 25, 2020	
Tron: Catalyst	Bithell Games	Big Fan Games	June 17, 2025	
Tron: Identity	Bithell Games	Bithell Games	April 11, 2023	
Tropico 6	Limbic Entertainment	JP: Square Enix; WW: Kalypso Media	November 6, 2020	
TroubleDays	Qureate	Qureate	July 9, 2020	
Trouble Magia: Wakeari Shoujo wa Mirai o Kachitoru Tame ni Ikoku no Mahou Gakkou e Ryougaku Shimasu	Otomate	Idea Factory	September 12, 2024	
Trover Saves the Universe	Squanch Games	Squanch Games	November 28, 2019	
Truck Driver	Triangle Studios	Soedesco	November 16, 2020	
Tsukihime: A Piece of Blue Glass Moon	Type-Moon	Aniplex	August 26, 2021	
TumbleSeed	Benedict Fritz	aeiowu	May 2, 2017	
Tunche	Leap Game Studios	HypeTrain Digital	March 2, 2021	
Tunic	Isometricorp Games	Finji	September 27, 2022	
The Turing Test	Bulkhead Interactive	Square Enix	February 7, 2020	
Turnip Boy Commits Tax Evasion	Snoozy Kazoo	Graffiti Games	April 22, 2021	
Turnip Boy Robs a Bank	Snoozy Kazoo	Graffiti Games	January 18, 2024	
Turrican Anthology Vol. I	Factor 5	Strictly Limited Games	July 29, 2022	
Turrican Anthology Vol. II	Factor 5	Strictly Limited Games	July 29, 2022	
Turrican Flashback	Factor 5	Inin Games	December 8, 2020	
Turok: Dinosaur Hunter	Nightdive Studios	Nightdive Studios	March 18, 2019	
Turok 2: Seeds of Evil	Nightdive Studios	Nightdive Studios	August 9, 2019	
TurtlePop: Journey to Freedom	Zengami	Digipen Game Studios	March 8, 2018	
Twelve Minutes	Luís António	Annapurna Interactive	December 7, 2021	
Twin Robots: Ultimate Edition	Thinice Games	Ratalaika Games	February 23, 2018	
Two Point Campus	Two Point Studios	Sega	August 9, 2022	
Two Point Hospital	Two Point Studios	Sega	February 25, 2020	
Ty the Tasmanian Tiger HD	Krome Studios	Krome Studios	March 31, 2020	
Ty the Tasmanian Tiger 2: Bush Rescue HD	Krome Studios	Krome Studios	March 30, 2021	
Type:Rider	Agat Films & Cie - Ex Nihilo	BulkyPix, Arte	April 25, 2019	
Typoman	Brainseed Factory	JP: Flyhigh Works; WW: Wales Interactive	February 22, 2018	
UFO 50	Mossmouth, LLC	Mossmouth, LLC	August 7, 2025	
Ugly	Team Ugly	Graffiti Games	September 14, 2023	
UglyDolls: An Imperfect Adventure	Ugly Industries Holdings	Outright Games	April 26, 2019	
Ultimate Chicken Horse	Clever Endeavour Games	Clever Endeavour Games	September 25, 2018	
Ultra Age	Next Stage, Visual Dart	Dangen Entertainment, Intragames	September 9, 2021	
Ultra Hyperball	Springloaded	Springloaded	July 28, 2017	
Ultra Kaiju Monster Rancher	Koei Tecmo	Bandai Namco Entertainment	October 20, 2022	
Ultra Street Fighter II: The Final Challengers	Capcom	Capcom	May 26, 2017	
Ultracore	Digital Illusions	Inin Games, Strictly Limited Games	June 23, 2020	
Umihara Kawase BaZooKa	Studio Saizensen	Success	May 28, 2020	
Umihara Kawase Fresh!	Studio Saizensen	Success	April 25, 2019	
Umineko When They Cry Saku: Nekobako to Musou no Koukyoukyoku	07th Expansion	Entergram	January 28, 2021	
Umurangi Generation	Origame Digital	Playism	June 5, 2021	
Unavowed	Wadjet Eye Games	Wadjet Eye Games	July 7, 2021	
Unbound: Worlds Apart	Alien Pixel Studios	Alien Pixel Studios	July 28, 2021	
The Uncertain: Last Quiet Day	New Game Order	Postmeta	March 3, 2022	
The Uncertain: Light at the End	New Game Order	Meta Publishing	TBA	
UnderMine	Thorium	Thorium	February 11, 2021	
Undernauts: Labyrinth of Yomi	Experience	JP: Experience; WW: Aksys Games	October 15, 2020	
Under Night In-Birth Exe:Late cl-r	French Bread	Arc System Works	February 20, 2020	
Undertale	8-4	8-4	September 15, 2018	
Underworld Dreams	Drop of Pixel	Drop of Pixel	TBA	
Undusted: Letters from the Past	Toge Productions	5minlab Corp.	October 16, 2025	
Unepic	Francisco Téllez de Meneses	Ninagamers	December 15, 2017	
Unexplored: Unlocked Edition	Ludomotion	Digerati	August 9, 2018	
Unforeseen Incidents	Backwoods Entertainment	Application Systems Heidelberg	January 27, 2022	
Unicorn Overlord	Vanillaware	JP: Atlus; WW: Sega	March 8, 2024	
Un:Logical	LicoBiTs	Broccoli	January 22, 2026	
UnMetal	Francisco Téllez de Meneses	Versus Evil	September 28, 2021	
Uno	Ubisoft	Ubisoft	November 7, 2017	
Unpacking	Witch Beam	Humble Bundle	November 2, 2021	
Unrailed!	Indoor Astronaut	Daedalic Entertainment	September 23, 2020	
Unravel Two	Coldwood Interactive	Electronic Arts	March 22, 2019	
Unreal Life	Hako Seikatsu	Hako Seikatsu	May 14, 2020	
Unruly Heroes	Magic Design Studios	Magic Design Studios	January 23, 2019	
Unsighted	Studio Pixel Punk	Humble Games	September 30, 2021	
Unsung Story	Little Orbit	Little Orbit	TBA	
Untitled Goose Game	House House	Panic	September 20, 2019	
Urban Myth Dissolution Center	Hakababunko	Shueisha Games	February 13, 2025	
Urban Trial Playground	Teyon	Tate Interactive	April 5, 2018	
Use Your Words	Smiling Buddha Games	Screenwave Media	August 3, 2017	
Uta no Prince-sama: Amazing Aria	Broccoli	Broccoli	May 20, 2020	
Uta no Prince-sama Debut	Broccoli	Broccoli	February 25, 2021	
Uta no Prince-sama: Sweet Serenade	Broccoli	Broccoli	May 20, 2020	
Uta to Mori no Youkai Yashiki	PiXEL	PiXEL	July 10, 2025	
Utakata no Uchronia: Trail	LicoBiTs	Broccoli	July 24, 2025	
V-Rally 4	Kylotonn	Bigben Interactive	December 13, 2018	
VA-11 Hall-A: Cyberpunk Bartender Action	Sukeban Games	JP: Playism; WW: Ysbryd Games	May 2, 2019	
Sword of the Vagrant	Dico	Rainy Frog	December 1, 2022	
Valfaris	Steel Mantis	JP: EastAsiaSoft; WW: Merge Games	October 10, 2019	
Valiant Hearts: The Great War	Ubisoft Montpellier	Ubisoft	November 8, 2018	
ValiDate: Struggling Singles in Your Area	Veritable Joy Studios	Veritable Joy Studios	October 13, 2022	
Valis: The Fantasm Soldier Collection	Edia	Edia	December 9, 2021	
Valkyria Chronicles	Sega	Sega	September 27, 2018	
Valkyria Chronicles 4	Sega	Sega	September 25, 2018	
Valley	Blue Isle Studios	Blue Isle Studios	March 7, 2019	
Valthirian Arc: Hero School Story	Agate	JP: Rainy Frog; WW: PQube	October 2, 2018	
Vambrace: Cold Soul	Devespresso Games	Chorus Worldwide, Headup Games	August 29, 2019	
Vampire: The Masquerade – Coteries of New York	Draw Distance	Draw Distance	March 24, 2020	
Vampire: The Masquerade – Shadows of New York	Draw Distance	JP: DMM Games; WW: Draw Distance	September 10, 2020	
Vampire: The Masquerade – Swansong	Big Bad Wolf	Nacon	September 28, 2023	
Vampire's Fall: Origins	Early Morning Studio	Early Morning Studio	September 17, 2020	
Vampyr	Focus Home Interactive	JP: Game Source Entertainment; WW: Dontnod Entertainment	October 29, 2019	
The Vanishing of Ethan Carter	Astronauts	Astronauts	August 15, 2019	
Vaporum: Lockdown	Fatbot Games	JP: Fatbot Games; WW: Merge Games	March 22, 2021	
Vasara HD Collection	QUByte Interactive	JP: Chorus Worldwide; WW: QUByte Interactive	August 15, 2019	
Vegas Party	Raylight Studios	Funbox Media	June 21, 2018	
Velocity 2X	FuturLab	Curve Digital	September 20, 2018	
Vera Blanc: Full Moon	Winter Wolves	Ratalaika Games	November 13, 2020	
Victor Vran	Haemimont Games	Wired Productions	August 28, 2018	
Vigil: The Longest Night	Glass Heart Games	Another Indie	October 14, 2020	
Vigor	Bohemia Interactive	Bohemia Interactive	July 8, 2020	
Virche Evermore: Epic Lycoris	HYDE	Aksys Games	September 7, 2023	
Virgo Versus the Zodiac	Moonana	Serenity Forge	August 23, 2023	
Virtual Ties Isekaijoucho Träumerei	Entergram	Kamitsubaki Studio	March 19, 2026	
Vitamin Connection	WayForward	WayForward	February 20, 2020	
Vivid Knight	Asobism	Asobism	December 16, 2021	
Voez	Rayark Games, Esquadra	Flyhigh Works	March 3, 2017	
Voice of Cards: The Forsaken Maiden	Alim	Square Enix	February 17, 2022	
Voice of Cards: The Isle Dragon Roars	Alim	Square Enix	October 28, 2021	
Void Bastards	Blue Manchu	Humble Bundle	May 7, 2020	
Void Terrarium	Nippon Ichi Software	JP: Nippon Ichi Software; WW: NIS America	January 23, 2020	
Volgarr the Viking	Crazy Viking Studios	Crazy Viking Studios	October 5, 2017	
Volta-X	GungHo Online Entertainment	GungHo Online Entertainment	August 12, 2020	
Vostok Inc.	Nosebleed Interactive	Wired Productions	December 7, 2017	
Vroom in the Night Sky	Poisoft	Poisoft	March 3, 2017	
VVVVVV	Terry Cavanagh	JP: Pikii; WW: Nicalis	November 17, 2017	
Wagamama High Spec	Madosoft	iMel	September 24, 2020	
Waifu Uncovered	One Hand Free Studios	EastAsiaSoft	July 16, 2020	
The Walking Dead: The Complete First Season	Telltale Games	Telltale Games	August 7, 2018	
The Walking Dead: Season Two	Telltale Games	Telltale Games	January 21, 2020	
The Walking Dead: A New Frontier	Telltale Games	Telltale Games	January 21, 2020	
The Walking Dead: The Final Season	Telltale Games	Telltale Games	August 12, 2018	
Wan Nyan Doubutsu Byouin: Pet o Tasukeru Daiji-na Oshigoto	Nippon Columbia	Nippon Columbia	July 2, 2020	
Wandersong	Greg Lobanov	Humble Bundle	September 27, 2018	
The War of Genesis: Remnants of Gray	Pillow Castle Games	Pillow Castle Games	December 22, 2023	
The Wardrobe	C.I.N.I.C. Games	NA: Adventure Productions; PAL: MixedBag	July 6, 2018	
Warface	Allods Team	My.com	February 18, 2020	
Warframe	Digital Extremes, Panic Button	Digital Extremes	November 20, 2018	
Wargroove	Chucklefish	Chucklefish	February 1, 2019	
Warhammer 40,000: Mechanicus	Bulwark Studios	Kasedo Games	July 17, 2020	
Warhammer 40,000: Shootas, Blood and Teef	Rogueside	Rogueside	October 20, 2022	
Warhammer 40,000: Space Wolf	HeroCraft	HeroCraft	January 23, 2020	
Warhammer Age of Sigmar: Champions	Games Workshop	Playfusion	April 16, 2019	
Warhammer Quest	Rodeo Games	Chilled Mouse	February 26, 2019	
Warhammer Quest 2: The End Times	Perchang Games	Chilled Mouse	December 23, 2019	
WarioWare: Get It Together!	Intelligent Systems, Nintendo EPD	Nintendo	September 10, 2021	
WarioWare: Move It!	Intelligent Systems, Nintendo EPD	Nintendo	November 3, 2023	
Warriors Orochi 3 Ultimate	Omega Force	Koei Tecmo	November 9, 2017	
Warriors Orochi 4	Omega Force	Koei Tecmo	September 27, 2018	
Warriors Orochi 4 Ultimate	Omega Force	Koei Tecmo	December 19, 2019	
Warsaw	Pixelated Milk, Crunching Koalas	Gaming Company	October 1, 2020	
Wartales	Shiro Games	Shiro Unlimited	September 14, 2023	
Wasteland 2: Director's Cut	inXile Entertainment	inXile Entertainment	September 13, 2018	
The Watchmaker	Micropsia Games	BadLand Publishing	October 8, 2020	
The Way Remastered	Sonka	Sonka	April 20, 2018	
We Are OFK	Team OFK	Team OFK	August 18, 2022	
Well Dweller	Kyle Thompson	Top Hat Studios	2026	
Werewolf: The Apocalypse – Heart of the Forest	Different Tales	Walkabout Games	January 7, 2021	
West of Dead	Upstream Arcade	Raw Fury	August 26, 2020	
West of Loathing	Asymmetric Publications	Asymmetric Publications	May 31, 2018	
What the Golf?	Triband	Triband	May 21, 2020	
What Lies in the Multiverse	Studio Voyager, IguanaBee	Untold Tales	March 4, 2022	
What Remains of Edith Finch	Giant Sparrow	Annapurna Interactive	July 4, 2019	
Wheel of Fortune	Ubisoft	Ubisoft	October 30, 2018	
Wheels of Aurelia	Santa Ragione	MixedBag	November 2, 2017	
When the Past Was Around	Toge Productions, Mojiken Studio	Chorus Worldwide	December 15, 2020	
When Ski Lifts Go Wrong	Hugecalf Studios	JP: Digital Bards; WW: Curve Digital	January 23, 2019	
Where Cards Fall	The Game Band	Snowman	November 4, 2021	
Where the Water Tastes Like Wine	Dim Bulb Games, Serenity Forge	Serenity Forge	November 29, 2019	
Whispering Willows	Night Light Interactive	Akupara Games	September 27, 2018	
White Girl	Otorakobo	Otorakobo	September 2, 2021	
Who Wants to Be a Millionaire?	Appeal Studios	Microids	October 29, 2020	
The Wild at Heart	Moonlight Kids	Humble Games	November 16, 2021	
Wild Bastards	Blue Manchu	Maximum Entertainment	September 12, 2024	
Wildfrost	Deadpan Games	Chucklefish	April 12, 2023	
Wild Guns Reloaded	Natsume Atari	JP: Natsume Atari; WW: Natsume Inc.	April 17, 2018	
Wilmot's Warehouse	Finji	Finji	August 29, 2019	
Windbound	5 Lives Studios	Deep Silver	August 28, 2020	
Windjammers	Dotemu	Dotemu	October 23, 2018	
Windjammers 2	Dotemu	Dotemu	January 20, 2022	
Windscape	Magic Sandbox	Headup Games	March 27, 2019	
Wing of Darkness	Production Exabilities	Clouded Leopard Entertainment	June 3, 2021	
Wing of the Asteria	Pixel	Pixel	TBA	
Wingspan	Monster Couch	Monster Couch	December 29, 2020	
Winning Post 8 2017	Koei Tecmo	Koei Tecmo	September 14, 2017	
Winning Post 8 2018	Koei Tecmo	Koei Tecmo	March 15, 2018	
Winning Post 9	Koei Tecmo	Koei Tecmo	March 28, 2019	
Winning Post 9 2020	Koei Tecmo	Koei Tecmo	March 12, 2020	
Winning Post 9 2021	Koei Tecmo	Koei Tecmo	April 15, 2021	
Winning Post 9 2022	Koei Tecmo	Koei Tecmo	April 14, 2022	
Wintermoor Tactics Club	EVC	Versus Evil	September 10, 2020	
Winter Burrow	Pine Creek Games	Noodlecake	November 12, 2025	
Witch and Hero	RSF, Flyhigh Works	Flyhigh Works	March 21, 2019	
Witch and Hero II	RSF, Flyhigh Works	Flyhigh Works	December 19, 2019	
Witch on the Holy Night	Type-Moon	Aniplex	December 8, 2022	
The Witch's House MV	Fummy	Dangen Entertainment	October 13, 2022	
WitchSpring3 Re:Fine – The Story of Eirudy	Kiwi Walks	G Choice, Artdink	December 17, 2020	
The Witcher 3: Wild Hunt	Saber Interactive	CD Projekt Red	October 15, 2019	
Wizard of Legend	Contingent99	Humble Bundle	May 15, 2018	
Wizard's Symphony	Arc System Works	Arc System Works	February 28, 2019	
Wizard with a Gun	Galvanic Games	Devolver Digital	October 17, 2023	
Wobbledogs	Animal Uprising	Secret Mode	November 17, 2022	
The Wolf Among Us Remastered	Telltale Games	PM Studios	TBA	
Wolfenstein II: The New Colossus	MachineGames	Bethesda Softworks	June 29, 2018	
Wolfenstein: Youngblood	MachineGames	Bethesda Softworks	July 26, 2019	
Wolfstride	OTA IMON Studio	Raw Fury	May 10, 2022	
Wonder Boy: Asha in Monster World	Artdink	JP: G Choice; WW: Inin Games	April 22, 2021	
Wonder Boy: The Dragon's Trap	Lizardcube	Dotemu	April 18, 2017	
Wonder Boy Returns Remix	CFK	Sega	May 23, 2019	
The Wonderful 101: Remastered	PlatinumGames	PlatinumGames	May 19, 2020	
Woodle Tree 2: Deluxe	Chubby Pixel	Chubby Pixel	July 25, 2019	
Woodsalt	Team Woodsalt	Team Woodsalt	December 9, 2020	
Working Zombies	Jupiter Corporation	Jupiter Corporation	June 18, 2020	
World-Wide Adventure! Collection 2	PLiCY	PLiCY	December 19, 2019	
World End Syndrome	Toybox Games	Arc System Works	August 30, 2018	
The World Ends with You: Final Remix	Jupiter Corporation, Square Enix	Square Enix	September 27, 2018	
World of Final Fantasy Maxima	Tose	Square Enix	November 6, 2018	
World of Goo	2D Boy	Tomorrow Corporation	March 16, 2017	
World of Horror	Panstasz	Ysbryd Games	October 26, 2023	
World of Tanks Blitz	Wargaming	Wargaming	August 26, 2020	
World for Two	Seventh Rank	Room6	September 16, 2020	
World to the West	Rain Games	JP: Flyhigh Works; WW: Rain Games	January 18, 2018	
WorldNeverland: Elnea Kingdom	Althi	Althi	March 15, 2018	
World's End Club	Too Kyo Games	Izanagi Games	May 27, 2021	
World War Z	Saber Interactive	Mad Dog Games	November 2, 2021	
Worms Armageddon: Anniversary Edition	Team17	Team17	September 26, 2024	
Worms Rumble	Team17	Team17	June 23, 2021	
Worms W.M.D	Team17	Team17	November 23, 2017	
Wrath: Aeon of Ruin	KillPixel Games	3D Realms, 1C Entertainment	February 25, 2021	
WRC 8	Kylotonn Games	Bigben Interactive	November 14, 2019	
WRC 9	Kylotonn Games	Nacon	March 11, 2021	
WRC 10	Kylotonn Games	Nacon	March 17, 2022	
Wreckfest	Bugbear Entertainment	THQ Nordic	June 21, 2022	
Wrestling Empire	MDickie	MDickie	January 11, 2021	
WWE 2K Battlegrounds	Saber Interactive	JP: Take-Two Interactive; WW: 2K Sports	September 18, 2020	
WWE 2K18	Yuke's, Visual Concepts	2K Sports	December 6, 2017	
Wytchwood	Alientrap	Whitethorn Games, Whisper Games	December 9, 2021	
Xiaomei and the Flame Dragon's Fist	PiXEL	Leoful	March 31, 2023	
Xcom 2 Collection	Firaxis Games	2K Games	May 29, 2020	
Xenoblade Chronicles: Definitive Edition	Monolith Soft	Nintendo	May 29, 2020	
Xenoblade Chronicles 2	Monolith Soft	Nintendo	December 1, 2017	
Xenoblade Chronicles 2: Torna – The Golden Country	Monolith Soft	Nintendo	September 14, 2018	
Xenoblade Chronicles 3	Monolith Soft	Nintendo	July 29, 2022	
Xenoblade Chronicles X: Definitive Edition	Monolith Soft	Nintendo	March 20, 2025	
Xeno Crisis	Bitmap Bureau	Bitmap Bureau	October 28, 2018	
Xenon Racer	3D Clouds	Soedesco	March 26, 2019	
Xeodrifter	Atooi	Atooi	February 15, 2018	
XIII	PlayMagic	Microids	September 13, 2022	
Xtreme Sports	WayForward	WayForward	August 15, 2023	
Yaga	Breadcrumbs Interactive	Versus Evil	November 12, 2019	
Yakuza Kiwami	Ryu Ga Gotoku Studio	Sega	October 24, 2024	
Yars: Recharged	Adamvision Studios	Atari	August 23, 2022	
Yars Rising	WayForward	Atari	September 10, 2024	
Yeah! You Want "Those Games," Right? So Here You Go! Now, Let's See You Clear Them!	Monkeycraft	D3 Publisher	July 19, 2023	
Yeah! You Want "Those Games," Right? So Here You Go! Now, Let's See You Clear Them! 2	Monkeycraft	D3 Publisher	July 17, 2024	
Yes, Your Grace	Brave at Night	No More Robots	June 26, 2020	
Yesterday Origins	Pendulo Studios	Microids	May 31, 2018	
YesterMorrow	Bitmap Galaxy	JP: Orenda; WW: Blowfish Studios	November 5, 2020	
YIIK: A Postmodern RPG	Ackk Studios	Ackk Studios	January 17, 2019	
Yo-kai Watch	Level-5	Level-5	October 10, 2019	
Yo-kai Watch 4	Level-5	Level-5	June 20, 2019	
Yo-kai Academy Y	Level-5	Level-5	August 13, 2020	
Yobarai Detective: Miasma Breaker	Mebius	Mebius	January 16, 2025	
Yōdanji	Kemco	Kemco	December 7, 2017	
Yoiyami Dreamer: Voice of the Dreambringer	Tripper Room	Mediascape	July 25, 2019	
Yoku's Island Express	Villa Gorilla	Team17	May 29, 2018	
Yomawari 3	Nippon Ichi Software	Nippon Ichi Software	April 21, 2022	
Yomawari: The Long Night Collection	Nippon Ichi Software	NIS America	October 25, 2018	
Yonder: The Cloud Catcher Chronicles	Prideful Sloth	Prideful Sloth	May 17, 2018	
Yono and the Celestial Elephants	Neckbolt Games	Neckbolt Games	October 12, 2017	
Yooka-Laylee	Playtonic Games	Team17	December 14, 2017	
Yooka-Laylee and the Impossible Lair	Playtonic Games	Team17	October 8, 2019	
Yoru, Tomosu	Nippon Ichi Software	Nippon Ichi Software	July 30, 2020	
Yoshi's Crafted World	Good-Feel	Nintendo	March 29, 2019	
Youropa	Frecle	Frecle	October 6, 2022	
Ys Origin	Nihon Falcom	Nihon Falcom	October 1, 2020	
Ys Memoire: The Oath in Felghana	Nihon Falcom	Nihon Falcom	April 27, 2023	
Ys VIII: Lacrimosa of Dana	Nihon Falcom	JP: Nippon Ichi Software; WW: NIS America	June 26, 2018	
Ys IX: Monstrum Nox	Nihon Falcom	JP: Nippon Ichi Software; WW: NIS America	July 6, 2021	
Ys X: Nordics	Nihon Falcom	JP: Nippon Ichi Software; WW: NIS America	September 28, 2023	
Yu-Gi-Oh! Legacy of the Duelist: Link Evolution	Konami	Konami	April 25, 2019	
Yu-Gi-Oh! Master Duel	Konami	Konami	January 18, 2022	
Yu-Gi-Oh! Rush Duel: Dawn of the Battle Royale	Konami	Konami	August 12, 2021	
Yu-no: A Girl Who Chants Love at the Bound of This World	5pb.	JP: 5pb.; WW: Spike Chunsoft	March 14, 2019	
Yume Nikki: Dream Diary	Active Gaming Media	Active Gaming Media	February 21, 2019	
Yumeutsutsu Re:Master	Kogado Studio	JP: Kogado Studio; WW: Degica Games	April 23, 2020	
Yunohana Spring! Mellow Times	Design Factory	Idea Factory	February 28, 2019	
Yuppie Psycho: Executive Edition	Baroque Decay	Another Indie	October 29, 2020	
Yurukill: The Calumniation Games	G.Rev	JP: Izanagi Games; WW: NIS America	May 26, 2022	
Yuukyuu Gensoukyoku Revival	VRIDGE	Taito	December 18, 2025	
Zengeon	IndieLeague Studio	PQube	August 6, 2021	
Zen Bound 2	Secret Exit	Secret Exit	May 24, 2018	
ZenWash	Game Nacional	Game Nacional	December 27, 2025	
Zero to Dance Hero	SmileBoom	Imagineer	December 21, 2023	
Ziggurat	Milkstone Studios	Milkstone Studios	July 5, 2019	
Zoids Wild: Blast Unleashed	Eighting	JP: Takara Tomy; WW: Outright Games	February 28, 2019	
Zoids Wild: Infinity Blast	Takara Tomy	Takara Tomy	November 26, 2020	
Zombie Army 4: Dead War	Rebellion Developments	Rebellion Developments	April 29, 2022	
Zombie Army Trilogy	Rebellion Developments	Rebellion Developments	March 31, 2020	
Zombie Driver: Immortal Edition	Exor Studios	JP: Digital Bards; WW: Exor Studios	July 25, 2019	
Zombieland: Double Tap – Road Trip	High Voltage Software	NA: GameMill Entertainment; EU: Maximum Games	October 15, 2019	
Zombies Ate My Neighbors	Dotemu	Lucasfilm Games	June 29, 2021	
Zorya: The Celestial Sisters	MadLife Divertissment	TLM Partners	February 8, 2022	
Zumba: Burn it Up!	Kuju Games	505 Games	November 19, 2019	
