= Wardrobe (disambiguation) =

A wardrobe is a cabinet used for storing clothes.

Wardrobe or Wardrobes may also refer to:

- Wardrobe (clothing), a full set of multiple clothing items, particularly in the acting professions
- Wardrobe (government), part of royal administration in medieval England
- Wardrobe (museum), a military museum in Salisbury
- Wardrobe stylist, someone who picks out the clothing worn by celebrities, models or other public figures
- Wardrobe supervisor, in theatre, the person responsible for supervising all wardrobe related activities
- Royal Wardrobe, a building destroyed in the Great Fire of London of 1666
- Mick Wardrobe (born 1962), English association football player
- Papa Bouba Diop (born 1978), Senegalese football player nicknamed "The Wardrobe"
- The Wardrobe (video game), a 2017 video game
- Wardrobe, a character in Disney's 1991 animated film Beauty and the Beast
- Wardrobes, a hamlet in Lacey Green, Buckinghamshire, England

== See also ==
- Cabinet (furniture)
