= Sparkle 3 Genesis =

2015 video game

- Developers: Madman Theory Games; Plastic Games
- Publisher: Forever Entertainment
- Platforms: Microsoft Windows, macOS, Linux, Nintendo Switch
- Release: April 24, 2015; Nintendo Switch: WW: March 15, 2018; JP: September 26, 2019
- Genre: Arcade
- Mode: Single-player

Sparkle 3 Genesis (stylized as The Sparkle³ genesis) is an arcade-style video game. It is the second title in Forever Entertainment's Sparkle series of video games and the successor of the 2011 video game Sparkle 2 Evo and the predecessor of the 2016 video game Sparkle Zero.

== Development ==
Sparkle 3 Genesis was developed by Madman Theory Games in collaboration with Plastic Games and published by Polish video game development studio Forever Entertainment on April 24, 2015, for Microsoft Windows, macOS, and Linux. The game was ported to Nintendo Switch and released on March 15, 2018, in the west and on September 26, 2019, in Japan.

== Gameplay ==
The gameplay of Sparkle 3 Genesis is very similar to that of its predecessor. In the game, the player controls the title creature, a microorganism, as it swims through something fluid. It can eat food which influences how it will evolve and attack enemies with its teeth. The more it eats, the further it will evolve. The goal of the game is to involve as far as possible. It features new missions compared to its predecessor.

== Reception ==
Sparkle 3 Genesis received average reviews, criticizing its simplicity and praising its graphics.

Reception

Review scores
Publication	Score
ntower	5/10
switchplayer.net	2.5/5

German online video game magazine ntower gave the game 5 out of 10 points, and wrote: "[...] Das Gameplay ist extrem simpel gehalten, im Gegensatz zum Vorgänger gibt es jedoch immerhin kleinere Missionen. Visuell ist Sparkle 3 Genesis recht ansprechend und dient vor allem Dingen einem Zweck: Sich zu entspannen. [...]" (" [...] The gameplay is extremely simple, however, in contrast to the predecessor, there are at least small missions. Visually, Sparkle 3 Genesis is quite appealing and serves one purpose above all: to relax. [...]").

Online video game magazine switchplayer.net gave the game 2.5 out of 5 stars, and wrote: "[The game] is a kind of contemplative experience that puts you in control of an ever-evolving creature. Unfortunately, it lacks variety and sounds more like a mini-game stretched out to become longer and, consequently, tedious."
