= Sparkle 2 Evo =

2011 video game

- Developers: Madman Theory Games; Plastic Games
- Publisher: Forever Entertainment
- Platforms: Linux, macOS, Nintendo Switch, PlayStation 4, Windows
- Release: November 29, 2011; Nintendo Switch; November 2, 2017; PlayStation 4 May 20, 2021
- Genres: Logic, arcade
- Mode: Single-player

Sparkle 2 Evo (stylized as The Sparkle² evo or Sparkle 2 EVO) is an indie logic arcade-style video game. It is the first title in Forever Entertainment's Sparkle series of video games and the predecessor of the 2015 video game Sparkle 3 Genesis.

== Development ==
Sparkle 2 Evo was developed by Madman Theory Games in collaboration with Plastic Games and published by Polish video game development studio Forever Entertainment on November 29, 2011, for Microsoft Windows, macOS, and Linux. On November 2, 2017, the game was ported on Nintendo Switch.

== Gameplay ==
Sparkle 2 Evo takes place underwater. The player controls the title creature, a microorganism. It can eat food which influences how it will evolve. The more it eats, the further it will evolve. The goal of the game is to evolve as far as possible. There are different levels in which the player can move around and rise up or sink into the depths.

The game features two modes:

The first mode is about competing against another microorganism, played by an AI.

The second is an experimental mode in which the player can eat food without competing against another player.

== Reception ==
Sparkle 2 Evo received average reviews, criticizing its simplicity and praising its graphics.

Reception

Review scores
Publication	Score
Bonus Stage	6/10
Nintendo Life	5/10
ntower	5/10
Switch Player	2.5/5

Bonus Stage gave the game 6 out of 10 points and said, "[...] the AI is pretty incompetent" and Sparkle 2 Evo "[...] has a lot of cool design and graphical appeal".

Nintendo Life gave the game 5 out of 10 points, and said the game "feels like a proof of concept that isn't given the push it needs to be something more engaging and impactful."

German online video game magazine ntower gave the game 5 out of 10 points and wrote: "[...] Das Gameplay ist extrem simpel gehalten, wirkliche Herausforderungen gibt es nicht. Visuell ist Sparkle 2 EVO jedoch recht ansprechend und dient vor allem Dingen einem Zweck: Sich zu entspannen. [...]" (" [...] The gameplay is extremely simple, there are no real challenges. Visually, however, Sparkle 2 EVO is quite appealing and serves one purpose above all: to relax. [...]").

Switch Player described the game as "uninspired" and found the gameplay "uncompelling", giving it a 2.5/5.

== Successors ==
Sparkle 2 Evo spawned several successors: Sparkle 3 Genesis (2015), Sparkle Zero (2016), and Sparkle 4 Tales (2020).
