= Sword of the Vagrant =

2017 video game

- Developer: O.T.K Games
- Publishers: SakuraGame (Windows); Rainy Frog LLC (consoles)
- Engine: Unreal Engine 4
- Platforms: Windows, Nintendo Switch, PlayStation 4, Xbox One, Xbox Series X/S
- Release: June 9, 2017 (Windows); December 1, 2022 (consoles)
- Genres: Hack and slash, role-playing video game
- Mode: Single-player

Sword of the Vagrant (titled The Vagrant for PC only) is a hack and slash side-scrolling role-playing video game. It was developed by Beijing-based studio O.T.K Games and published by SakuraGame and Rainy Frog LLC. The game was released on June 9, 2017, for Windows, and was later released on Nintendo Switch, PlayStation 4, Xbox One, and Xbox Series X/S on December 1, 2022. The game follows a female sellsword named Vivian who travels to the island of Mythrilla in search of her missing father. There, she is cursed and forced to serve an evil witch. The game is notable for its heavy graphical inspiration from Vanillaware titles such as Muramasa and Dragon's Crown. It received mixed reviews from critics, who praised its graphics, but called its gameplay simplistic, albeit worth the low price of the PC version.

== Reception ==
Reception

Review scores
Publication	Score
IGN	8.8/10
Nintendo Life	6/10

The most positive review of the game was given by Hiroaki Mabuchi of IGN Japan for its PC version. He called its low price impressive for such a polished game, and said that it was a respectful homage to Vanillaware, calling the artwork worthy of praise and "flawless". He praised the work put into the game's Japanese localization, although he criticized the use of too many lines at once as making it difficult to read characters' emotions. He also called aspects of the gameplay monotonous, saying that the overall game lacked uniqueness.

Gameplay magazine called some bosses frustratingly hard, and said the game needed to be better balanced, but still recommended it given its extremely low price.

Scott McCrae of Nintendo Life described the Switch version of Sword of the Vagrant as "solid, but unremarkable". He called the hand-drawn art "wonderful", and also praised the story, although he criticized the relatively large amount of exposition. He also criticized the early parts of the game for being overly "barebones" until Vivian unlocked her full moveset. He noted the lack of autosave as an annoying aspect of the game, albeit one that did not hinder him until the final boss, which had a "long, tedious structure".
