= When the Past Was Around =

2020 video game

- Developer: Mojiken Studio
- Publishers: Toge Productions; Chorus Worldwide
- Artist: Brigitta Rena
- Composer: Masadito "Ittou" Bachtiar
- Platforms: Windows; Nintendo Switch; PlayStation 4; Xbox One; Android; iOS
- Release: Windows; September 22, 2020; Nintendo Switch; December 16, 2020; PlayStation 4 December 17, 2020; Xbox One; December 18, 2020; Android, iOS; March 14, 2022
- Genre: Point-and-click adventure
- Mode: Single-player

When the Past Was Around is a 2020 point-and-click adventure video game developed by Mojiken Studio and published by Toge Productions. The game was released on September 22, 2020, for Windows. It was released on Nintendo Switch, PlayStation 4, and Xbox One in December 2020, then on Android and iOS in March 2022.

The game explores the relationship between a woman Eda and her lover, an anthropomorphic owl. The game consists of a series of escape room puzzles the player must solve to progress through the game. It does not use any dialogue or text to allow open interpretations and incorporates music to its narrative and puzzles. The game received positive critical reception for its hand-drawn art style, emotional story, and its openness to interpretation. When the Past Was Around won the Best Visual Art award at the 2019 SEA Game Awards.

== Gameplay ==
When the Past Was Around is an adventure point-and-click game and puzzle game. The player progresses in the game through solving escape-room-style puzzles, which take place in rooms and other locations shown from the side in a two-dimensional perspective. The player has to solve a number of puzzles related to daily activities such as doing laundry or drinking tea to proceed to the next location. To explore the current location, the player can move a cursor to the left and right of the screen. The cursor changes depending on whether the player can interact with the object. There is also a basic inventory system; the player can drag an object from the inventory onto the screen to use it. A hint button also shows possible objects the player can interact with.

The game autosaves the player's progress at the end of every chapter; it is not possible to manually save progress in the middle of the chapters. The only text in the game are terms for objects. The game only uses pictures and symbols to assist the player in gameplay. In one puzzle, the player has to refer to clues of numbers and symbols to play a melody in a piano. It is also described as a music game since some puzzles are based around music and require the player to find notes and complete melodies.

== Plot ==
The game begins with Eda in front on a birdcage containing a human silhouette. The silhouette then leads Eda to a door as the cage disappears. As Eda interacts with various rooms with keepsakes and musical paraphernalia, the silhouette reveals itself as her lover, an anthropomorphic owl who is also a violinist. Afterward, Eda finds herself in a cemetery and finds the owl playing the violin behind a mausoleum door. The game then presents various scenes of Eda's memories with the owl. The scenes reveal that the owl eventually dies during their relationship due to an unknown illness. Moreover, Eda played the violin since childhood but gradually loses her interest due to various factors, including the owl's death. Through experiencing flashbacks, Eda learns to move forward from grieving the owl's death.

== Development and release ==
When the Past Was Around was developed by Mojiken Studio and published by Toge Productions, which are both based in Indonesia. The game was created and illustrated by Indonesian illustrator and developer Brigitta Rena, who created the game as a love story that was relatable yet mysterious. It was made without any dialogue for players to loosely interpret her life experiences, which the game was based on. The development team had the challenge of having a unified view of the story from the game's absence of dialogue, as each member had a different interpretation of Eda and the owl's story. The team eventually agreed to the game's story details through "some trial and error", Rena said. Rena's hand-drawn scenes in the game were inspired from several manga and video games such as The Ancient Magus' Bride and Florence.

The game was released for Windows on September 22, 2020. Release of the game in consoles within the year was first announced in May 2020. In November, video game publisher Chorus Worldwide announced a release for PlayStation 4, Xbox One, and Nintendo Switch in December 2020 by publisher Chorus Worldwide was announced in November 2020. The game was published on the Nintendo Switch on December 16, on the PlayStation 4 the following day, and the Xbox One on December 18. A mobile version of the game was announced in September 2021. It was released on iOS and Android on March 14, 2022.

== Reception ==
Reception

Aggregate score
Aggregator	Score
Metacritic	(NS) 79/100 (PC) 77/100 (PS4) 78/100 (Xbox One) 73/100

Review scores
Publication	Score
Eurogamer	7/10
Nintendo Life	9/10
Push Square	7/10

When the Past Was Around received "generally positive" reviews according to review aggregate site Metacritic. The game won the Best Visual Art award in the 2019 SEA Game Awards.

Some reviewers gave positive reception on the game's hand-drawn visuals and sound. Nintendo Life's Stuart Gipp compared the art style to a children's book, and noted that the game's use of autumnal colors prevented it from being excessively cute "or esoteric for the sake of it" Critics also praised the sound effects and the piano and string-heavy soundtrack, which emulated "authentic, intimate spaces" and a "comfortable, inquisitive tone that immediately puts you at ease" for Rock Paper Shotgun's Katherine Castle. The lack of dialogue allowed the player to immerse in the soundtrack's piano and violin for Famitsu's "Amemiya".

Several reviewers saw the point-and-click gameplay as "pretty standard" and consisting of "fairly rudimentary puzzles". Most of the game's puzzles, which eventually become sophisticated as the game progresses, remained straightforward. Nintendo Life's Stuart Gipp praised the gameplay's cohesion, which "removes the abstract, arbitrary feeling" that may be present in hidden object games. Some reviewers criticized the lack of an autosave feature between chapters. Several reviewers finished the game within one to three hours. The game was brief and thus had an unrealized potential for Push Square's Graham Banks. Melanie Blagg of Adventure Gamers informed experienced players that they may not find the puzzles challenging, but recommended the game for its visuals, music, and emotional story.

Gipp called the game a "pretty straightforward tale of grief and loss", although its "dreamy and [...] vague presentation" allowed any open interpretation. They also commended the game's possibility for open interpretation despite its rigid structure and linear narrative. Some reviewers saw the scenes of the game disjointed, but become clearer as the game progresses as a "touching, bittersweet experience". When The Past Was Around "hits your emotions with all the feels" despite its "bright and breezy art style", Castle wrote.
