= The Way (video game) =

2016 video game

- Developer: Puzzling Dream
- Publishers: PlayWay; Ultimate Games
- Programmer: Blaise Sanecki
- Artist: Pawel Matysik
- Writer: Blaise Sanecki
- Composer: Panu Talus
- Platforms: Windows, Switch
- Release: Windows: WW: May 20, 2016; Switch: WW: May 2, 2019
- Genre: Platform
- Mode: Single-player

The Way is a 2D cinematic platform game released for Microsoft Windows in 2016 and Nintendo Switch in 2019. It was developed by Puzzling Dream and published by PlayWay. It tells the story of a space explorer who is unable to accept the death of his wife. Finding ancient writings on eternal existence during one of his last expeditions, he returns to the site in search of a way to bring her back to life.

== Gameplay ==
Typical to the genre, the gameplay is divided between platforming, combat and puzzles. Environments are generally hazardous, and the player has no health, and as such they're instantly killed by any hazard, such as fall damage, enemies with weapons, stationary enemies like giant carnivorous plants, or environmental hazards. Early in the game, the player acquires a laser weapon, which he can use to kill or temporarily stun some of the hazards; the weapon has a limited number of charges, and slowly reloads over time. Later, the player acquires a sphere with four powers: interacting with switches, performing telekinesis on certain objects, deflecting laser beams and incoming projectiles, and placing a marker to which the player can teleport back.

== Plot ==
The protagonist, named "Major Tom", exhumes the body of his deceased wife and steals a spaceship from the laboratory they both used to work at to return to a planet they served as a research expedition on that supposedly contains eternal life, in hopes to resurrect her. On the planet, it encounters hostile flora and fauna, as well as several alien cultures; after a close encounter, he electrocutes a large predator creature, and adopts its cub, which he names Tincan after its dietary habits. With the help of a local tribe, after years of work, he decodes the alien artifacts, discovering that he needs to collect three artifacts to reveal a hidden city. After collecting them, he takes off with his spaceship to scan the source of a signal, but is shot down by a bounty hunter, who he dispatches of.

To find the hidden city, Major Tom shuts down three energy generators that power a cloaking device that hide the city; arriving to the city it encounters resistance by an unknown force, but also a force that seems to aid him in its quest. Reaching the final tower, Tincan is killed by an ambush, and the unknown force causes a cave-in to stop him from reaching his goal — Major Tom then spends years digging through the rubble. At this point an old man, he finally arrives to a mainframe computer taken over by a hostile security program, which he defeats — while also fighting the Purple Tentacle and LeChuck — letting the alien race who created it reveal themselves. They explain that they have sought eternal life, and established it via the means of cyberspace. They offer him two choices: he can live in cyberspace with his wife, or he can join the alien race rehabilitating the city. Choosing the former shows Major Tom and his wife happy together, but their smile slowly fades away; choosing the latter shows the elderly Major Tom looking over the no longer hidden city.

Over the course of the game, an alien occasionally appears and takes covert photographs of Major Tom, unbeknownst to him. In the post-credits scene, it reports its findings to an anthropomorphic dog in a suit with a cane, who is disappointed and dispatches it, before walking back into the shadows.

== Development ==
In May 2014, developers started a Kickstarter campaign to fund the game. The campaign reached its goal with 1,566 backers, pledging over CA$20,000. Versions were planned for iOS, Android, OUYA, PlayStation, and Xbox, but in 2016 it was only released for Windows. A Switch version followed three years later, in May 2019, for the Nintendo eShop.

== Reception ==
The Windows version has a 67 out of 100 score ("mixed or average") at Metacritic based on 14 critic reviews.
