= Soccer Slammers =

2018 video game

- Developer(s): Atooi
- Publisher(s): Atooi
- Director(s): Jools Watsham
- Platform(s): Nintendo Switch
- Release: WW: 14 June 2018
- Genre(s): Sports
- Mode(s): Single-player, multiplayer

Soccer Slammers is a soccer video game developed and published by Atooi. It was released in June 2018 for the Nintendo Switch before the 2018 FIFA World Cup.

== Gameplay ==
The game is an arcade-styled soccer video game; unlike the FIFA series of soccer video games, which focuses on realism in gameplay and presentation, Soccer Slam features exaggerated and simplified gameplay, similar to NBA Jam's take on basketball. The game features two versus two gameplay with short, pixelated fictional characters in the art style of Minecraft. The game features local multiplayer with up to four players.

== Development ==
The game was first announced in late January 2018. The game is being developed by Atooi, the company formed by Jools Watsham after the dissolution of his prior co-founded company, Renegade Kid. Watsham described the game as being heavily influenced by NBA Jam. The game made its first appearance at the Game Developers Conference in March 2018. The game was initially planned to have video capturing features at release, but the feature was delayed until plans for a future free downloadable content (DLC) pack after release, due to technical problems outside of the developer's control. The game is scheduled for release before the July 2018 FIFA World Cup. The game was submitted to Nintendo for approval for release on the Nintendo Switch eShop in May 2018.

== Reception ==
Pocket Gamer criticized the game's simplicity, randomness, and lack of things to do, comparing it unfavorably to the type of soccer games made for the Game Gear.
