= Rage in Peace =

Indonesian action game

- Developer: Rolling Glory Jam
- Publisher: Toge Productions
- Engine: Unity
- Platforms: Windows, OS X, Switch
- Release: WW: 8 November 2018
- Genre: Platform
- Mode: Single-player

Rage in Peace is a side-scrolling platform game developed by Indonesian indie studio Rolling Glory Jam and published by Toge Productions. Released on 8 November 2018 on Steam and Nintendo Switch, the game centers around avoiding traps and obstacles in order to be able to die peacefully.

== Development ==
Rage in Peace started out as a prototype developed during the "Indies vs PewDiePie" Game Jam in 2014. Although the game did not make top 10 out of the 800 submissions to be played in PewDiePie's channel (it ranked 17th), it was played on his stream regardless, causing other YouTube channels to play the game as well and drawing interest into it.

The game is the first video game title released by Rolling Glory, which largely operates as a creative digital services firm and had only 2 employees working full-time on the game. Its developers remarked in an interview that the game was intended to remind the players "of their own mortality in a non-scary way", with them also stating that the game was loosely inspired by Brazilian novelist Paulo Coelho's stories. The game's soundtrack was done through collaboration with an Indonesian indie label.

At the end of July, it was announced that Rage in Peace would also see a Nintendo Switch release. The game was released on both Steam and the Nintendo eShop on 8 November 2018. Prior to the full release, the game's demo was made available on platforms such as itch.io, indieDB and Game Jolt.

== Gameplay ==
The player controls Timmy Malinu, an actuary, who comes into work to be informed by the grim reaper that he was meant to die that day. The player's objective is to avoid various hidden traps and obstacles (often requiring previous knowledge or trial and error) from killing Timmy, so that he may die peacefully "in his pyjamas". Timmy's movements are limited to running, jumping, and double jumping.

The game is described as a "rage game", with the player's death count being kept track on the top left corner of the screen.
