= Serial Cleaners =

- Developer: Draw Distance
- Publisher: 505 Games
- Platforms: Nintendo Switch; PlayStation 4; PlayStation 5; Windows; Xbox One; Xbox Series X/S
- Release: September 22, 2022
- Genre: Stealth
- Mode: Single-player

Serial Cleaners is a stealth game developed by Draw Distance and published by 505 Games. It is the sequel to Serial Cleaner and continues the theme of removing evidence from crime scenes.

== Gameplay ==
Serial Cleaners is a stealth game played in real-time from an isometric perspective. Players control contractors working for organized crime and are tasked with removing evidence from crime scenes. Each playable character has a special ability: Bob, the protagonist from the first game, can bag bodies so dragging them does not leave blood trails; Psycho can dismember corpses and use the limbs as weapons; Lati uses parkour to escape from the police; and Vip3r is a hacker who can control electronic surveillance devices. The levels include references to 1990s pop culture and have police patrolling the scene. Players must guide their character to the evidence, clean or remove it, and escape detection by the police. There are places where their character can hide, but if players are caught, they must replay the level. Between missions, the cleaners relate stories to each other as they reminisce about their jobs on New Year's Eve in 1999.

== Development ==
505 Games released Serial Cleaners on Nintendo Switch, PlayStation 4 and 5, Windows, and Xbox One and Series X/S on September 22, 2022.

== Reception ==
On Metacritic, the Windows and Xbox Series X/S versions of Serial Cleaners received mixed reviews, and the PlayStation 5 version received positive reviews. Although they said the missions can become a bit repetitive, Rock Paper Shotgun said it "makes murder-cleaning a fun task that rewards patience or chaos". GamesRadar disliked how little skill was required to win on each level and said all that was needed was to patiently exploit the limited intelligence of the police as they obliviously made their rounds. However, they praised the stylish graphics and said stealth game fans may still enjoy the late game, which is more challenging. NME called it "a game full of fascinating ideas" but criticized the lack of tension and the bugs.
