= Tesla vs Lovecraft =

2018 video game

- Developer: 10tons
- Publisher: 10tons
- Platforms: Windows; macOS; Linux; PlayStation 4; PlayStation 5; Xbox One; iOS; Nintendo Switch
- Release: NA: January 26, 2018
- Genre: Twin-stick shooter
- Modes: Single-player, multiplayer

Tesla vs Lovecraft is a 2018 twin-stick shooter video game developed and published by Finnish studio 10tons. Players control Nikola Tesla as he attempts to stop H. P. Lovecraft and his army of monsters.

== Gameplay ==
Horror author H. P. Lovecraft interrupts a demonstration of Nikola Tesla's newest invention. Tesla ignores Lovecraft's warnings, only to find that Lovecraft has become possessed by Cthulhu. Lovecraft steals all of Tesla's inventions and uses them to open a dimensional gateway for the monsters described in his fiction. Players take the role of Tesla as he fights the monsters, initially armed with conventional arms and a teleporter. Players can upgrade Tesla's weaponry as they find items, up to a mecha, and power-ups grant him brief advantages. Killing large numbers of monsters allows players to select perks, which grant special abilities during all fights on that level. Dying allows players to choose different perks, and they are reset when moving on to a new level.

== Release ==
Tesla vs Lovecraft was released for Microsoft Windows, macOS, and Linux on January 26, 2018. The PlayStation 4 version was released on March 13, 2018; the Xbox One and Nintendo Switch versions were released three days later. The iOS version launched on October 25, 2018. The Android version launched on May 2, 2019.

== Reception ==
Reception

Aggregate score
Aggregator	Score				
Aggregator	iOS	NS	PC	PS4	Xbox One
Metacritic	N/A	74/100	73/100	71/100	75/100

Review scores
Publication	Score				
Publication	iOS	NS	PC	PS4	Xbox One
Nintendo World Report	N/A	8.5/10	N/A	N/A	N/A
Pocket Gamer	4.5/5	N/A	N/A	N/A	N/A
Push Square	N/A	N/A	N/A	8/10	N/A
TouchArcade	4.5/5	N/A	N/A	N/A	N/A

Harry Slater of Pocket Gamer called the iOS version a "wonderfully violent and perfectly challenging shooter". Writing for TouchArcade, Jared Nelson called it "an absolutely fantastic top-down shooter" and 10tons's best game, despite some issues with the iOS controls. Reviewing the PlayStation 4 version for Push Square, Ken Talbot wrote, "The PS4 isn't exactly wanting for top down shooters, yet despite the familiarity of its execution, there's just so much to enjoy here." Andrew Reiner of Game Informer wrote, "Tesla vs. Lovecraft seems simple at first, but the way the environments are used is quite clever." The Nintendo Switch version, reviewed in Nintendo World Report by David Keremes, was criticized for lack of online co-op gameplay and the sameness of the levels. Kermes, however, said that it "looks and feels great", concluding that it is "a solid and fun twin-stick shooter".

Tesla vs Lovecraft won the 'Big Screen Game of the Year 2018' award at Finnish Game Awards 2019, while also gaining a nomination for the 'Finnish Game of the Year 2018' award.
