= The Uncertain: Last Quiet Day =

2016 video game

- Developer: ComonGames
- Publisher: ComonGames
- Engine: Unity
- Platforms: Windows; Android; iOS; Nintendo Switch; PlayStation 4
- Release: Windows; WW: September 22, 2016; Android; WW: September 23, 2016; iOS; WW: December 7, 2017; Switch, PS4; WW: March 3, 2022
- Genre: Adventure
- Mode: Single-player

The Uncertain: Last Quiet Day is an adventure video game developed by New Game Order. Players explore a post-apocalyptic future ruled by sentient robots.

== Gameplay ==
In a post-apocalyptic future, sentient robots take over the world. Players control RT-217NP, a robot who scavenges the remnants of human technology. The game is played from a third-person perspective, and players hear RT-217NP's thoughts on human society as they interact with the world. After completing various puzzles involving gathering parts to repair technology, players discover that humans are not extinct, as thought. RT-217NP joins a group of rebels who seek to rescue the humans. After this point, players are given more freedom to explore, and they can speak to various characters, choosing dialogue options.

== Development ==
ComonGames, a Russian game studio. The Uncertain: Last Quiet Day was released for Windows on September 22, 2016; Android on September 23, 2016; iOS on December 7, 2017; and Switch and PlayStation 4 on March 3, 2022.

== Reception ==
Although initially impressed by its graphics and production values, Rock Paper Shotgun said that The Uncertain: Last Quiet Day is "disastrous" and not worth playing because of what they felt were "ghastly sluggish controls" and "barely comprehensible writing/translation". Adventure Gamers praised the graphics and story, but they disliked the controls and thought some of the puzzles were frustrating. They concluded that it should hold the interest of adventure gamers. Pocket Gamer criticized it for having "poor writing, uninspired puzzles, and a wonky camera".

== Sequel ==
ComonGames [a.k.a. New Game Order] released another adventure game set in the same world, The Uncertain: Light at the End, in October 2020 for Windows, Mac, PlayStation, and Xbox One. The Nintendo Switch version is still in development as of 2026. Players control a human protagonist, and it does not continue RT-217NP's story. It received negative reviews on Metacritic.
