= WitchSpring3 Re:Fine – The Story of Eirudy =

2021 video game

- Developer: G Choice
- Publishers: G Choice; ININ Games
- Series: WitchSpring
- Platforms: iOS, Nintendo Switch, Windows
- Release: October 27, 2017 (iOS); August 13, 2021 (Switch); November 1, 2021 (Windows)
- Genre: Role-playing video game
- Mode: Single-player

WitchSpring3 Re:Fine – The Story of Eirudy is a role-playing video game developed and published by G Choice. It is an enhanced version of WitchSpring3, which was released for iOS on October 27, 2017, with upgraded graphics and voice acting. WitchSpring3 Re:Fine was released for Nintendo Switch on August 13, 2021, where it was published by ININ Games, and for Windows on November 1. The player controls Eirudy, a "Marionette Witch" living in Misty Forest who has the special power to bring puppets to life, albeit at the cost of stealing the life-force of living creatures. When she meets Adrian, a young nobleman whose mother is in a coma, they team up to search for a way to wake her up.

== Development and release ==
WitchSpring3 Re:Fine was developed by ININ Games and Studio Artdinks. It was released for the Nintendo Switch on 17 December 2020 in South Korea and 13 August 2021 in North America.

== Reception ==
Reception

Aggregate score
Aggregator	Score
Metacritic	58/100

Review scores
Publication	Score
RPGamer	2/5
TouchArcade	3/5

The game received an aggregate score of 58/100 on Metacritic for its Switch version, indicating "mixed or average reviews".

Jenni Lada of Siliconera rated the Switch version 6/10 points. While praising the story as interesting and noting the high quality of the game's artwork, she faulted the game's localization for being awkward and having errors. She also called the difficulty too tedious and easy if the player grinded. Stating that it felt too much like a mobile game, she said that, despite the addition of voice acting and new events, people would be better off getting the iOS version due to its far lower price.

Shaun Musgrave of TouchArcade rated the game 3/5 points, calling the price "ridiculous" and saying that it did not compare favorably to the Atelier series for the same price. While stating that the game was "charming enough", he also described it as "completely average".

Sam Wachter of RPGamer rated the Switch version 2/5 points, praising the game's music and "lovely" artwork, but also calling the game itself "boring" and "hollow". He criticized the combat as "clunky" and not optimized for the Switch, saying that large enemies created "massive lag". He also criticized the story as overly rushed, and the localization as poorly done, saying that in the hands of a talented localizer, the story would have more personality.
