= Valthirian Arc: Hero School Story =

2018 video game

- Developer: Agate
- Publisher: pQube
- Engine: Unity
- Platforms: Nintendo Switch; PlayStation 4; Windows
- Release: WW: October 2, 2018
- Genres: Management sim, role-playing
- Mode: Single-player

Valthirian Arc: Hero School Story is a video game developed by Agate and published by pQube. It combines gameplay from management sims and role-playing video games. Players run a school that teaches adventurers, who eventually go on quests.

== Gameplay ==
Players control the principal of a school for heroes. Players must train various aspiring adventurers in typical role-playing classes in a management sim-like mode. They occasionally get requests for specific classes, and they get bonus rewards if they fulfill the requests. Players can also support various factions in the kingdom after its ruler dies. Once the adventurers are ready, players are responsible for putting together teams of adventurers and equipping them. There are two kinds of quest that adventurers can go on: missions that play out without player interaction, and those where players control one of the adventurers alongside three computer-controlled non-player characters. The non-interactive quests work on a timer. Over time, players can unlock new classes, and the students graduate as they become more experienced.

== Development ==
The Valthirian Arc series began as flash games. pQube released Valthirian Arc: Hero School Story for Windows, PlayStation 4, and Switch on October 2, 2018. Agate, an Indonesian video game studio, made a sequel that was released in June 2023.

== Reception ==
Valthirian Arc: Hero School Story received mixed reviews on Metacritic. Though they found some of the gameplay to be simplistic, Digitally Downloaded said it is a charming game that is fun to play in short bursts. They felt it was difficult to become attached to the characters given the ephemeral nature of the parties. However, they enjoyed the dungeon crawls and the world itself. Nintendo World Report said it is enjoyable but suffers somewhat from having too many unpolished, disparate gameplay elements. Both Digitally Downloaded and Nintendo World Report complained of difficulty spikes. TouchArcade only played the early game. They sent all their students out on non-interactive adventures, which caused the game to disallow them from playing until 15 minutes had passed. They said the early game could be "slow and plodding", but they enjoyed leveling up their students.

== Agate ==
Agate
- Agate's logo after rebranding
- Founded: 2009
- Headquarters: Bandung, Indonesia
- Products: Valthirian Arc; Code Atma; Memories
- Number of employees: ± 300
- Website: agate.id

Agate is an Indonesian video game development company based in Bandung, West Java, Indonesia, best known for developing Valthirian Arc. It was founded on April 1, 2009. It has worked with publishers such as Square Enix and Electronic Arts. The company produces serious games, providing gamified applications to companies either via gamification of systems, advertisement games or training games meant to simulate the work environment. Agate had worked for Microsoft, Samsung and Coca-Cola. In October 2011, Agate together with Kummara and AnimartDigi held Indonesia Bermain in Bandung. 7000 people attended.

The founders of Agate met in October 2007 as college students when they decided to make a game with no budget. With no experience on making games beforehand, the game only made it to a playable state before being scrapped. Learning from this experience, the team moved on to make a game for Microsoft's Dream Build Play competition, titled Ponporon!. The title was showcased on Indonesia Game Show in 2008 and gave new hope to the team which drove them to start a video game company, which was founded on April 1, 2009. Seeing market condition at the time, Agate focused in flash games for a while before venturing to make advergames and service games in 2010. In addition, within that year, the company merged with another game studio named Lucidrine a fellow game studio that had previously worked at several popular flash games such as Valthirian Arc which continues to be an ongoing serial project, now worked on by Agate. The company expanded once more in 2011 with the establishment of Agate Jogja in Yogyakarta, Indonesia, along with the addition of a publishing division and attaining partnership with Chillingo. Within the same year, Agate had begun developing console games for the first time in its history, along with venturing into the creation of browser-based social games.

In 2012, Agate started a third-party publishing business while their game Football Saga reached its peak of 58.000 monthly users and 10.000 active daily users. Within the year, was also the first ever representative of Indonesia in the annual Tokyo Game Show to appear in its Asia New Stars, an exhibition geared towards introducing emerging game developers from Asia. In 2013, the company helped co-found AGI (Indonesia Gaming Association) while, in the same year, establishing a partnership with Square Enix to publish and localize Sengoku IXA in Indonesia. In 2014, formed a partnership with Les' Copaque Production to develop a game for Upin & Ipin.

By 2015, Agate's serious game business expanded outside of Indonesia and South East Asia. In 2016, scored a US$1,000,000 pre-series A round led by a local venture firm known as Maloekoe Ventures. The company also expanded their serious game business further to the company training games business. In 2017, Agate secured another partnership, this time with the biggest telecommunications company in Indonesia, Telkom Indonesia. They saw a growth of over 45% in the number of employees compared to 2016. In 2018, Agate released the third installment to their signature franchise, Valthirian Arc, Valthirian Arc: Hero School Story. Working together with the UK based publisher, PQube, the game was released for the PS4, Nintendo Switch and PC. In 2019, Agate worked together yet again with Telkom Indonesia to create Oolean. A partnership that was announced at Telkom Digisummit of 2019 with the goal of nurturing and sharpening the Indonesian game industry to be more competitive. To date, Agate had created over 250 games and gamification projects. In the same year, Agate also collaborated with CIAYO Stories to present the visual novel game titled Memories.

In 2021, Agate acquired Freemergency, the studio behind Retrograde Arena. In 2022, Agate launched a revamped version of their website, which positions themselves as 'Metaverse designers, developers, creators'.

=== Developed games ===
Title	Platform(s)	Year
Code Atma	Android	2020
Memories (previously Ciayo Stories)	Android	2019
Valthirian Arc: Hero School Story	Windows, PS4, Nintendo Switch	2018
Onet Asli	Android	2018
Teka Teki Santai	Android	2018
Bumbu Cinta: Love Spice	iOS, Android	2017
Dungeon Chef	iOS, Android	2017
Game Anak Sholeh	iOS, Android	2017
Fantasista	iOS, Android	2016
Upin & Ipin: Demi Metromillenium	iOS, Android	2016
Sengoku Ixa	Browser-based Game	2013
Football Saga 2	Browser-based Game	2012
Earl Grey and this Rupert Guy	Flash	2010
