= Super Hydorah =

2017 video game

- Artwork
- Developer: Locomalito
- Publisher: Abylight Studios
- Composer: Gryzor87
- Platforms: Microsoft Windows, Xbox One, PlayStation 4, PlayStation Vita, iOS, Nintendo Switch
- Release: Microsoft Windows, Xbox One, PlayStation 4, PlayStation Vita; September 20, 2017 iOS; May 17, 2018; Nintendo Switch; November 15, 2018
- Genre: Side-scrolling shoot 'em up
- Modes: Single-player, multiplayer

Super Hydorah is a 2017 independent side-scrolling shoot 'em up video game developed by Locomalito and published by Abylight Studios. It features a 16-32 bit era look and feel as well as a CRT Monitor effect. The game was released for Microsoft Windows, Xbox One, PlayStation 4, and PlayStation Vita on September 20, 2017, and later, in 2018, ported to iOS on May 17 and Nintendo Switch on November 15, respectively. The game is an expanded and enhanced version of the developer's previous freeware game Hydorah.

The game follows the Delta Lance, a lone space fighter, as its pilot fights to defeat the evil Meroptian alien race and save humanity. Super Hydorah received positive reviews, praising its graphics, design and music, while criticizing its game balance and unforgiving difficulty.

== Gameplay and synopsis ==
The old-school gameplay has been compared to Gradius and other classic side-scrolling shooters. The player controls the ship on a side-scrolling plane and can choose between several weapon classes that are divided into main, secondary and special weapon. Each level has a mid-boss and final boss. The game also has 3 game modes, including single-player, co-op multiplayer, and a robot control spin-off.

In Super Hydorah, the player will face hordes of Meroptians, the bio-mechanical creatures set in a ruthless war of conquest over the Omnios star. As the lone space pilot Delta Lance, the player will fight to defeat the evil of Hydorah that threatens the universe.

Super Hydorah features a non-linear level layout and requires the player to master the game to progress and choose their own path through the planets, hence offering alternative routes and multiple endings for better replayability.

There are 21 stages in Super Hydorah (up from 16 in Hydorah), divided into 35 sublevels and with 35 bosses and more than 100 enemies. The stages are connected with a map and can diverge at points with a second "true" ending available if the player completes all levels. While the original game limited the number of saves per playthrough to 5, the remaster allows infinite saves and continues.

== Development and release ==
Both the developer and composer of the game reside in Andalusia, Spain. The development of the original game Hydorah took two and a half years, and was released for Microsoft Windows on June 3, 2010. The game's original soundtrack was composed by Gryzor87 and resembles that of 16-bit titles, and influenced by Konami classic games, the TV series Ulysses 31, and rock bands such as Camel, Judas Priest, and Symphony X.

Locomalito and Abylight Studios announced the development of Super Hydorah, a new edition of the original Hydorah game. This is part of the agreement between the said developer and publisher to bring gaming titles, including Hydorah, to consoles.

Super Hydorah was released on September 20, 2017, for Steam and Xbox One. A new update for the Steam version was released in November 2018, including support for 9 languages, a new skill mode for inexperienced pilots, aesthetic changes, a new boss life bar, and more refinements.

On December 13, 2017, Super Hydorah was released for PlayStation 4 (3 game modes) and PlayStation Vita (single-player mode only), which both include trophies and a cross-buy option.

Abylight Studios teamed up with Limited Run Games to release a physical Collector's Edition and Standard Edition of Super Hydorah for PlayStation 4 on March 9, 2018, and for PS Vita on June 8, 2018. A physical edition for PlayStation 4 in Spain was also released through the agreement between Abylight Studios and GAME Stores.

In February 2018, Abylight Studios announced a full version of Super Hydorah for the arcade platform exA-Arcadia and was officially showcased in JAEPO 2018. This arcade version features non-stop action, rebalancing of difficulty for experienced players, and instant 2-player mode.

Super Hydorah was ported to iOS and released on May 17, 2018. In order to achieve adequate levels of control, Abylight has developed a polished tactile system and tweaks such as adapting controls to touch screens and new difficulty levels to maintain the original essence of the game. This version also includes support for 9 languages, haptic vibration, MFI Joystick support, and Game Center integration.

Yoyo Games, the developers of GameMaker Studio used by video game creators such as Locomalito, announced the option to export directly to Nintendo Switch in the summer of 2018. Abylgiht Studios released Super Hydorah for the Nintendo Switch through the Nintendo eShop on November 15, 2018. The Nintendo Switch version includes new features such as running at 60fps, selection skill mode, new boss life bar, new aesthetic changes and more refinements, and support for 9 languages.

In January 2020, Super Hydorah became available on Apple TV with access for players who previously purchased the game on iOS. This version includes control compatibility with MFi, Xbox, and PS4 controllers and cloud support to save across Apple devices, among other features.

== Reception ==
Reception

Aggregate score
Aggregator	Score
Metacritic	PC: 82/100; XONE: 82/100 iOS: 82/100

Review score
Publication	Score
TouchArcade	iOS: 4/5

Super Hydorah received positive reviews, with an aggregate score of 82/100 on Metacritic.

Tim W. of Indiegames.com called the original Hydorah a "gem of a game" that would "more than delight" SHMUP fans, but criticized the lack of a difficulty setting.

Jose A. Rodriguez of IGN Spain rated Super Hydorah 7/10 and said that it was fun, addictive and intense, but called it too difficult and repetitive. IGN Italy gave it a score of 8.2 out of 10.

Hobby Consolas gave it an 85.

The Games Machine gave it a 9 out of 10.

Maniac Games gave it a score of 74.

Nintendo Life reviewed the Switch version of the game giving it a score of 8/10.

Eurogamer recommended the game.

== See also ==
- Maldita Castilla
