= Zengami =

- Industry: Video games
- Founded: May 16, 2013; 11 years ago in Singapore
- Founders: Andrew Carter; Holger Liebnitz; Graeme Scott
- Headquarters: Singapore
- Products: TurtlePop (2018)
- Website: zengami.com

Zengami is a video game development company based in Singapore. The company is known for making the game TurtlePop: Journey to Freedom on the Nintendo Switch.

== History ==
Zengami was founded by Andrew Carter, the former executive producer at Atari Melbourne with Holger Liebnitz and Graeme Scott, the Art and Technical Directors respectively.

== Music and Sound Effects ==
The original music soundtrack for Turtlepop: Journey to Freedom was composed by Simon Betts, who also sourced and created all of the sound effects.
