= Serial Cleaner =

2017 video game

- Developer: Draw Distance
- Publishers: Curve Digital; Plug In Digital
- Platforms: Linux; macOS; PlayStation 4; Windows; Xbox One; Nintendo Switch; iOS; Android
- Release: Windows, PS4, Xbox One; July 14, 2017; Nintendo Switch; November 30, 2017 iOS; June 20, 2019; Android; February 11, 2025
- Genre: Stealth game
- Mode: Single-player

Serial Cleaner is a stealth game developed by Draw Distance and published by Curve Digital/Plug In Digital. Players attempt to remove evidence from crime scenes without being caught. It was followed by Serial Cleaners.

== Gameplay ==
Players control a cleaner who is hired to remove evidence at crime scenes in the 1970s. Besides moving corpses, this takes a literal aspect as they vacuum up blood. Police are already at the scene, and if they see the cleaner, they chase. Player can hide in various spots on the map, which causes the police to lose interest in them. Being caught forces players to replay the level and randomizes the locations of the objects that need to be cleaned.

== Development ==
Serial Cleaner was initially released by Curve Digital for PCs, PlayStation 4, and Xbox One on July 14, 2017. The Nintendo Switch version followed on November 30, 2017, and it was released on iOS on June 20, 2019. On February 11th, 2025, the game was rereleased for iOS and Android by Plug In Digital.

== Reception ==
On Metacritic, Serial Cleaner received positive reviews on the Switch and mixed reviews elsewhere. Rock Paper Shotgun, NintendoLife, and Vice liked the game's concept but found the idea of restarting randomized levels infuriating. Conversely, GamesRadar's reviewer found the scenes where he was caught funny, and he enjoyed the level design. Push Square wrote, "Its difficulty and slight release content are offset by a number of options, a great premise, and some uniquely engaging gameplay." NintendoWorldReport praised the gameplay and retro charm but felt that the Switch controls were sometimes inconsistent.
