= Temirana: The Lucky Princess and the Tragic Knights =

2023 video game

- Developers: Idea Factory (Otomate), ichicolumn
- Publishers: JP: Idea Factory; NA/EU: Idea Factory International
- Platforms: Nintendo Switch, iOS, Android
- Release: Nintendo Switch: JP: April 27, 2023; NA/EU: January 13, 2026; iOS, Android: JP: October 2, 2025
- Genres: Visual novel, otome game
- Mode: Single-player

Temirana: The Lucky Princess and the Tragic Knights (Note: Known in Japan as テミラーナ国の強運姫と悲運騎士団 (Temirana Koku no Tsuiteru Hime to Tsuitenai Kishidan)) is a 2023 otome game and visual novel.

== Gameplay ==
As it is a visual novel, the gameplay of Temirana consists of reading its story and making choices at certain points that determine plot events and other characters' levels of affection toward the protagonist.

== Development and release ==
Temirana was released for the Nintendo Switch in Japan on April 27, 2023, and it was later released for mobile devices in Japan on October 2, 2025.

Idea Factory International announced at Anime Expo 2024 that they would release an English-language version of the game in 2025, but the game's release was delayed into 2026. They ultimately released the translated version on January 13, 2026.

== Reception ==
Reception

Aggregate score
Aggregator	Score
Metacritic	81/100

Review scores
Publication	Score
Hardcore Gamer	3.5/5
RPGFan	85/100
Digitally Downloaded	4/5
Siliconera	8/10
Anime News Network	B+

Temirana: The Lucky Princess and the Tragic Knights received "generally favorable" reviews, according to the review aggregator website Metacritic.
