= Streets of Rogue =

2019 video game

- Developer: Matt Dabrowski
- Publisher: tinyBuild
- Composer: Craig Barnes
- Engine: Unity
- Platforms: Linux macOS; Windows; Nintendo Switch; PlayStation 4 Xbox One
- Release: July 12, 2019
- Genre: Roguelike
- Modes: Single-player, multiplayer

Streets of Rogue is a roguelite video game developed by Matt Dabrowski and published by tinyBuild for Linux, macOS, Microsoft Windows, Nintendo Switch, PlayStation 4, and Xbox One. It was initially launched in early access in 2017, and was fully released on July 12, 2019.

== Gameplay ==
Streets of Rogue is set in a procedurally generated city consisting of several floors. In order to progress, the players will need to accomplish specific mission goals through the use of special character traits and items. After every death, new gadgets and abilities can be bought for the next session with chicken nuggets earned up to that point. The action is seen from a top-down view, and every level has a different visual theme.

The Home Base is the central base of operations of the Resistance, an organisation created to fight against the tyranny of the Mayor of the city. It is populated by Resistance Leaders and other playable characters. Certain characters will allow the players to trade in Chicken Nuggets earned or provide other services as well.

There are 6 main stages in Streets of Rogue, formed, with the exception of the last, by 3 levels each: Slums, Industrial, Park, Downtown, Uptown and Mayor Village.

== Development ==
Lead designer Matt Dabrowski credited the games Fallout, Grand Theft Auto 2, Deus Ex, Messiah, The Binding of Isaac, and Spelunky as being major inspirations for Streets of Rogue.

In late 2013, Dabrowski played an early alpha of Wasteland 2 and became disillusioned with the complexity of its RPG mechanics; the initial concept behind Streets of Rogue was to recreate the "city-based, mission-based, freeform, open-ended gameplay" seen in games like Grand Theft Auto 2 and Fallout, but without unneeded complexity.

Streets of Rogue began development in early 2014 as an early prototype created in Construct 2. Due to poor performance that couldn't be resolved through optimizations, Dabrowski migrated the game to the Unity engine in August 2014.

== Reception ==
Reception

Aggregate score
Aggregator	Score
Metacritic	(NS) 75/100 (XONE) 82/100

Review scores
Publication	Score
Jeuxvideo.com	17.5/20
Nintendo Life	8/10
PC Gamer (US)	84/100

On its release, Streets of Rogue was met with generally favorable reviews from critics, with an aggregate score of 75/100 for Nintendo Switch, and 82/100 for Xbox One on Metacritic.

Polygon praised the game for its comedic elements, explaining that "comedy in game design is difficult [and[ [i]t’s something of an achievement that developer Matt Dabrowski pulls it off by piling cheap gags so high, so often." Rock Paper Shotgun compared it to "relatively plain-faced immersive sims of the blockbuster sort", praising the "sheer variety of this city’s pandemonium". PC Gamer compared it to other roguelikes, celebrating that Streets of Rogue "gives you more freedom than almost any roguelike, and its varied cast of characters, combined with the randomness of traits and mutators, mean no two runs play out the same way." Nintendo Life also compared it to related game genres, explaining that "RPGs are at their best when they give you a world where you can be anyone and do anything [...] so if you want to be a werewolf, or a scientist, or a bartender, then this is the game for you."

== Sequel ==
In 2020, a sequel was announced by Matt Dabrowski. He added that he did not have any established development schedule at the time. The plan is to build it on the existing code of the original game, and make something that is more open-ended. Streets of Rogue 2 is scheduled to be released in early access when it is ready.
