= Treadnauts =

2018 video game

- Developer(s): Topstitch Games
- Publisher(s): Topstitch Games
- Platform(s): macOS; Microsoft Windows; Nintendo Switch; PlayStation 4 Xbox One
- Release: August 17, 2018
- Genre(s): Action
- Mode(s): Single-player, multiplayer

Treadnauts is a 2D multiplayer action video game developed by Topstitch Games. Treadnauts was released on August 17, 2018 for macOS, Microsoft Windows, Nintendo Switch, PlayStation 4, and Xbox One.

== Gameplay ==
The players take control of a tank on the field with different maps while shooting another tank in a competitive playground and it contains 2-4 players. Various power-ups can be picked on the crate like laser guns, camouflage, jetpack, and others. players can fire boosters while hopping into mid-air. the game also has a singleplayer mode for a player to practice their shooting range.

== Reception ==
Treadnauts received a 7.5/10 rating on NintendoWorldReport with praise going to the game's local multiplayer, controls and physics while also criticizing its lack of single-player content. Treadnauts has won Casual Connect Indie Prize: Best Multiplayer Game, Seattle Indie Game Competition Finalist., iFest People's Choice Award 2017 and also PAX West 2018.
