= Sparklite =

2019 video game

- Developer: Red Blue Games
- Publishers: Merge Games; Playdigious (mobile)
- Composer: Dale North
- Platforms: Windows; PlayStation 4; Nintendo Switch; Xbox One; iOS; Android
- Release: Windows, PS4, Switch, Xbox One; 14 November 2019; iOS, Android; 9 November 2021
- Genres: Action-adventure, roguelite
- Modes: Single-player, multiplayer

Sparklite is a 2019 action-adventure roguelite video game developed by Red Blue Games and published by Merge Games. The player controls Ada, an engineer stranded in the land of Geodia, where she battles the forces of a mining magnate known as the Baron.

The game was released for Windows, PlayStation 4, Nintendo Switch and Xbox One on 14 November 2019. A mobile version for iOS and Android, handled by Playdigious, followed on 9 November 2021. Reviews were mixed to average, with critics comparing the game to 2D Legend of Zelda titles.

== Gameplay ==
Sparklite is a top-down action-adventure game with roguelite elements. The player controls Ada, who explores the land of Geodia across five themed regions. The layout of each region is procedurally generated and is reshuffled by earthquakes known as disruptions whenever Ada is defeated. When this happens, the player retains any collected sparklite, the ore that serves as the game's currency.

Between expeditions Ada returns to the Refuge, a floating settlement that acts as a hub. Sparklite can be spent there on upgrades that improve attributes such as health, armour and damage, which occupy space on a limited grid. Each region contains a shrine that grants a blueprint for a new gadget, such as a crossbow or floating bombs, alongside a mine filled with enemies and a dungeon housing one of the Baron's Titan bosses. Combat mixes melee attacks using Ada's wrench with ranged gadgets.

After defeating the first boss the game can be played in local co-op, with a second player controlling Ada's robot companion Wingnut, whose abilities are limited to support tasks such as digging up sparklite and lighting dark areas.

== Plot ==
Ada, a young engineer travelling with her robot assistant Wingnut, crash-lands in Geodia after creatures corrode the hull of her ship. She is rescued by the inhabitants of the Refuge, who are hiding from the Baron, an industrialist mining the planet's sparklite core to fuel his war machines.

The pollution from his operations is corrupting Geodia's wildlife and environment, while the core itself fights back by triggering disruptions that rearrange the land. Ada sets out to shut down the Baron's digsites and stop him before he can seize the core.

== Development and release ==
Sparklite was developed by Red Blue Games, a three-person studio based in Durham, North Carolina. The game was the studio's first major title and spent four years in development. The soundtrack was composed by Dale North. The developers described the game as an approachable roguelike, combining procedural generation in the style of Rogue Legacy with the structure of classic adventure games such as The Legend of Zelda: A Link to the Past.

Merge Games announced the game in August 2018 for Windows, PlayStation 4, Nintendo Switch and Xbox One, and it was released on 14 November 2019. A physical Signature Edition, bundling the game with its soundtrack, an art book and other extras, was announced in June 2019.

In August 2021 Playdigious announced it would bring the game to iOS and Android, and the mobile version launched on 9 November 2021. The iOS release was a premium purchase while the Android version was free to start, with a single purchase unlocking the full game after the first boss.

== Reception ==
Reception

Aggregate scores
Aggregator	Score
Metacritic	NS: 75/100; PS4: 72/100; PC: 70/100; XONE: 73/100
OpenCritic	72/100

Review scores
Publication	Score
Nintendo Life	8/10
Nintendo World Report	7.5/10
Shacknews	8/10
GameSpot	6/10
Push Square	8/10

Sparklite received mixed or average reviews according to review aggregator Metacritic, which recorded scores of 75/100 for the Nintendo Switch version, 72/100 for the PlayStation 4 version, 70/100 for the PC version and 73/100 for the Xbox One version. On OpenCritic the game holds an average score of 72/100 based on 54 reviews, with 59% of critics recommending it.

Critics frequently compared Sparklite to 2D Zelda games. Jamie Sharp of Nintendo Life called it a charming action-adventure that channels the series while establishing its own quirks, and wrote that the roguelite structure is woven into the story well enough to win over players wary of the sub-genre. Donovan Erskine of Shacknews considered it an impressive debut in the genre for a studio previously known for mobile games.

David Lloyd of Nintendo World Report felt the combat and visual design captured the appeal of 2D Zelda games but argued that procedural generation stripped the regions of character and made the Titan battles predictable. Hope Corrigan of GameSpot praised the game's early progression but criticised its technical problems, unfair deaths and repetitive later stages. Nat Eker of Push Square recommended playing alone, describing the co-op mode as mostly pointless because of Wingnut's limited abilities. Chris Carter of Destructoid suggested the Switch version was the best fit for short play sessions. He wrote that the minimal storytelling and safe design choices kept the game from matching recent roguelike classics.
