= Switch Player =

Nintendo Switch video gaming magazine

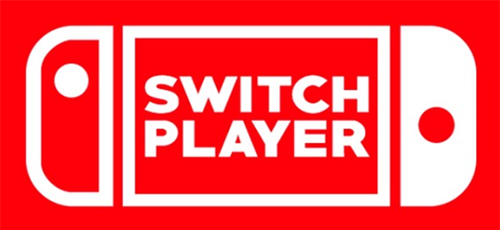
- Categories: Computer and video games
- Frequency: Monthly
- Format: Online distribution, print
- Founder: Paul Murphy
- Founded: 2016
- First issue: 31 January 2017; 9 years ago
- Final issue: 18 July 2023; 3 years ago
- Country: United Kingdom
- Language: English
- Website: switchplayer.net

Switch Player was a video gaming magazine that features news and columns regarding the Nintendo Switch, first released in January 2017. The monthly release of the magazine features a print run, as well as a free PDF release.

== History ==
Switch Player was founded in 2016, by Paul Murphy, creator and lead editor of PlayStation Vita website and blog The Vita Lounge. (Note: Murphy also ran a short lived "360 Lounge", based on the Xbox 360.) Murphy created Vita Lounge due to the "lack of coverage" for the console in 2013. Before the release of the magazine, a patreon was set up for the magazine, with backers receiving an A5 printed version of the magazine, with a run of 500 being created for each issue. The first issue of the magazine was released on 31 January 2017.

Shortly after, the magazine was represented on Metacritic, providing over 300 reviews in the first year of the magazines' run.

== Features ==
Switch Player magazine includes interviews, reviews and features for upcoming games on the Nintendo Switch.
