= Autosave =

Automatic saving function

Autosave is a saving function in many computer applications and video games which automatically saves the current changes or progress in the program or game, intending to prevent data loss should the user be otherwise prevented from doing so manually by a crash, freeze or user error. Autosaving is typically done either in predetermined intervals or before, during, and after a complex editing task is begun.

== Application software ==
It has traditionally been seen as a feature to protect documents in an application or system failure (crash), and autosave backups are often purged whenever the user finishes their work. An alternative paradigm is to have all changes saved continuously (as with pen and paper) and all versions of a document available for review. This would remove the need for saving documents entirely. There are challenges to implementation at the file, application and operating system levels.

For example, in Microsoft Office, this option is called AutoRecover and, by default, saves the document every ten minutes in the temporary file directory, and this feature was introduced in Microsoft Office 97. Restarting an Office program after crashing prompts the user to save the last recovered version. However, this does not protect users who mistakenly click "No" when asked to save their changes if Excel closes normally (except for Office 2013 and later). Autosave also syncs documents to OneDrive when editing normally.

Mac OS 10.7 Lion added an autosave feature that is available to some applications, and works in conjunction with Time Machine-like functionality to periodically save all versions of a document. This eliminates the need for any manual saving, as well as providing versioning support through the same system. A version is saved every five minutes, during any extended periods of idle time, or when the user uses "Save a version," which replaces the former "Save" menu item and takes its Command-S shortcut. Saves are made on snapshots of the document data and occur in a separate thread, so the user is never paused during this process. Applications need to be updated to take advantage of this functionality, and a number of Apple's built-in programs were updated with the release. Autosave cannot be disabled in Lion.

One of the first implementation of this feature appears in the text editor Elvis.

== Video games ==
Autosave is common in video games. Many video games have an autosave feature that saves progress during a session. For example, in an adventure game, it may autosave after completing a level or mission, or in fighting games, it might save after winning a match. Such points are called savepoints; sometimes the distinction from a checkpoint is blurred. Some games use autosave as the only method of saving data, and the player must complete a set amount of the game before saving takes place. Still another use of autosaving is as an anti-cheating device; for example, in every Mega Man Battle Network sequel, the chip trader machines autosave upon giving out a new battle chip so the player can't cheat by soft resetting after each try of the chip trader until the desired chip is received. A more serious downside of autosaving is that it can prevent the player from completing a game if a save operation fails due to a sudden cessation of game operation, whether by a crash, freeze, or power loss of the gaming system (resulting in the save file being corrupted), or if a successful autosave preserves the effects of a game-breaking bug or a player mistake (such as making a wrong decision in a game with multiple endings or losing a critical character permanently) that otherwise renders the game unwinnable.

== See also ==
- Persistent state
