= Indie Fund =

Organization funding independent game developers

The Indie Fund is an organization created by several independent game developers to help fund budding indie video game development. The Indie Fund was created in early 2010, its purpose aimed "to encourage the next generation of game developers" by providing them funding for development of these games without the terms that would normally be associated with publication agreements.

The founding and current members of the Indie Fund include Ron Carmel and Kyle Gabler of 2D Boy, Jonathan Blow, creator of Braid and The Witness, Kellee Santiago formerly of Thatgamecompany and currently at Niantic, Nathan Vella of Capybara Games, Matthew Wegner of Flashbang Studios, and Aaron Isaksen of AppAbove Games.

== History ==
Members of the Indie Game organization have identified difficulties for indie developers to be able to fund their projects. Ron Carmel noted that there are typically two ways that this funding can occur: either through the developers providing their own money to initiate the project, or by signing deals with publishers for funding in exchange for part of the game's revenues being given back to the publisher. Neither of these choices were considered optimal for an aspiring developer, according to Carmel.

In 2008, several self-published indie games, including Audiosurf, Braid, Castle Crashers, and World of Goo were released to both strong critical reception and large sales. All of these games were initially funded by their respective studios, and demonstrated that investment in independent games could be profitable. With the following years also providing more commercially successful games, the Indie Fund group decided to create the fund, using the profits from these games, as to aid the next iteration of indie games.

== Funding model ==
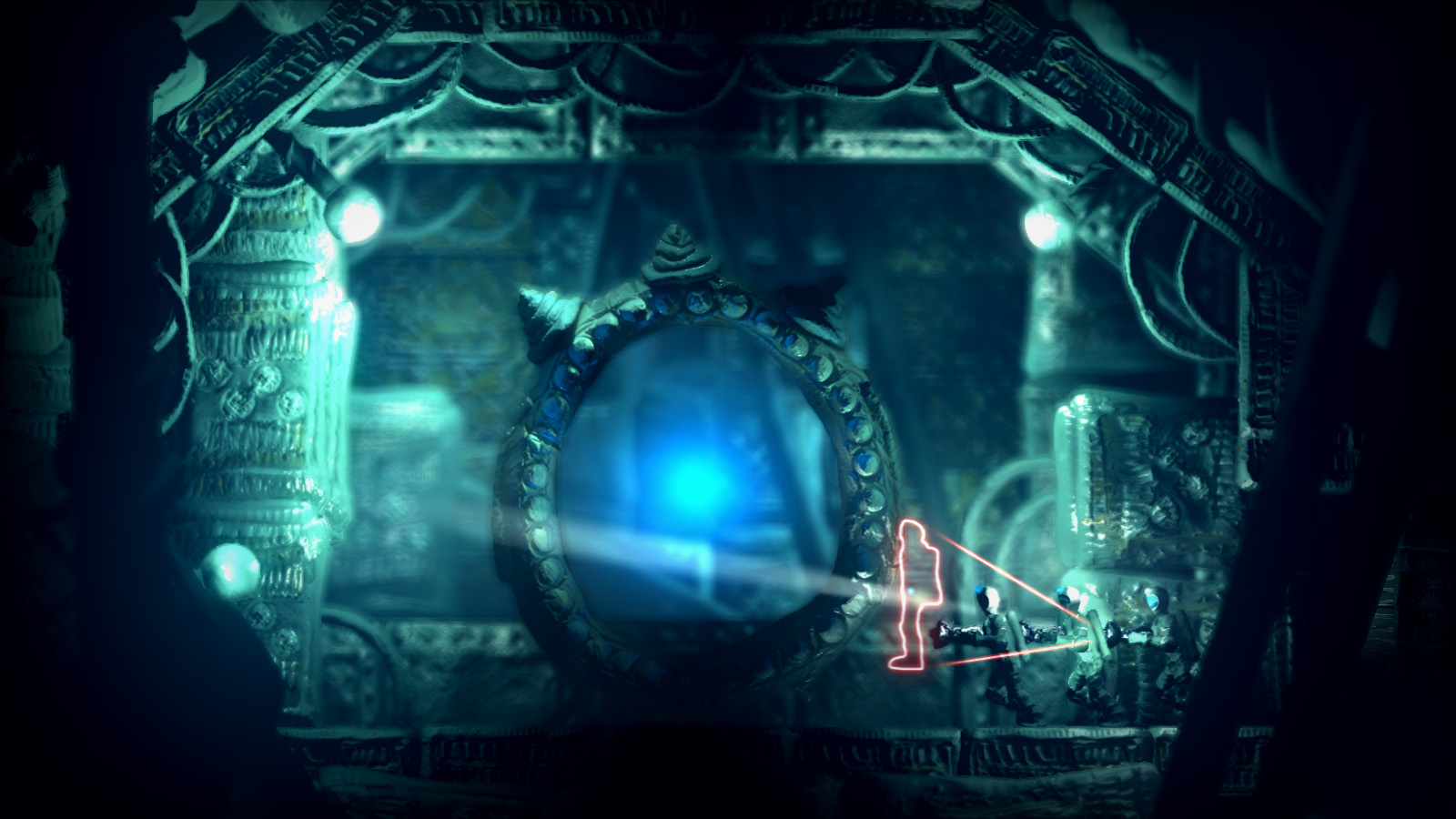
The Swapper was financed in part by the Indie Fund.

Investments in indie games are pulled from the Fund's reserves. Currently, the group states they can select two to three games that they can support per year, but they believe as the Fund expands, they can invest in more projects. Developers cannot directly apply for investment by the Fund; instead, the Fund watches the indie game market, observing games that get notice from the gaming press through both conferences and word-of-mouth, and selects candidate teams from these sources. The Fund provides monthly payments to the selected projects to cover development costs; upon release, the developers are expected to pay back the development funding and a small portion of the game's revenue over the next three years based on the level of funding required. There is no penalty for failing to be able to pay back the full funding and revenue; should this occur within three years of release, the Fund requires no further payment, and all further revenue can be kept by the developers. The Fund allows the developer to retain all IP rights, and does not set any timetable for the development, only requesting monthly progress updates.

As an example, Q.U.B.E., the first Indie Fund-backed game to be released, had an original budget request of about $42,000 in August 2010; aware that it was apparently going over-budget, the Fund approved additional funding to bring the total investment to $90,000. With four days of the title being released on the Steam software delivery platform, the title has sold 12,000 copies, sufficient to repay the investment. The second game, Dear Esther, cleared 16,000 units within 6 hours of being available on Steam, the revenue from that completely repaying the Indie Fund's contribution.

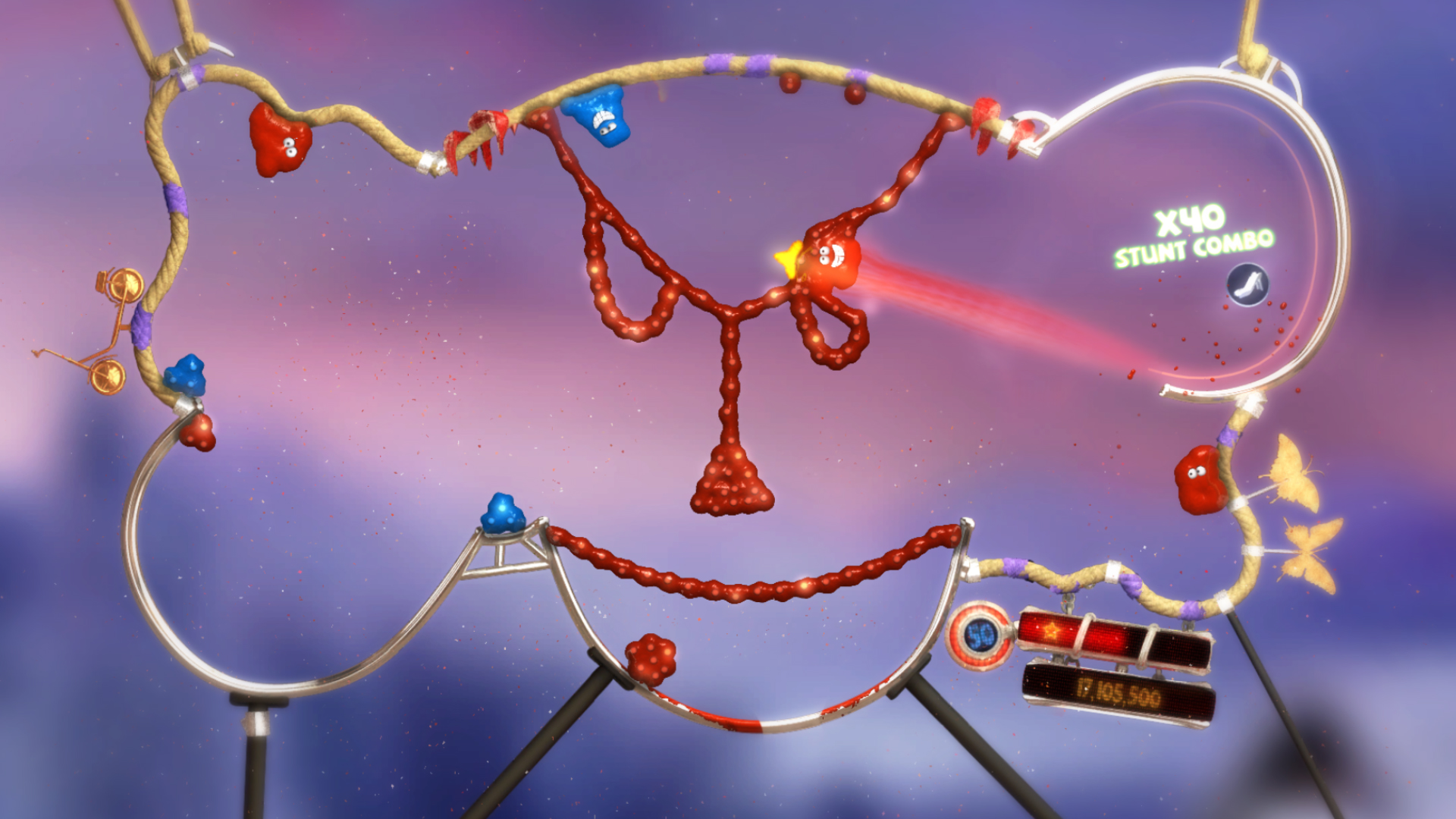
The PC port of The Splatters was financed in part by the Indie Fund.

In February 2012, the Indie Fund changed their repayment model, now only asking for the initial investment back plus 25% of the revenues from sales through the first two years or until they have doubled their investment, whichever comes first. This allows the Fund to allow for broader projects in size and scope, as well as take more risks on games that may not be as financially successful as others. One example is the decision to fund the game The Splatters in September 2012; though the game had previously been released to Xbox Live Arcade in April 2012, the game was considered unsuccessful but the developers, Spiky Snail, wanted to revise the title based on lessons learned and port it to more systems. The Indie Fund agreed to back the improvements, feeling that the developers had shown an understanding of the initial faults to assure a product that will overcome the risks of investment.

A further change was made in June 2015, allowing investors to decide how their funds can be distributed to the various games currently supported by the Indie Fund.

== Funded games ==
At the 2011 Game Developers Conference, the Indie Fund announced the first three games that it had already funded Q.U.B.E. by Toxic Games (which would later be the first Indie Fund game to be released in December 2011), Monaco by Pocketwatch Games, and Shadow Physics by Scott Anderson and Steve Swink. The Indie Fund has also announced funding for one other yet-to-be-named titles from Double Fine Productions. The Indie Fund also provided $50,000 in funding for the development of That Dragon, Cancer.

Year	Title	Developer	Status	Platform	Notes
2011	Q.U.B.E.	Toxic Games	Released	Windows, Wii U, PlayStation 3, Xbox 360	Q.U.B.E. was one of the twelve finalists, but did not win, for the 2011 Indie Game Challenge sponsored by the Academy of Interactive Arts & Sciences. Success on PC led to ports for consoles.
2011	Shadow Physics	Scott Anderson and Steve Swink	Cancelled	Xbox Live Arcade	At GDC 2012 Anderson revealed the game had its funding cut and had been cancelled.
2012	Dear Esther	thechineseroom and Robert Briscoe	Released	Windows	Originally a free game modification for Half-Life 2, the funding was used to expand the work to a stand-alone title.
2012	Mushroom 11	Untame	Released	Windows, Mac, Linux	
2013	Antichamber	Alexander Bruce	Released	Windows	
2013	Monaco: What's Yours is Mine	Pocketwatch Games	Released	Windows and Xbox Live Arcade	
2013	Faraway	little--eyes	Unreleased	iOS	
2013	The Swapper	Facepalm Games	Released	Windows	
2013	Panoramical	Fernando Ramallo and David Kanaga	Released	Interactive music exhibit	Currently touring various indie game shows
2013	Super Splatters	SpikySnail Games	Released	Windows, OS X, Linux	
2013	Donut County	Little Flag Software	Released	Windows, OS X, iOS	Formerly named Kachina.
2013	Fract OSC	Phosfiend Systems Inc.	Released	Windows, OS X	
2013	Spacebase DF-9	Double Fine Productions	Released	Windows, OS X, Linux	Spinout of game developed during Amnesia Fortnight 2012.
2014	Hack 'N' Slash	Double Fine Productions	Released	Windows, OS X, Linux	Spinout of game developed during Amnesia Fortnight 2012.
2014	FRAMED	Loveshack Entertainment	Released	iOS, Android, Windows, OS X, Linux	Also has received funding from Screen Australia.
2014	Nova-111	Funktronic Labs	Released	Windows, OS X, Linux	
2014	Due Process	Giant Enemy Crab	In Development	Windows	
2014	Ernesto RPG	Daniel Benmergui	In Development	Windows, OS X, Tablet	
2014	Future Unfolding	Spaces of Play	Released	PS4, Windows, OS X, Linux	
2014	Gorogoa	Jason Roberts	Released	Windows, OS X	
2014	SoundSelf	Robin Arnott	In Development	Windows, OS X, Linux	
2014	Soft Body	Zeke Virant	Released	Windows, PS4, PSVita	
2015	Her Story	Sam Barlow	Released	Windows, OS X	
2015	Manifold Garden	William Chyr Studio	Released	Windows, PS4, OS X, Linux	Formerly named Relativity
2015	Engare	Mahdi Bahrami	Released	Windows, OS X	
2015	Armello	League of Geeks	Released	Windows	Previously funded through Kickstarter.
2015	The Flock	Vogelsap	Released	Windows	
2015	Duskers	Misfits Attic	Released	Windows	
2016	That Dragon, Cancer	Numinous Games	Released	Windows, OS X, Ouya, iOS	
2016	Burly Men at Sea	Brain&Brain	Released	Windows, OS X, iOS, Android	
2016	Miegakure	Marc Ten Bosch	In Development	Windows, PS4, OS X, Linux	
2016	Event[0]	Ocelot Society	Released	Windows, OS X	
2016	Old Man's Journey	Broken Rules	Released	Android, iOS, Windows, OS X	
2017	Hollow Knight	Team Cherry	Released	Windows, OS X, Linux, Switch	
2017	Ape Out	Gabe Cuzzillo	Released	Windows	
2017	The Captain	Sysiac Games	In Development	Windows	
2017	Spartan Fist	Glass Bottom Games	Released	Windows	
2017	Night in the Woods	Infinite Fall	Released	Windows, OS X, Linux, PlayStation 4, Xbox One, Switch, iOS, Android	
2017	Eufloria RPG	Omni Systems	In Development		
2017	Planetoid Pioneers	Data Realms	Released	Windows	
2017	Runner3	Choice Provisions	Released	Windows, OS X, PlayStation 4, Switch	
2017	The Stillness of the Wind	Lambic Studios	Released	Windows, OS X, Switch, iOS	
2018	Tunic	Andrew Shouldice	Released	Windows, OS X, Xbox One	
2018	Quench	Axon Interactive	Released	Windows, Switch	
2018	Cheap Golf	Pixeljam	Released	Windows, OS X, Linux	
2018	Overloop	George Kobyakov	Released	Windows, OS X, Linux	
2018	Fabular	Spiritus Games	In Development	Windows	
2018	Taiji	Matthew VanDevander	Released	Windows	
2019	The Collage Atlas	John William Evelyn	Released		
2019	Guildlings	Sirvo Studios	Released	Apple Arcade	
2019	Losswords	Local No. 12	In Development		
2021	Slipways	Beetlewing	Released		
