= Mad Tracks =

- Xbox Live Arcade cover
- Developer: Load Inc.
- Publishers: Micro Application: Windows; FRA: Micro Application; GER: Frogster Interactive; RUS: Akella; POL: Nicolas Games Xbox 360; WW: D3 Publisher Wii; FRA: Neko Entertainment iOS; WW: Namco Bandai
- Directors: Bertrand Carré; Hervé Nedelec
- Programmer: Florian Pernot
- Composer: La Chimiz Prod
- Platforms: Windows, Xbox 360, Wii, iOS
- Release: February 17, 2006: Windows; FRA: February 17, 2006; GER: February 23, 2006; RUS: June 13, 2006; POL: October 20, 2006 Xbox 360; WW: May 30, 2007 Wii; FRA: December 4, 2009 iOS; WW: December 14, 2011
- Genre: Racing
- Modes: Single-player, multiplayer

Mad Tracks, (Note: Russian: Mad Tracks: Заводные Гонки Romanized: Mad Tracks: Zavodnyye Gonki (lit. Mad Tracks: Groovy Racing/Clockwork Races)) also known as Small Cars 3D (Note: French: Petites Voitures 3D) in France, is a 2006 racing video game developed by Load Inc. and published by various publishers for several platforms. Inspired by Darda toys, players control spring-powered model cars and compete in racing competitions and minigames through various everyday environments.

Mad Tracks is the debut title for the Paris-based studio Load Inc. It was originally a licensed game based on the Darda toy cars but was reworked and retitled after the studio failed to secure the brand's intellectual rights. It was originally released for Windows computers on February 17, 2006. It was later ported to the Xbox 360 via Xbox Live Arcade on May 30, 2007, and became backwards compatible with Xbox One in February 2017. It was also released on the Wii in France in 2009, followed by a mobile port on iOS in 2011 and Android a year later. In February 2019, it was announced that the game was delisted from Xbox Live Arcade because of a change in publishing rights from D3 Publisher to Plug In Digital. The latter released a reworked high-definition version of the game for Steam on March 10, 2020.

Mad Tracks was a commercial success, selling millions of units across multiple platforms despite a mixed critical reception.

== Gameplay ==
An example of the gameplay in Mad Tracks on PC. The top screenshot depicts a billiard minigame, while the bottom screenshot shows a race.

In Mad Tracks, the player controls a toy car, set in various everyday environments, such as a bistro, toy store, or mini golf course, each rendered and presented in 3D. There are 46 courses in total, each divided into races and minigames; the former features races based on laps, point A to point B, time attack, weakest link, or bobsleigh, whereas the latter features minigames such as mini golf, billiards, bowling, or table football.

Each toy car features spring-powered batteries. The longer the player accelerates, the weaker the spring becomes. The battery eventually runs out, after which the player can no longer accelerate. The player can regenerate power by letting go of the acceleration button; the spring immediately recharges. It will also recharge while the car is airborne or reversing. The amount of usage of a spring will also depend on which type of car used. Other methods of recharging the spring include finding and using one of the power-ups, one of which drains opponents' batteries. The player can switch between camera angles, including first-person, at any time. As well, they can teleport to the last-reached checkpoint, automatically or manually by pressing a button, for instance, when they fall off the track.

Mad Tracks features two game modes: the single-player "Adventure" mode and the multiplayer "Arcade" mode. In Adventure, the player's objective is to achieve gold trophies by completing objectives, such as driving around a track or landing cars on a dartboard. The Arcade mode is similar to the single-player mode and includes the same objectives. Up to four players can play together locally in split-screen, and up to eight players can play together online. The PC version supports LAN connection. While both Wii and mobile versions only support four-player multiplayer.

== Development ==
Mad Tracks was developed by Load Inc., a Paris-based studio founded in 2003. Formed by former employees of Ubisoft, primarily by Denis Bourdain and Thomas Leinekugel, to develop video games independently. Assembled a team of 10 people, experienced in developing racing games such as POD (1997) and the F-1 Grand Prix series. After seeing the potential for the "mid price car game" following the 2003 GDC and E3, the developers decided to make a licensed game based on the Darda toy cars. It was reworked and renamed Mad Tracks after the studio failed to secure the Darda brand's intellectual rights.

Two other racing games served as inspiration: Micro Machines (1991) inspired the visuals, split-screen and multiplayer, while TrackMania (2003) inspired the physics and the environment interactions. The studio used proprietary middleware to develop the car physics and racing-related aspects of the game. Thomas Leinekugel served as project manager; Hervé Nedelec was a creative director, and Florian Pernot was the lead programmer. Bertrand Carré served as technical director, Thibault Gicquel as level designer, and Nicolas Jeannot and Emmanuel Petit were the respective graphic designers. Music was provided by La Chimiz Prod, and Denis Bourdainin was a business developer.

=== Xbox Live Arcade ===
Mad Tracks was initially developed for Windows and PlayStation 2. At E3 2004, a PlayStation Portable version was announced to be developed, as the studio thought it would take better advantage of the texturing than the PlayStation 2, and as part of a planned cross-platform release with online support. An Xbox port was later announced in March 2005. Both Microsoft and Sony however, criticized and opposed the game's release on multiple platforms, as both companies wanted nothing to do with each other. This harmed the team's morale, making them think less like developers and more like "business people". In the struggle to choose either company's console for the intended platform for port, the Xbox 360 was chosen, when Denis traveled to Microsoft at Seattle. In there, the director of Xbox Live Arcade, Ross Erickson, found Mad Tracks to be suitable for Xbox Live, which had a shortage of racing games. In September, Load Inc. secured its first development kit for the console. While the reasons for the PlayStation Portable version's cancellation are unknown, the PlayStation 2 version's cancellation was due to the console becoming an increasingly less viable target platform with a more difficult development process than the Xbox 360.

Development of the Xbox 360 port took place over the course of a year, with seven employees being involved. It is one of the first games on the service to feature support for multiple languages. The port has also been updated to support the tenth version of DirectX, unlike the PC version which only supported its ninth version. However, one of the challenges when porting the game was limitations regarding storage made by Microsoft (being 50 MB); thus, the game had to be split into three parts.

== Release ==
Mad Tracks was first revealed to the public as a prototype at the E3 trade fair in May 2004, where at the time, the studio's search for a publisher had begun. Which, in November, became Micro Application for the French release. It was also showcased at E3 of the following year. While the original release of the game was slated for mid to late 2005, in November, it was delayed to February 2006. On January 10, a public demo was released, featuring three courses. Three days later, the French version of the official website was launched, with a German version following suit earlier in November 2005.

Mad Tracks was released in France on February 17, 2006, for Windows, published by Micro Application, in all Auchan supermarkets of the country. Later that same month, it was released in German and published by Frogster Interactive. This was done alongside a patch update, version 1.1. This update fixed bugs, improved performance, graphics cards, controllers and online support. Another patch update, version 1.2, was released on April 20 and improved online multiplayer support, fixed a problem with the game's level of detail for 2D mipmap rendering, added matchmaking and support for non-Western keyboards. On June 13, Mad Tracks was released and published in Russia by Akella. In July, it was released as via digital distribution, published by Element5. In Poland, the game was published by Nicolas Games and released on October 20.

=== Xbox 360 ===
The Xbox 360 port of Mad Tracks was announced in April 2006. It was planned for a release in June. On August 10, the game was delayed and slated for the following year, due to a combination of time and technical difficulties, with online multiplayer support, in addition to the code being rewritten from the ground up to be runnable on Xbox Live Arcade. In January, 2007, the port was shown at The Game's Life conference. (Note: French: La conférence Game's Life) In February and May, D3 Publisher of America, Inc. announced that it will publish the port, alongside RocketBowl (2004) and Puzzle Quest: Challenge of the Warlords (2007), though its release date at the time was unknown. On May 15–17, it was greenlit after being verified and certified by Microsoft Game Studios. It was also confirmed that the game would cost 800 Microsoft points, but the release date was still unknown, until May 29. (Note: Attributed to multiple sources:)

The port was released on Xbox Live Arcade on May 30, 2007. On July 12, a patch was released that fixed a bug that prevented progress in the game and affected some players who could not purchase the full game after first downloading its demo. This was earlier discovered in June by the reports in the Xbox forums, shortly after its initial launch. Denis explained that "a minority of Xbox users suffered from this bug". Two downloadable content packs were produced. Each of these content packs added nine races and six minigames, giving 15 challenges in total. The first was "Bravo" and was released on July 25, 2007, alongside an additional theme, "Crazy Cars". The second was "Encore", which was released on June 27, 2007. (Note: This content pack was not released in both North and South Korea.) In February of 2017, it became backwards compatible with Xbox One.

=== Ports and re-releases ===
A port for the Wii was released in France on December 4, 2009, by Neko Entertainment. It was bundled with the Wii Wheel accessory. A mobile version for the iOS was published by Namco Bandai and released on December 14, 2011. In February 2019, it was reported that the game was delisted from Xbox Live Arcade, following a change in publishing rights from D3 Publisher to Plug In Digital, who would later be handling the new release on Steam. While the Steam version's release date was slated for "early 2020", the page for the game on IndieDB specified that it was meant to be and was released on March 10. Later on June 22, the game was released on Twitch Prime, it was available on the service until July 17.

== Reception ==
Reception

Aggregate scores
Aggregator	Score
GameRankings	(PC): 89% (X360): 61.90% (iOS): 60%
Metacritic	(X360): 62/100

Review scores
Publication	Score
The A.V. Club	(X360): C−
Eurogamer	(X360): 3/10
Gamekult	(PC): 5/10
GameSpot	(X360): 4.6/10
GamesRadar+	(X360): 4/5
IGN	(X360): 6.8/10
Jeuxvideo.com	(PC): 14/20 (Wii): 6/20
Joystick	(PC): 6/10
M! Games	(X360): 50/100
Official Xbox Magazine (US)	(X360): 8/10
PC Games (DE)	(PC): 63/100
Pocket Gamer	(iOS): 3/5
TeamXbox	(X360): 8.5/10

=== Critical response ===
For the PC version, Andreas Altenheimer of Gameswelt criticised the controls, audio, lack of level editor, and graphics, calling the last as "a better shareware game".

==== Xbox 360 version ====
The Xbox 360 version received "mixed or average" reviews according to review aggregator website Metacritic. It was nominated for Best Home Console Game, during the Video Game Festival Award on September of 2007, at Paris in France.

Jonathan Miller, writing for IGN, described Mad Tracks as "a decent racing romp, but you better bring your friends." Greg Sewart of GamesRadar+, praised gameplay, variety of the courses and online support, but criticized visuals, confusing early sections of the courses and a small amount of content in its basic form.

==== Other versions ====
For the Wii version, "Rivaol" of Jeuxvideo was crtitcal about the version. Noting its poor controls, forced use of motion controls. As well, lack of responsiveness of the Wii Wheel accessory, causing "monstrous lag between player movement and the car's response", recommending playing the game with the Nunchuk instead for better handling. Rivaol also criticised AI opponents, finding them to cheat by using items before starting the race and their aggressiveness to the player. Alonghwith the level design and graphics, light weight of the cars and audio.

For the iOS version, Peter Willington from Pocket Gamer praised the game's overall variety of content, multiplayer, and controls, but criticized the visuals, graphics, audio, and items aspect. He also lamented on the grinding required to progress through the game.

=== Sales ===
Mad Tracks was a commercial success. The initial sales during the release of the demo on PC were considered overwhelming by Load Inc. In the first two weeks, it was downloaded 6,000 times in Brazil. GameSpot and CNET Download later relayed it, each getting about 100,000 downloads. As a result, Load Inc. decided to sell the game on their website.

In the following months, however, the sales accelerated. In July 2006, Load Inc. reported that a demo of the game on PC had been downloaded 400,000 times since its release (150,000 of them were made directly from the Load Inc. website). By January 2007, it had sold digitally 100,000 times on PC. Later that same year, in December, it was reported that sales reached over 1.8 million units, and its demo since its release was downloaded 1.2 million times. Six months after the Xbox 360 version's release, the Xbox Live Arcade release had over 630,000 users. In June 2008, Engadget and Yahoo Finance reported that the Xbox 360 version's demo was played 700,000 times and had sold 72,000 units. That same version had been downloaded 1 million times by February 2010.

== Legacy ==
While Mad Tracks failed to gathered much interest from the gaming press, Load Inc. started development on their next game, Things on Wheels, for Xbox 360 in 2008. Released for Xbox Live Arcade on May 12, 2010, it featured a similar premise to Mad Tracks. It was removed from the Xbox 360 store on July 29, 2024, along with over 220 digital titles, making it no longer purchasable nor backward compatible with Xbox Series X and Series S. On June 11, 2008, Load Inc. announced their third game, codenamed "WCTYY" (We Can't Tell You Yet), which was meant to be released on Xbox Live Arcade and PlayStation 3 via PlayStation Network. It was in development circa 2010.

Following the closure of Load Inc., one of its founders, Denis Bourdain, started working at Canard PC as an advertiser. Its staff nicknamed him as "the Little Jacques Séguéla of gaming".
