= Turnip Boy Robs a Bank =

2024 video game

- Developer: Snoozy Kazoo
- Publishers: Graffiti Games; Plug In Digital (Android and iOS)
- Director: Jennifer Kindl
- Producer: Yukon Wainczak
- Programmers: Carson Kompon; Yukon Wainczak
- Artists: Ethan Vance; Pearl Slayton; Jennifer Kindl; Yukon Wainczak
- Writers: Jennifer Kindl; Yukon Wainczak
- Composer: Jake Currier
- Engine: GameMaker
- Platforms: Windows; Xbox One; Nintendo Switch; Android; iOS
- Release: Windows, Xbox One, Nintendo Switch; WW: January 18, 2024; Android, iOS; WW: January 14, 2025
- Genres: Action, Roguelike
- Mode: Single-player

Turnip Boy Robs a Bank is a 2024 action roguelike video game developed by Snoozy Kazoo and published by Graffiti Games. It is the sequel to Turnip Boy Commits Tax Evasion and was released worldwide for Windows, Xbox One, and Nintendo Switch in January 2024. Ports for Android and iOS were released a year later in January 2025, published by Plug In Digital.

== Gameplay ==
After the events of Turnip Boy Commits Tax Evasion, Turnip Boy joins the Pickled Gang and decides to rob a bank. Turnip Boy Robs a Bank is an action game with roguelite elements. Players attempt to get as much money from the bank as possible. After three minutes, the police arrive, and after getting 5 stars, Stinky floods the bank with gas, which can kill Turnip Boy. Between bank robberies, players can purchase items. If Turnip Boy dies during the robbery, he receives less money.

== Development ==
Developer Snoozy Kazoo is based in western Massachusetts. Graffiti Games released Turnip Boy Robs a Bank for Windows, Switch, and Xbox One on January 18, 2024. Android and iOS ports were released a year later on January 14, 2025.

== Reception ==
Reception

Aggregate scores
Aggregator	Score
Metacritic	PC: 82/100; NS: 68/100; XONE: 77/100
OpenCritic	75% recommend

Review scores
Publication	Score
IGN	8/10
Nintendo Life	6/10
Nintendo World Report	7/10
PC Gamer (US)	76/100
Shacknews	9/10
TouchArcade	3/5

The PC and Xbox One releases of Turnip Boy Robs a Bank received "generally favorable" reviews from critics according to the review aggregation website Metacritic. The Nintendo Switch version of the game received "mixed or average" reviews. Fellow review aggregator OpenCritic assessed that the game received strong approval, being recommended by 75% of critics.

IGN praised the combat and "jam-packed world", which they said made it a big improvement over the first game. Shacknews praised the game's rougelite gameplay and faithfulness to the original game's aesthetic and sense of humor. Rock Paper Shotgun said it is not as funny or focused as Turnip Boy Commits Tax Evasion, but they enjoyed the changes to the gameplay. PC Gamer praised the humor and gameplay, but they felt it was too short.

Reviewers criticized the Nintendo Switch version of the game for having performance problems. Jordan Rudek of Nintendo World Report noted that the game regularly experienced framerate drops in more detailed areas of the bank, saying its performance "leaves something to be desired". Shaun Musgrave of TouchArcade also reported having performance issues, adding that they make the game hard to recommend on Switch despite it being generally enjoyable otherwise. Ollie Reynolds of Nintendo Life recommended against buying it on the Switch because of performance problems, but they said it was an easy recommendation if those are fixed.
