= Abandon Ship =

Abandonment of ship is the process of evacuating a maritime vessel.

Abandon Ship may also refer to:

== Music ==
- Abandon Ship (Knife Party album), 2014
- Abandon Ship (Powerman 5000 album), 2024
- Abandon Ship, an album by Lianne Hall, 2006
- "Abandon Ship", a song by Blaggers ITA, 1993
- "Abandon Ship", a song by Busta Rhymes from The Coming, 1996
- "Abandon Ship", a song by Gallows from Orchestra of Wolves, 2006
- "Abandon Ship", a song by Less Than Jake from GNV FLA, 2008
- "Abandon Ship", a song by Simon Chylinski from Subnautica, 2018

== Other uses ==
- Abandon Ship!, or Seven Waves Away, a 1957 British drama film
- Abandon Ship (video game), a 2018 strategy game
- "Abandon Ship!" (Pokémon), a 2003 TV episode
