= ChromaGun =

2015 video game

- Logo
- Developer: Pixel Maniacs
- Publisher: Pixel Maniacs
- Producer: Benjamin Lochmann
- Designer: Steven Crouse
- Programmers: Andreas Scholz; Johann Bauer; Chris Hinze; Alexandru Ciocea
- Artists: Steven Crouse; Valerij Müller; Caroline Kachler
- Composer: Stephan Gembler
- Engine: Unity
- Platforms: MacOS; Microsoft Windows; Linux; PlayStation 4 Xbox One; Nintendo Switch
- Release: iOS; September 13, 2015; Microsoft Windows, MacOS, Linux; February 16, 2016; Playstation 4; August 22, 2017; Xbox One; August 23, 2017; Nintendo Switch; January 22, 2018
- Genres: First-person shooter, puzzle
- Mode: Single-player

ChromaGun is a first-person shooter puzzle video game developed by Pixel Maniacs, an independent game studio from Germany.

A sequel, ChromaGun 2: Dye Hard, was released on February 12, 2026 for Microsoft Windows, Nintendo Switch 2, PlayStation 5, and Xbox Series X/S.

== Gameplay ==
ChromaGun is a puzzle game revolving around using colors. The player uses the ChromaGun, a paint-shooting weapon, to colorize walls and floating spherical robots, called Worker Droids. These Worker Droids are attracted to walls of the same color and will move towards them.

The player's objective is to solve puzzles by cleverly rearranging Worker Droids, changing their colors, and guiding them to door-opening triggers, switches or electrified tiles. The player can shoot paint in the primary colors red, blue and yellow using the ChromaGun. The primary colors can be mixed together on walls and Worker Droids to create the secondary colors green, purple and orange. Mixing more than two different colors will result in black, which Worker Droids are not attracted to.

The game consists of many short puzzle levels to solve, but a single mistake can render a puzzle unsolvable, forcing to restart the level. There are 26 levels in total, each with only one solution.

== Reception ==
Reception

Aggregate score
Aggregator	Score
Metacritic	(PS4) 74/100 (NS) 69/100

Review scores
Publication	Score
Destructoid	6/10
Nintendo Life	8/10
Nintendo World Report	6/10
Push Square	7/10

On Metacritic, the Nintendo Switch version has a score of 69/100 based on 14 reviews, and the PlayStation 4 version has a score of 74/100 based on 10 reviews. indicating "mixed or average reviews".

== See also ==
- Portal
- Portal 2
- Q.U.B.E.
