= Abandon Ship (video game) =

2018 video game

- Developer: Fireblade Software
- Publisher: Plug In Digital
- Platforms: Windows, Linux, Mac, iOS
- Release: Windows: WW: 21 February 2018; Mac, Linux: WW: 30 August 2019; iOS: WW: 25 March 2022
- Genre: Strategy
- Mode: Single-player

Abandon Ship is a strategy video game developed by Fireblade Software and published 2018 for Windows and in 2019 for Mac and Linux by Plug In Digital. Set in the Age of Sail, the player manages a ship's crew as they explore the ocean and fight other ships and mythological monsters. Development of Abandon Ship was led by Gary Burchall, a former member of Climax Studios. The game received average to mixed reviews from critics, with many reviewers comparing it with the 2012 game FTL: Faster Than Light.

== Gameplay ==
Combat in Abandon Ship is undertaken by allocating crew members to different parts of the ship.

Abandon Ship is a narrative-based strategy game in which the player creates a character who escapes from prison and captains a crew of a vessel escaping from a cult that worships a monster named the Kraken. The player navigates the vessel on a procedurally-generated map, containing random ports, event locations and enemies. The player will be required to encounter and survive a set of events before they can pass a gate to the next area, which may include naval combat or encountering a monster. Combat is undertaken with a crew management system in which the player allocates crew members to parts of the ship for them to function, including to fire different cannons, repair the hull, or heal other crew members.

== Development ==
Abandon Ship was created by British independent studio Fireblade Software, founded by Gary Burchall, a former executive producer for Climax Studios who had previously worked on projects including Assassin's Creed Chronicles. Development commenced in January 2016, with Burchall citing a desire to create a game using the roguelike mechanics of the 2012 game FTL: Faster Than Light themed around the era of the Age of Sail. The graphic design and presentation of the game aimed to strike a balance between realistic and fictional depictions of piracy. Burchall stated that the game's visual style was inspired by historical oil paintings, whilst also influenced by fictional depictions including Master and Commander, Pirates of the Caribbean, and supernatural works including the Cthulhu Mythos. Development of Abandon Ship was supported by a grant under the UK Games Fund.

== Reception ==
Reception

Review scores
Publication	Score
148Apps	3.5/5
GameReactor	7/10

Abandon Ship received average to mixed reviews from critics, with many evaluating the merits of the game in comparison to FTL: Faster Than Light. Critics were mixed on the gameplay mechanics and loop. Eurogamer praised the game's "well-realized" crew management system as expanding on the formula of FTL, finding it "involved" and with a greater "sense of immediacy" than its counterpart. GameReactor noted the game featured a "fair amount of grind", but highlighted the "gentle challenge" and "tactical battles" as an "enjoyable experience" overall. Rock Paper Shotgun found the gameplay loop to lack variation and "meaningful" consequences, citing the game's "repetitive events" removing the "illusion of their significance".

Critics were also mixed on the game's visual presentation. Dual Shockers highlighted the game's "oil painting" design and believed it helped the game "stand out when compared to games in the same genre". 148 Apps described the graphics as "polygonal" and "rough". Similarly, PC Gamer noted that "the sea mats are pretty, but they're canvases for icons, not rich play spaces unto themselves".
