= Bury Me, My Love =

2017 visual novel

- Developer: The Pixel Hunt
- Publishers: Arte France; Plug In Digital
- Producer: Florent Maurin
- Designer: Florent Maurin
- Programmer: Paul Joannon
- Writer: Pierre Corbinais
- Engine: MonoGame
- Platforms: Android; iOS; Nintendo Switch; Windows
- Release: Android, iOS; 25 October 2017; Switch, Windows; 10 January 2019
- Genre: Visual novel
- Mode: Single-player

Bury Me, My Love (Note: Bury Me, My Love is a Syrian goodbye phrase. Originally also "Enterre moi, mon Amour") is a visual novel developed by The Pixel Hunt and published by Arte France. The story follows Syrian couple Nour and Majd as Nour tries to flee the Syrian civil war to Europe.

== Gameplay ==
The player chooses Majd's texting replies to Nour and gives her advice.

== Development ==
The game was developed by French studio The Pixel Hunt with design studio Figs and was published by Arte France for Android and iOS on 25 October 2017. The Nintendo Switch and Windows versions were released on 10 January 2019 by Playdius Entertainment. A free prequel was made available on the website on November 3. It uses interactive fiction language ink by Inkle.

== Reception ==
Pocket Gamer called it a "must-play" for its emotional storytelling, but criticised the Switch conversion. Polygon recommended it for its "brilliant storytelling". GameSpot praised it for exploring "uncharted territory", but criticised replaying choices to be tedious.

At the British Academy Games Awards 2018, it was nominated for Best Mobile Game and Game Beyond Entertainment. It was nominated for Games for Impact at the 2017 Game Awards. At the International Mobile Game Awards 2018, it won Best Meaningful Play.
