= Ashwalkers =

2021 video game

- Developer: Nameless XIII
- Publisher: Dear Villagers
- Director: Matteo Gaulmier
- Engine: Unity
- Platforms: Microsoft Windows, Nintendo Switch
- Release: 15 April 2021; Nintendo Switch: 10 March 2022
- Genre: Survival
- Mode: Single-player

Ashwalkers (Note: French: Cendres) is a survival game developed by Nameless XIII and published by Dear Villagers. It was released for Microsoft Windows on 15 April 2021 and Nintendo Switch on 10 March 2022.

== Gameplay ==
The player manages a group of survivors and makes decision through text options.

== Development ==
Ashwalkers was announced by Dear Villagers in August 2020 during Gamescom. Toulouse-based developer Nameless XIII was backed by Dontnod Entertainment co-founder Hervé Bonin, which was founded by former École de Photographie à Toulouse (ETPA) students in November 2018.

The game was released for Microsoft Windows on 15 April 2021 and Nintendo Switch on 10 March 2022.

== Reception ==
Reception

Aggregate scores
Aggregator	Score
Metacritic	(PC) 61/100 (NS) 54/100
OpenCritic	29% recommend

Review score
Publication	Score
Shacknews	7/10

Ashwalkers received "Mixed or Average" reviews according to review aggregator website Metacritic, receiving a score of 61/100 based on 26 reviews. Fellow review aggregator OpenCritic assessed that the game received weak approval, being recommended by 29% of critics. Ozzie Mejia of Shacknews enjoyed the "meaningful choices". Edge found it underwhelming. Benjamin Schmädig of 4Players criticised the game as superficial.
