= Turnip Boy Commits Tax Evasion =

2021 video game

- Developer: Snoozy Kazoo
- Publishers: Graffiti Games; Plug In Digital (Android and iOS)
- Engine: Unity
- Platforms: Linux; macOS; Windows; Nintendo Switch; Xbox One; iOS; Android; PlayStation 4
- Release: Linux, macOS, Windows, Nintendo Switch April 22, 2021; Xbox One April 19, 2022; iOS, Android May 24, 2022; PlayStation 4 December 20, 2022
- Genre: Action-adventure
- Mode: Single-player

Turnip Boy Commits Tax Evasion is a 2021 action-adventure video game developed by Snoozy Kazoo and published by Graffiti Games and Plug In Digital. It was released for Linux, macOS, Windows, and Nintendo Switch in April 2021. The game was also released for Xbox One in April 2022, for iOS and Android in May 2022, and for PlayStation 4 in December 2022. The player is placed in the role of an anthropomorphic turnip who evades taxes in an effort to fight a corrupt vegetable government. A sequel, titled Turnip Boy Robs a Bank, was released for Nintendo Switch, Microsoft Windows, and Xbox One on January 18, 2024, and a prequel, titled Turnip Boy Steals the Mail, was announced on May 4, 2025.

== Gameplay ==
The player controls Turnip Boy, an anthropomorphic turnip who has been convicted of tax evasion, and must go on a quest to stop a corrupt mayor. The game is played from a top-down perspective and features a variety of areas to explore. The controls are similar to roguelike games, with a basic health system and hack and slash combat. Turnip Boy has an inventory containing a variety of items, which can include quest items, tools, and weapons, and can equip one at a time. Equippable items can be used in any direction, and position is determined by player input, such as mouse position. Turnip Boy can engage in combat with various enemies, in which he has a limited amount of hearts, and dies upon losing them all, but will respawn at the last checkpoint. Boss battles typically consist of attacking the boss directly with a weapon or utilizing a gimmick commonly used in the area where the boss was found. Defeating bosses grants important items that can unlock new areas.

Along his journey, Turnip Boy may complete various side quests to gain items or earn achievements. Various non-player characters can be interacted with, often either providing said quests or adding to the game's overall narrative.

== Plot ==
Turnip Boy, owner of a greenhouse, receives a tax bill from Mayor Onion, which he rips up. Mayor Onion accuses him of evading his taxes and sends him on various errands as penance, during which Turnip Boy, with help from an avocado named Annie, discovers the history of their world, which implies there was a nuclear holocaust that killed all humans and began mutating vegetables into sentient bipedal beings.

Once Turnip Boy completes all errands, Mayor Onion locks him out of the greenhouse; Old Man Lemon then reveals that Turnip Boy's father, Don Turnipchino, was once a mighty mafia crime boss, with Mayor Onion and Old Man Lemon being his associates. Old Man Lemon confides to Turnip Boy that there's a secret underground base underneath the greenhouse and allows Turnip Boy to sneak in. Turnip Boy confronts and defeats the corrupt Mayor Onion, and reclaims the deed for his greenhouse – which he then rips up.

== Reception ==
Reception

Aggregate scores
Aggregator	Score
Metacritic	72/100 (PC); 74/100 (Switch)
OpenCritic	42% recommend

Review scores
Publication	Score
GameSpot	7/10
Nintendo Life	8/10
Nintendo World Report	6.5/10
Shacknews	8/10
TouchArcade	4/5

The game received generally mixed reviews. On Metacritic, the game has a score of 72% and 74% on PC and Nintendo Switch respectively, indicating "mixed or average" reception. Fellow review aggregator OpenCritic assessed that the game received fair approval, being recommended by 42% of critics.

In his review, David Wildgoose of GameSpot praised the game's "relentlessly silly script" and was "positively surprised" by its puzzles, whilst criticizing the controls and noting that not all of its humor "quite lands". Nintendo Life's Ollie Reynolds called the gameplay "relatively pleasant for the most part", enjoyed the game's tone and dialogue, but felt that the sword's controls were floaty at times and that "the heavy reliance on social media references" for the jokes "may not vibe" with some. Jordan Rudek of Nintendo World Report similarly praised the charm and humor, but felt the game's puzzles lacked depth, that "much of the action [felt] repetitive and its story was too short". That sentiment was echoed by Shacknews editor Donovan Erskine, who praised the humor, dungeon-crawling and puzzle solving elements as well as the "fleshed-out universe", but wished the game had a "quest log or similar feature". TouchArcade's Shaun Musgrave gave a positive review of 4/5, having enjoyed the "goofy tone", controls, the game's "cartoony look" and gameplay, but added that people who "don't like memes or absurd jokes" would have a bad time.

Several reviewers compared the game's mechanics to games in the Legend of Zelda video game series, with Nintendo World Report in particular calling it a "Zelda-lite".
