= Born of Bread =

2023 video game

- Developer: WildArts
- Publisher: Plug In Digital
- Engine: Unreal Engine 4
- Platforms: Windows, Nintendo Switch, PlayStation 5, Xbox Series
- Release: WW: 5 December 2023
- Genre: RPG
- Mode: Single-player

Born of Bread is a 2023 video game developed by French Canadian independent developer WildArts and published by Plug In Digital. It is an action-RPG in which players fight enemies as a batch of bread that has been brought to life named Loaf. The developers aimed to create a game evocative of Paper Mario: The Thousand Year Door, creating a similar visual style that merges two and three dimensional graphics. Upon release, the game received average reviews.

== Gameplay ==
Gameplay

The player assumes the role of Loaf, an animated being of dough created when the Kingdom's royal baker accidentally creates life when creating a new type of bread. Loaf is tasked to venture out and defeat five demons that have been awakened by archaeologists and have taken over the castle. Born of Bread is an action-RPG in which players explore the world to battle foes and interact with characters to progress the narrative. The game features turn-based combat, in which players can direct Loaf and their allies to attack enemies or perform supporting actions by using WP. Battles are broadcast before a fictional audience, and players can perform the requests of audience members to recover WP. Upgrades can be made to improve combat abilities by improving stats from experience points earned from battle, or completing side quests to earn Boons that enhance certain abilities in battle.

Queen asks the kingdom's royal baker to create a new bread dish for dinner.

== Development and release ==
Born of Bread was created by WildArts, a four-person French Canadian independent development team. The game was the second by the studio after the 2017 title Helltown. Lead designer Nicolas La Marche stated that the studio set out to create a RPG for the first time and aimed to emulate Paper Mario: The Thousand Year Door as an exemplar of the genre. The studio focused on innovating on the formula of the genre, taking a more open-world structure to Paper Mario to encourage greater exploration. To achieve the resemblance, the developers merged two-dimensional and three-dimensional animation for the game's art style. Bread was focused on as a theme as a hook to create a protagonist with "versatile and interesting" abilities that could "interact with the environment" in clever ways. The game was creating using the UE4 Blueprints engine, and received an Epic Games grant as an Unreal Engine project. Born of Bread was showcased at the Microsoft ID@Xbox Fall Showcase in September 2022. A game demo was also released for Steam Next Fext in June 2023. The game was released on 5 December 2023.

== Reception ==
Reception

Aggregate scores
Aggregator	Score
Metacritic	69%
OpenCritic	71% recommend

Review scores
Publication	Score
Nintendo Life	7.4/10
Nintendo World Report	6/10
RPGFan	71%
TouchArcade	3.5/5
CG Magazine	6/10
Digitally Downloaded	2/5
Nintendojo	C+
Siliconera	8/10

Born of Bread received "mixed or average" reviews, according to review aggregator platform Metacritic. Fellow review aggregator OpenCritic assessed that the game received fair approval, being recommended by 71% of critics. Comparing the game's visual presentation to Paper Mario: The Thousand Year Door, Rock Paper Shotgun praised the game's "colorful" graphics and "buoyant" music, but cautioned that players could differ on whether they enjoyed the humor.
