= Splasher (video game) =

2017 video game

- Developer: Splashteam
- Publishers: Dear Villagers; Plug In Digital
- Designer: Romain Claude
- Programmer: Romain Claude
- Artist: Richard Vatinel
- Composers: Aymeric Schwartz; David Boitier
- Engine: Unity
- Platforms: Linux; MacOS; Microsoft Windows; Nintendo Switch; PlayStation 4; Xbox One
- Release: February 7, 2017: MacOS, Microsoft Windows, Linux; WW: February 7, 2017; PlayStation 4, Xbox One; NA: September 26, 2017; EU: September 27, 2017; Nintendo Switch; WW: October 26, 2017
- Genre: Platform
- Mode: Single-player

Splasher is a 2017 platform game developed by Splashteam and published by Dear Villagers. Players control a purple-haired Inkorp employee, who needs to save splashers from the evil Docteur, who wants to do deadly experiments on them. It was released on February 7, 2017, for Linux, MacOS, and Microsoft Windows. Ports for the Xbox One, PlayStation 4, and Nintendo Switch were released later the same year, which were published by Plug In Digital. The game received generally favorable reviews from critics.

== Gameplay ==
=== Main campaign ===
In the game, players control a character who runs through a factory.

Splasher is a 2D platform game in which the player controls a purple-haired character who has to go through 22 levels, all of which take place inside of the Inkorp factory and involve the use of the splasher's paint gun. Each of the levels consist of seven of the protagonist's fellow workers to collect, which are known as splashers. Six of the splashers are hidden throughout the levels, while the seventh is at the end of every level and requires 700 'Golden Ink', which is also found throughout the levels.

Splasher was made through a collaboration with speedrunners and built around speed, so players will be able to complete levels quickly.

=== Other modes ===
Apart from the main story, the game has additional speedrun and time attack modes.

In the speedrun mode, players needed to complete each level from start to finish as fast as possible. The game consists of three types of speedrun types, with the first type being the "Selfish Speedrun", which doesn't require the player to get any collectables. The second type is called the "Standard Speedrun", which features collectables that players can get throughout their playthrough. The third and final speedrun is called "Gotta Catch 'em All", which plays the role as a 100% speedrun in which it requires the player to get all of the collectables.

The time attack mode has players completing individual levels within a short amount. The developers describe time attack as "a training to the speedrun modes."

Players are also able to post their scores on the leaderboards for both modes.

== Plot ==
The game follows the story of a 'Splasher', who works at a paint production known as Inkorp. On one of his shifts, he sets eyes on an experiment being performed by Docteur, the evil villain in charge of the factory, and accidentally sees the ongoing experiments being performed on his fellow Splashers. After noticing and managing to make a narrow escape, he decides to save the rest of his co-workers from their fate, in a daring rescue mission that sees the player venture through the entire complex of Inkorp.

== Development and release ==
Splasher was developed by Splashteam, a studio founded by former members of Ubisoft Montpellier who have worked on Rayman and Rabbids. Creative director Romain Claude received an Advanced Degree in Game Design and Production Management between 2006 and 2008. After graduating he became a designer at Ubisoft and he worked with them until he left in 2012. When he left he started working on the game alongside his friend Richard Vatinel, a 2D artist and animator who he met at school in 2006.

Development of Splasher began in 2013. It was inspired by a prototype Claude developed to test blood properties. It was also inspired by a student project called "Power of Paint", which inspired the paint mechanics in Portal 2. Claude wanted to use the same mechanics but in 2D. Claude wanted to develop the game using an engine he was developing using XNA Framework, but colleagues at Ubisoft suggested him to use Unity instead. Splasher went through an extensive prototyping phase with multiple prototypes on Romain's Itch.io page.

In May 2016, Splashteam announced that they were working on new features for the game before its release, as well as a release for consoles. The team was looking at a launch window between the end of 2016 and early 2017.

In December 2016, the developers launched pre-orders for the game's collector's edition, which features access to the game's demo, as well as the official soundtrack and other benefits. The pre-order was announced along with a trailer and a release date set for February 7, 2017.

Splasher was released for Windows, macOS, and Linux on February 7, 2017. The PlayStation 4 and Xbox One versions were released on September 26, 2017, in North America and was then released in Europe the next day. The game was released for Nintendo Switch in October the same year. Although the game wasn't a commercial success, it was met with favorable reviews at launch, which led to them releasing their next game titled Tinykin.

== Reception ==
Reception

Aggregate score
Aggregator	Score
Metacritic	PC: 79/100; PS4: 82/100; NS: 83/100

Review scores
Publication	Score
Destructoid	9/10
Hardcore Gamer	3.5/5
Nintendo Life	8/10

Splasher received "generally favorable reviews" from critics on Metacritic.

Kevin Mersereau of Destructoid stated that, "The shadow of Super Meat Boy can be felt in almost every aspect of this game, but it introduces enough new mechanics to really make itself stand out from its inspirations." He then said, "The Switch may be jam-packed with quality eShop titles right now, but Splasher is genuinely something special."

Nintendo Life's Mitch Vogel stated, "Created by some staff that worked on the likes Rayman Legends and Rayman Origins, Splasher works as a brilliant callback to that style of twitch platforming while adding in a little bit of Splatoon to make something that's rather fresh."

Hardcore Gamer said, "For a first title, Splashteam has shown that they are more than capable of bringing some original ideas to one of gaming’s oldest genres." He later stated that "The action-packed levels offer plenty of surprises to keep players on their toes, even if a few fall flat, and the brightly colored presentation further benefits the unique title."
