= Dungeon Souls =

2015 roguelike video game

- Developer: Lamina Studios
- Publisher: Plug In Digital
- Directors: April Gianan, Diogo Braga, Igor Grincu
- Producer: April Gianan
- Designer: Mike Reñevo
- Composers: Unfamiliar Identity, Joe O'Quinn, Christopher van Eijk, David Viano
- Engine: GameMaker: Studio
- Platforms: Microsoft Windows, Linux, macOS
- Release: WW: December 2, 2016
- Genres: Roguelike, adventure
- Modes: Single-player, multiplayer

Dungeon Souls is a roguelike adventure video game developed by Lamina Studios, and published by Plug In Digital. (Note: Originally published by Black Shell Media, whose publishing business was bought by Plug In Digital.) The game was released on July 7, 2015 for Microsoft Windows in Early Access. Players select from one of 6 characters and travel throughout the game vanquishing enemies, slaying monsters, and collecting items.

== Gameplay ==
Dungeon Souls is a strategic real-time monster slaying and dungeon crawling adventure set in a retro, pixelated world. The game puts players in control of one of six playable characters, with the goal of traversing vast dungeons. After selecting a character, the player is thrust in the game world and is encouraged to activate all of the seals the sprawling dungeon before being led to the floor down to the next dungeon. On their adventure, players must defeat many different types of enemies, ranging from slimes, to skeletons and deadly traps. The game has permadeath, so when the player dies in the game, there is no option to respawn.

== Reception ==
Rock Paper Shotgun's Marsh Davies applauds the smooth gameplay and character classes, stating "It's splashy, frantic and hugely enjoyable, and its classes are constructed with smart consideration of their asymmetry." He goes on to indicate that the design elements of the game borrow heavily from similar roguelikes, stating "Dungeon Souls makes no bones about that extent to which it borrows from its forebears, but, in its particular arrangement of classes, does offer a distinct tactical flavour of its own."

Hardcore Gamer's James Cunningham heavily praises the game's execution, stating "It's an irresistible gameplay loop when done well, and Dungeon Souls quickly sinks its hooks in and doesn't let go."
