= The Splatters =

2012 video game

- Developer: SpikySnail Games
- Publisher: Microsoft Studios
- Platforms: Xbox 360, Windows, OS X, Linux
- Release: Xbox 360; April 11, 2012; Windows, OS X June 26, 2013; Linux; 2014
- Genre: Puzzle
- Mode: Single-player

The Splatters is a physics based puzzle video game for the Xbox 360's Xbox Live Arcade. It was developed by Israeli studio SpikySnail Games and published by Microsoft Studios. The Splatters was released on April 11, 2012. A PC port was released in 2013 titled Super Splatters. The Splatters was originally going to be called "Confetti Carnival", however the name was changed prior to release. The game received positive to mixed reviews from critics.

== Gameplay ==
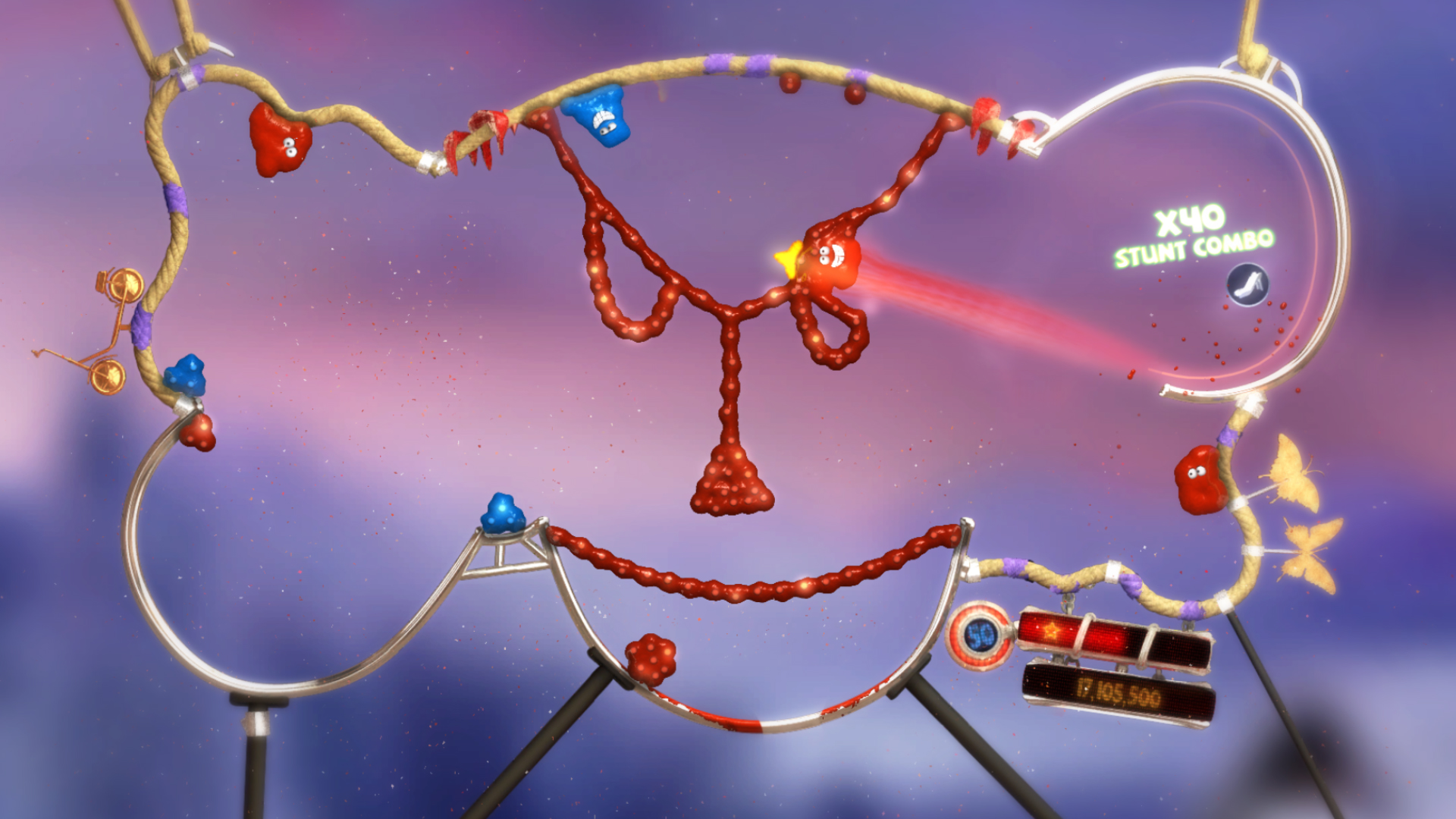
Screenshot of The Splatters in play

The Splatters is a physics based puzzle video game that tasks players with using anthropomorphized globs of goo to clear bombs scattered across each level. When the globs of goo break from contact with an obstacle in the level, they split open, spilling colored goo that causes bombs to detonate once they become coated in the goo. Both the globs of goo and the bombs have different colors, and bombs can only be destroyed by goo from globs of the same color. Players have a small number of irregular launches and other methods of changing the game's physics, called "stunts", to aid in clearing levels.

The game has three modes: Become a Talent, Combo Nation, and Master Shots. Become a Talent includes tutorials and twelve regular levels, and introduces players to the gameplay and stunts. Completing it unlocks the Combo Nation mode, which has 21 levels, and the Master Shots mode, which has 32. Combo Nation tasks players with stringing together long combinations, detonating bombs by launching globs and destroying bombs in rapid succession. Master Shots gives the player only one glob and specific maneuvers that must be done. After each level, players are graded on their performance and given up to three stars.

== Reception ==
Reception

Aggregate scores
Aggregator	Score
GameRankings	73.78%
Metacritic	72 (360); 73 (PC)

Review scores
Publication	Score
Game Informer	8.0/10
GameRevolution	4/5
GameSpot	7.0/10
GamesRadar+	3/5
Official Xbox Magazine (US)	8.5/10

The Splatters received positive to mixed reviews upon release, and has a Metacritic score of 72. Several reviewers compared the game to Angry Birds. Kyle Hilliard of Game Informer called the mechanics a "cross between Angry Birds and Peggle in all the right ways", while Jason Venter of GameSpot labeled The Splatters as "derivative". Venter praised the ability for players to upload scores and game play videos as a "nice touch that adds a strong competitive element to a single-player game". Kevin Schaller of Game Revolution praised the accuracy of the game's controls, as well as the game's visuals, which he described as "somewhere between traditional animation and claymation in appearance". Several reviewers, however, had complaints about the game's consistency. Ventner of GameSpot complained that trying the same thing three times would often yield three different results, while Kyle Hilliard of Game Informer lamented how much of a factor luck played in the game. Lorenzo Veloria of GamesRadar felt that the game was too repetitive, and that the Combo Nation felt "less like a puzzle and more like an exercise in trial and error", coming to the conclusion that the game was better suited for phones than the console.

== Super Splatters ==
On September 4, 2012, Indie Fund announced that they would be providing financial backing to SpikySnail Games' effort to create a port of The Splatters for Windows, Mac, and Linux, with the aim of helping get the studio to a point where they would be financially self-sustaining. On March 13, 2013, SpikySnail Games announced on their blog that the port, called Super Splatters, was almost complete and would be playable at PAX East.

Super Splatters was released via Steam on June 26, 2013.
