= The Collage Atlas =

2020 video game

- Developer(s): John William Evelyn
- Publisher(s): Robot House
- Engine: Unity
- Platform(s): iOS, macOS, tvOS, Windows
- Release: iOS, macOS, tvOS; WW: October 16, 2020; Windows; WW: April 19, 2024
- Genre(s): Adventure
- Mode(s): Single-player

The Collage Atlas is an adventure game developed by John William Evelyn and published by Robot House Games. It was released in 2020 for iOS, macOS, and tvOS through Apple Arcade, but was delisted in 2023. A Windows port was released in 2024.

== Gameplay ==
Players explore a hand-drawn picture-book landscape, revealing hidden phrases.

== Development ==
John William Evelyn developed The Collage Atlas himself. He had created amateur Adobe Flash games when younger and returned to game development while working at media agencies. After making tie-in games, he decided to work exclusively on game development. The themes explored – agency and powerlessness – came from a difficult period in his life, which he did not see explored to his satisfaction in others' works. The game started as an app that was meant to accompany a book, but he refocused on the game after receiving encouragement at EGX and seeing agency as a theme more appropriate for a video game. Evelyn created the visuals over the next five years by designing models in Unity, illustrating printed versions, and scanning the completed art back in as a texture.

The Collage Atlas was initially released via Apple Arcade for macOS, iOS, and AppleTV on October 16, 2020. Despite player interest and a grant from the UK Games Fund, Evelyn said he had trouble finding a publisher. When Apple showed interest in the game, Evelyn said everything else fell into place, and he acquired a publisher. Evelyn's contract with Apple expired in 2023, and it became unplayable. Evelyn saw this as a video game preservation issue. He ported The College Atlas to Windows and released it on Steam.

== Reception ==
The Guardian and Multiplayer.it both praised the art, though both felt the writing does not live up to the artwork.
