= Roto Force =

- Developer: Accidently Awesome
- Publishers: PID Games; East2West Games
- Designer: Anton Klinger
- Platforms: Android; iOS; Linux; macOS; Windows
- Release: WW: Jul 18, 2023
- Genre: Twin-stick shooter
- Mode: Single-player

Roto Force is a twin-stick shooter video game developed by Accidently Awesome. PID Games and East2West published it for mobile devices and personal computers in 2023.

== Gameplay ==
Players progress through levels that consist of small, enclosed spaces in which they are restricted to staying within the edges. Players can attack their enemies using twin-stick shooter controls and must avoid enemy waves of enemy attacks, as in bullet hell games. To avoid attacks, players can dash around the level, essentially teleporting to the opposite side. New weapons are unlocked on each level, and dying returns players to a checkpoint.

== Development ==
Austrian developer Anton Klinger initially made Roto Force as an entry in a game jam for Game Boy-style games. PID Games and East2West Games released it for Windows, macOS, Linux, Android, and iOS on Jul 18, 2023.

== Reception ==
Eurogamer praised its gameplay, which they said make it feel "new and weird" in a good way. TouchArcade called it one of the polished games on iOS and praised the "slick controls, excellent haptics, [...] amazing gameplay [...] and memorable writing". TechRadar included it in their list of the best Android games, calling it "claustrophobic and intense".

Roto Force won the jury award for best mobile game at the 2022 Game Development World Championship.
