= Things on Wheels =

2010 video game

- Cover art of Xbox 360 version
- Developer: Load Inc.
- Publisher: Focus Home Interactive
- Platform: Xbox 360
- Release: May 12, 2010
- Genre: Racing
- Modes: Single-player, multiplayer

Things on Wheels (Note: Abbreviated as TOW) is a 2010 racing game developed by the indie developer Load Inc. and published by Focus Entertainment.

The game was released on May 12, 2010, for the Xbox 360 via Xbox Live Arcade. It has been met with a negative reception by most critics upon release, for its gameplay and graphics. It was removed from the Xbox 360 stores on July 29, 2024, along with over 220 digital titles on Microsoft's system, making it no longer purchasable. It was not backward compatible with Xbox Series X/S.

== Gameplay ==
Example of the gameplay in Things on Wheels

In Things on Wheels, players control remote control cars in racing competitions. Many races have a non-linear track design, where the player can choose from pathways that may branch to shortcuts or secrets. They can collect one of four power-ups (freeze, shield, static shocker, or speed boost) that give temporary abilities.

Single-player mode has players race against a CPU player. Outside the game, players may use a sandbox mode to freely learn tracks, their layout and controls of the cars.

== Development ==
Following the completion and release of Mad Tracks (2006), and its port for the Xbox Live Arcade, the studio began development of the project. Its innovation in the racing game genre was the non-linear track design. Some concepts and gameplay mechanics like camera setting and track editor were considered but scrapped in the final game. While the reason for the latter was unknown, the first studio couldn't find its useful purpose in the game. Microsoft Windows' version of the game was planned to be released along with Xbox 360 version, but it was cancelled for unknown reason.

== Release ==
Things on Wheels had met with numerous delays before release. The first time the game was announced was in January 2008, by its first publisher, SouthPeak Games, with one screenshot of a game and a release date of summer of that year. In April, a short teaser trailer was released. According to the art director of Load Inc., Herve Nedelec, the trailer was short intentionally, but long enough to get a feeling for its races and the discovery of the huge house inside and outside. Later that same year, screenshots of RC classes were revealed. The game was released on Xbox Live Arcade on May 12, 2010. It was removed from the stores along with over 220 digital titles on Microsoft's system on July 29, 2024, making it no longer purchasable. It was not included to be backward compatible with Xbox Series X/S.

== Reception ==
Reception

Aggregate score
Aggregator	Score
Metacritic	41/100

Review scores
Publication	Score
GamePro	2/5
GameSpot	5/10
IGN	4/10
Jeuxvideo.com	6/20
Official Xbox Magazine (US)	4.5/10

Things on Wheels received mostly negative reviews from critics. According to Metacritic, the game has a "generally unfavorable" rating of 41, based on 11 critics. Jack DeVries of IGN criticized the game's CPU players' faultiness and stated the single-player campaign was "boring" with a "poorly written" story.

Graphics were mostly viewed negatively by multiple critics. Jack DeVries of IGN expressed that he saw other Indie games looking better than TOW, by the time when it was released. The darkness of it was also criticized by Brett Todd of GameSpot, as it would "often obscure track hazards". Jeuxvideo.com described it as "bland and tasteless, and the scenery has no style whatsoever. It's truly ugly, both in a technical and artistic sense."

The AI/CPU opponents were widely criticized.

== See also ==
- Re-Volt
