= Edge of Eternity (video game) =

2021 video game

- Developer: Midgar Studio
- Publisher: Dear Villagers
- Composers: Cedric Menendez; Yasunori Mitsuda
- Platforms: Windows; PlayStation 4; PlayStation 5; Xbox One; Xbox Series X/S; Nintendo Switch
- Release: June 8, 2021: Windows; June 8, 2021; PS4, PS5, Xbox One, Series X/S; February 10, 2022; Switch; February 23, 2022
- Genre: Role-playing
- Mode: Single-player

Edge of Eternity is a 2021 role-playing video game developed by Midgar Studio and published by Dear Villagers. It first released for Windows before releasing on PlayStation 4, PlayStation 5, Xbox One, Xbox Series X/S, and Nintendo Switch in February 2022.

In February 2025, it was announced a sequel Edge of Memories is currently in development.

== Gameplay ==
Players control Daryon, a young soldier whose world has been invaded by a technologically advanced race. When Daryon learns that his mother has been infected with an alien biological agent, he deserts his post to help his sister find a cure. Gameplay is influenced by JRPGs and includes elements of tactical role-playing games. It features hex grids and Active Time Battle, a form of turn-based combat used in the Final Fantasy series. The open world setting includes both science fiction and fantasy tropes, mixing together robots and magic. Free updates have added a dungeon with 50 procedurally generated levels, a New Game Plus mode, and other features.

== Development ==
Edge of Eternity was developed by Midgar Studio, a French studio which is named after the fictional city of the same name from the 1997 video game Final Fantasy VII and which released parkour game Hover in 2017. Crowdfunding was announced in 2013, and the game entered early access in November 2018. The developers cited a desire to add voice acting and hear feedback from players. The Windows version was released on June 8, 2021. Ports for the PlayStation 4, PlayStation 5, Xbox One, Xbox Series X/S and Nintendo Switch (via cloud support) was released on February 10, 2022. The game's score was composed by Cedric Menendez, and Yasunori Mitsuda provided six tracks.

== Reception ==
Reception

Aggregate score
Aggregator	Score
Metacritic	PC: 67/100; PS5: 60/100

Review scores
Publication	Score
Famitsu	27/40
Hardcore Gamer	3.5/5
Push Square	5/10
RPGFan	80/100

The game received "mixed or average reviews" according to Metacritic. RPGamer said the game "comes from a place of love", but Midgar Studio was too ambitious, resulting in many features that do not live up their initial promise. Although they praised the game's "stunning backdrops", they said there is little to do in the areas, and they found the combat to be repetitive and sometimes unbalanced. The story also showed promise to them, but they found the siblings unlikable and their quest to be "an uninspired journey". Describing it as "a love letter to classic Final Fantasy and Xenoblade games", Hardcore Gamer said that is "a good but not great JRPG" that "comes close to reaching its ambitious goals". Push Square said the game has interesting characters, beautiful art, and fun tactical battles, but game is too large and ambitious to fulfill the promise of these elements. The reviewer felt that this leaves the world feeling empty and that the battles can seem repetitive. RPGFan praised the game's "wonderfully clever and tactically-minded" combat, which the reviewer found to be the game's highlight. Finding the story to be poorly paced, the reviewer concluded, "Edge of Eternity is a decent yet rough-around-the-edges JRPG-styled game that hints at potential greatness in its later stages."
