= Revita (video game) =

2022 video game

- Developer: BenStar
- Publisher: Dear Villagers
- Engine: GameMaker
- Platforms: Nintendo Switch; Windows; PlayStation 4; PlayStation 5; Xbox One; Xbox Series X/S
- Release: Switch, Windows; WW: April 21, 2022; PS, Xbox; WW: April 20, 2023
- Genre: Platformer
- Mode: Single-player

Revita is a 2022 platform video game developed by BenStar and published by Dear Villagers.

== Gameplay ==
Players control an amnesic child who attempts to recover their memories in a clock tower. Each level is procedurally generated and is based on one of the five stages of grief. Players can trade their health for bonuses, such as increased damage. Health can be recovered by defeating enemies. Revita is a side-scrolling platform game that uses twin-stick shooter controls and has pixel art graphics.

== Development ==
Developer BenStar is based in Germany. with the rest of their small team hailing from all over the globe. After the game entered early access in 2021, Dear Villagers released Revita for Windows and Switch on April 21, 2022. It was released for PlayStation 4, PlayStation 5, Xbox One, and Xbox Series X/S on April 20, 2023. A physical edition, published by Red Art Games, was announced in 2023.

On April 5, 2023, Revita 2.0 was announced, which touted quality of life changes and massive overhauls to the gameplay systems. However, on October 4, 2023, development was halted due to financial concerns, and has since remained in a state of limbo.

== Reception ==
Revita received positive reviews on Metacritic. Push Square praised the amount of unlockable content, music, art, and gameplay. TouchArcade said it is not revolutionary but is a good game. Nintendo World Report praised the art and unlockable content. However, they said Revita provides little direction in the early game, and they found the system of trading health for bonuses stifling.
