= Ape Out =

2019 video game

- Developer: Gabe Cuzzillo
- Publisher: Devolver Digital
- Designer: Gabe Cuzzillo
- Programmer: Gabe Cuzzillo
- Artists: Gabe Cuzzillo; Bennett Foddy
- Composer: Maxi Boch
- Engine: Unity
- Platforms: Windows, Nintendo Switch
- Release: February 28, 2019
- Genre: Beat 'em up
- Mode: Single-player

Ape Out (stylized in all caps) is a 2019 beat 'em up game developed by Gabe Cuzzillo and published by Devolver Digital. Financed by the Indie Fund, it was produced when Cuzzillo attended game development classes at New York University. The game was released for Microsoft Windows and Nintendo Switch on February 28, 2019, and has garnered a positive reception.

== Gameplay ==
Ape Out is a single player beat 'em up video game played from a top-down perspective. The player controls a gorilla running through a maze while evading gun-wielding humans. The enemies can be killed with a single attack, grabbed, or used as a shield. In each level, the player must reach the goal without being killed. The maze design is randomized and is slightly different on each play.

The game also features a minimalist art style, which has been compared to that of Saul Bass.

== Development ==
Ape Out was developed by Gabe Cuzzillo using Unity, a game engine. Ape Out was Cuzzillo's second game after Foiled, which he developed with Aaron Taecker-Wyss and released in 2014. Development on Ape Out began when Cuzzillo attended game development courses at New York University (NYU), where he also worked on an independent study with Bennett Foddy. Foddy contributed to the game's art, while Maxi Boch, an associate professor for NYU's Game Center, worked on the game's music system and sound design. Ape Out was part of the NYU Game Center Incubator and was partially financed by the Indie Fund.

Devolver Digital released a playable trailer for the game in March 2017 and planned to release the game by mid-2017. The publisher announced in December 2018 that Ape Out would be released on February 7, 2019, for Microsoft Windows and Nintendo Switch. However, the game was delayed by three weeks and was released for both platforms on February 28, 2019.

=== Music ===
One of the game's main themes is jazz music, and each of the game's four chapters are represented as jazz albums with each level representing one track. The gameplay features a loud and chaotic, all-percussion jazz soundtrack composed by Maxi Boch (associate arts professor at NYU Game Center) which reacts dynamically to the gameplay, for example by increasing in intensity as the player faces more enemies, crashing cymbals each time an enemy is killed and adjusting the volume according to one's speed and number of kills.

In order to provide a reactive and procedurally generated soundtrack for each playthrough, the game draws from a bank of thousands of recorded individual drum sounds, some recorded by Boch with others sourced externally, and combines them according to player movement. The system will also match the location of what is happening on screen to the drum or cymbal which matches that approximate location on a real drum kit. Each chapter of the game also features a different style of jazz percussion, with Boch describing the first chapter as the most quintessentially jazz, whereas other chapters feature more unusual instruments for jazz music. The end of the last chapter features the song "You've Got to Have Freedom" by Pharoah Sanders.

== Reception ==
Reception

Aggregate scores
Aggregator	Score
Metacritic	NS: 84/100; PC: 83/100
OpenCritic	89% recommend

Review scores
Publication	Score
Destructoid	9/10
Eurogamer	Recommended
Game Informer	8.25/10
GameSpot	7/10
IGN	8.8/10
Nintendo Life	9/10
Nintendo World Report	8.5/10
PC Gamer (US)	70/100

Ape Out received "generally favorable" reviews on both platforms, according to review aggregator website Metacritic. On OpenCritic, Ape Out received a "strong" approval rating of 89%.

=== Awards ===
The game was a finalist for the 2016 Independent Games Festival's "Best Student Game" award but lost to Beglitched. The game was nominated for "Best Visual Design" and "Best Audio" at the 2019 Golden Joystick Awards, and for the Off Broadway Award for Best Indie Game at the New York Game Awards, and won the award for "Audio Achievement" at the 16th British Academy Games Awards, whereas its other nomination was for "Debut Game".
