= Pullback motor =

Simple clockwork motor used in toy cars

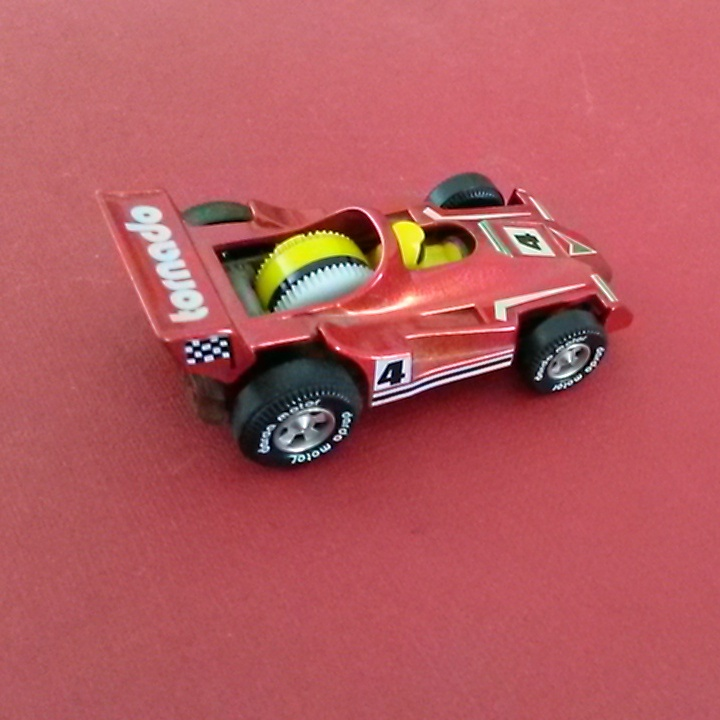
A Darda model car powered by a pullback motor

A pullback motor (also pull back, pull back and go or pull-back) is a simple clockwork motor used in toy cars. A patent for them was granted to Bertrand 'Fred' Francis in 1952 as a keyless clockwork motor.

Pulling the car backward winds up an internal spiral spring; a flat spiral rather than a helical coil spring. When released, the toy car is propelled forward by the spring. When the spring has unwound and the car is moving, the motor is disengaged by a clutch or ratchet and the car then rolls freely onward. Most of these cars are otherwise free-rolling. Winding them up requires them to be pushed downwards, engaging the clutch. As the motor is only engaged for winding while held down, the complete winding must be completed in one pass, unlike flywheel-based systems. Some motors have an internal one-way clutch that allows winding with a back-and-forth motion.

Some pullback motors, usually intended for racing in pairs, have used a catch and release mechanism to retain their springs. These may be wound separately, then launched together by releasing their spring triggers. Darda toys use such a mechanism for their Stop'n'Go motor.

== See also ==
- Friction motor
