= Away: Journey to the Unexpected =

2019 video game

- Developer: Aurélien Regard Games
- Publisher: Dear Villagers
- Platforms: PlayStation 4; Nintendo Switch; Xbox One; Windows; iOS
- Release: February 5, 2019: PS4; WW: February 5, 2019; Switch; WW: February 7, 2019; XONE; WW: February 8, 2019; Win; WW: February 13, 2019; iOS; WW: July 1, 2020
- Genre: Action-adventure
- Mode: Single-player

Away: Journey to the Unexpected is a 2019 action-adventure video game developed by Aurélien Regard Games and published by Dear Villagers.

== Gameplay ==
After his parents disappear and monsters break into his grandparents' house, a teenage boy goes on an adventure to rescue his parents. Away: Journey to the Unexpected is an action adventure game played from a first-person perspective. The levels are procedurally generated, and each one has an item that allows players to recruit any non-player character from that area by successfully navigating a dialogue tree. Choosing the wrong dialogue option makes that character incapable of being recruited. Players can explore dungeons, collect loot, engage in first-person hack and slash combat. Recruited characters can temporarily replace the child in combat and use their attacks. To engage the end boss in battle, players must first recruit all eight of the recruitable characters. Roguelite elements streamline the process somewhat by unlocking the ability to fast travel to specific areas if they die.

== Development ==
Aurélien Regard developed Away: Journey to the Unexpected in France. The soundtrack was made in Japan. Dear Villagers released it for PlayStation 4, Switch, Xbox One, and Windows in early February 2019. It was ported to iOS on July 1, 2020.

== Reception ==
On Metacritic, Away: Journey to the Unexpected received mixed reviews for all platforms except for the PlayStation 4, which received unfavorable reviews. Reviews praised the art style but criticized the dialogue system, combat, and level design. Nintendo World Report praised the unique aspects of the art and gameplay but said the roguelite elements make it feel repetitive.
