= Fabledom =

2024 video game

- Developer: Grenaa Games
- Publishers: Dear Villagers, Doyoyo Games (Note: Physical editions for Nintendo Switch and PlayStation 5 were published by Merge Games.)
- Engine: Unity Engine
- Platforms: Nintendo Switch; PlayStation 5; Windows; Xbox Series X/S
- Release: Windows; 13 May 2024; Nintendo Switch, PlayStation 5, Xbox Series X/S; 12 September 2024
- Genre: City-building
- Mode: Single-player

Fabledom is a 2024 city-building video game developed by Grenaa Games and published by Dear Villagers and Doyoyo Games. It was released in early access for Windows on 13 April 2023. The full version was released on 13 May 2024. Versions were released on 12 September 2024 for Nintendo Switch, PlayStation 5 and Xbox Series X/S.

== Gameplay ==
Fabledom is a city-building game set in a fantasy medieval countryside. The player becomes the founder of a small town, and must put their peasants to work building houses, chopping down trees, farming vegetables and mining stone. The player can also contact and establish diplomacy with other kingdoms which can lead to trade and eventually a prince or princess to share their castle with. Soldiers and archers can be recruited to protect the town.

== Development and release ==
In January 2023, it was announced that the game would release in early access for Windows that spring. Fabledom launched on 13 April 2023 in early access. The full version was released on 13 May 2024. In May 2024, versions for Nintendo Switch, PlayStation 5 and Xbox Series X/S were announced and scheduled to launch in Q3. Fabledom launched on 12 September 2024 for these platforms.

== Reception ==
Reception

Aggregate score
Aggregator	Score
Metacritic	(PC) 77/100

Review scores
Publication	Score
GameStar	79/100
PC Games (DE)	7/10

Fabledom received "generally favourable" reviews from critics, according to review aggregator site Metacritic.

GameStar rated the game 79/100 and described the game as a relaxing "construction game with few weaknesses and a charming scenario." PC Games rated it 7/10 and also described the game as "charming" but stated it would of "benefited from more depth" and it "doesn't fully exploit its fairytale theme."

=== Sales ===
During early access, Fabledom sold over 150,000 copies.
