= Q.U.B.E. =

2011 video game

- Developer: Toxic Games (Note: Nvidia Lightspeed Studios developed the Nvidia Shield version.)
- Publishers: Toxic Games; Headup Games (Germany); Trendy Entertainment (Android); Grip Digital (consoles)
- Engine: Unreal Engine 3
- Platforms: Android; Microsoft Windows; OS X; Linux; PlayStation 3; PlayStation 4; Wii U; Nintendo Switch; Xbox One
- Release: Microsoft Windows: WW: 17 December 2011 (Original); WW: 21 May 2014 (Director's Cut); WW: 14 September 2022 (10th Anniversary); OS X: WW: 17 December 2012 (Original); WW: 3 October 2015 (Director's Cut); Android: WW: 8 July 2015; PlayStation 3, PlayStation 4: NA: 21 July 2015; EU: 22 July 2015; Xbox One: WW: 24 July 2015; Wii U: WW: 27 August 2015; Linux: WW: 3 October 2015; Nintendo Switch: WW: 28 September 2022
- Genre: Puzzle
- Mode: Single-player

Q.U.B.E. (Note: derived from Quick Understanding of Block Extrusion) is a physics-based puzzle video game developed and published by Toxic Games, with help from Indie Fund, a group of independent game developers. The game, an expansion of a student project by the founding members of Toxic Games, was released for Microsoft Windows through a number of digital distribution platforms, first through Desura on 17 December 2011 and then through Steam on 6 January 2012. An OS X port was later released in December 2012 through Steam and Desura.

In the game, the player guides their avatar through a series of levels to make their way to an exit. The player character is equipped with special gloves that can perform a number of functions on specific blocks to reach the exit. The game employs a sterile monochromatic environment that highlights the coloured blocks that the player can interact with, and has been compared to the Portal series.

A sequel, Q.U.B.E. 2, was released for Windows, macOS, PlayStation 4 and Xbox One on 13 March 2018. On 14 September 2022, Q.U.B.E. 10th Anniversary Edition, a full remake of Q.U.B.E. with enhanced visuals, was released.

== Gameplay ==
The player's character, after waking up from some incident, finds himself with a pair of gloves that can interact with specific blocks that are in the walls, floors, and ceilings of the various rooms as he progresses. The function of the blocks are distinguished by colour: red blocks can be extended or retracted; yellow blocks, always in groups of three, can be used to make stair-like structures; blue blocks can be retracted to act like a springboard to whatever touches them; purple blocks provide means to rotate sections of walls of a room; and green blocks provide a sphere or cube, which the player will need to manipulate. In the early stages, the player's goal is to use a combination of these blocks to get themselves to an exit point, allowing them to move to the next chamber.

As the player progresses deeper into the unknown complex, new puzzle aspects are introduced. In one stage, the bulk of the chambers are dark except for specific coloured blocks, requiring the player to remember the location of other blocks as they manipulate them. Another section features light-oriented puzzles, with the player using cubes and other features to orient the light beam in the correct fashion.

=== Story ===
Waking inside a sterile, cube patterned environment, the player finds themselves wearing a special suit with unique gloves, and is contacted over radio by a woman named Commander Nowak. Nowak says that she is an astronaut aboard the International Space Station, and warns that the protagonist may have amnesia as a side effect of the space travel that they have undergone; they are currently aboard a cube-shaped alien vessel on a collision course with Earth. The player is informed they must use their suit to decipher their way through the barren ship in a few hours, which will cause the ship to self-dismantle and collapse before it can destroy the planet. With the player unable to send messages back and the Space Station orbiting behind earth, Nowak encourages the player to push onwards, before routinely losing contact.

Proceeding through the puzzles, between Nowak's contact the player is soon reached by a desperate man warning that the story about Earth and space are all lies, and that the player is actually underground and a lab rat acting in tests. Warning the player that they are being drawn on with false promises, Nowak soon intercepts one of the signals and warns that it is an unauthorized broadcast that the player should ignore; Nowak soon claims the man is a lost astronaut codenamed 919, who was thought to be dead when his shuttle lost contact, whilst 919 insists that Nowak is lying to push the player into completing tests for data.

With the environments collapsing in the final sectors, the player soon reaches a shuttle as the area self-destructs; Nowak demands the player enter as it is an escape pod, whilst 919 is adamant it will plunge the player into a furnace as they are no longer necessary. Climbing inside, the pod launches and the player finds themselves in space, revealing Nowak was telling the truth; having narrowly destroyed the ship between the Earth and its moon, huge rectangular fragments of the ship can be seen drifting off. The game closes as the US President thanks the player for their efforts, and vows to locate 919.

== Development ==
Q.U.B.E. represents the final student project of Daniel Da Rocha, Jonathan Savery and Dave Hall, at Newport University. Upon graduation, the three had received strong feedback for their game, and founded their own company, Toxic Games, to continue its development. During this initial period of development, the team had considered the difficulty of obtaining publishing deals given their inexperience in the field, but instead happened upon funding provided by the Indie Fund, based on the potential of their game, allowing them to work at a more relaxed pace while retaining the intellectual property for themselves. Q.U.B.E. represents the first game funded through the Indie Fund to be released. Aaron Isaksen of the Indie Fund noted that they were drawn to the project while it was still a student project, believing the first-person puzzle game offered new concepts and ideas while providing a clean and simple interface without any time pressure or pin-point accuracy for the player. The Indie Fund provided three separate rounds of funding during the course of Q.U.B.E's development starting in August 2010. This funding, a total of $90,000, was recouped within four days of the game being available on the Steam platform, with over 12,000 copies sold.

None of the Toxic Games team members are programmers: Hall noted that at no time during the development did they have to work directly with programming source code, and Q.U.B.E. demonstrates that it is possible to develop a full game without having to be a programmer. Though Da Rocha, Savery, and Hall remain the core members of the Toxic Games team, they had expanded their team for the release of Q.U.B.E. including the outsourcing of work; for example, they employed James Tan of Teotl Studios, who had worked on The Ball, to help with the menu interface and the details of the player's gloves.

The original student project was completed by the three team members in about six weeks working part-time, while the complete version of the game took over eight months of full-time work by its team. At the time of initial development, they were considering using Unreal Engine 3 for their game engine, but at about the same time, Epic Games announced the freely available Unreal Development Kit, which not only reduced the costs for development but simplified some of the development tasks, such as using the Kismet visual scripting language to provide the game's logic and gameplay.

The team wanted to keep the project relatively simple in both presentation and story to allow the focus to be on the puzzle aspects. The game's world is mostly constructed of cubes and blocks, allowing them to quickly model the world, but giving them enough flexibility to play with those elements in later levels to give the feeling of different environments. Toxic Games wanted to have the player feel immersed in the puzzles, and spent more time emphasising that player's interaction. The game was planned to introduce each puzzle element in isolation to allow the player to learn how to use it without providing any specific instructions, building up to more complex puzzles in later sections of the game. The team originally had a story envisioned for the game, in which the player would hear infrequent narration by a feminine artificial intelligence in the game, voiced by Emily Love, a friend of the team members. The team felt this was necessary because they had been "spoiled" by the use of GLaDOS from the Portal series. Toxic Games decided to drop the incomplete narration and story to assure they could get the game out before the Christmas holiday, having anticipated it would have taken three more months to complete the work. They also expressed concern that players outside England would not understand the accents, something they noticed when they had presented the game at E3 2011. Some elements of this narration remain in the released product, such as a room where the walls attempt to crush the player to create a sense of claustrophobia. Toxic Games stated at the time that they were considering additional downloadable content for the game after completing ports to other platforms, including content that re-adds this story as well as a level editor.

Q.U.B.E. was initially developed for Microsoft Windows, but an OS X version was later released in 2012. The developers considered iOS mobile platform and OnLive versions to develop. A Wii U version was released in August 2015, while a PlayStation Vita port was also considered.

=== Director's cut ===
A "Director's Cut" of Q.U.B.E. was released in May 2014 for Windows and for other platforms later in 2015. The Director's Cut adds story elements to the game, with a script penned by video game writer Rob Yescombe, and with voice acting by Rachel Robinson and Rupert Evans. In addition, the game features ten new levels for speedrun trials, a new musical score, and support for the virtual reality Oculus Rift headset.

== Reception ==
Reception

Aggregate score
Aggregator	Score
Metacritic	PC: 69/100; PS4: 76/100; XONE: 76/100; WIIU: 68/100

Review scores
Publication	Score
Destructoid	7/10
Eurogamer	6/10
GameSpot	6.5/10
GameSpy	2.5/5
IGN	6.5/10

Q.U.B.E. was one of the twelve finalists, but did not win, for the 2011 Indie Game Challenge sponsored by the Academy of Interactive Arts & Sciences.

The game received an aggregated score of 69/100 on Metacritic, indicating mixed or average reviews. Reviewers noted that the game was immediately comparable to the two Portal games, providing puzzles within a sterile environment. The game was praised for building on similar puzzle mechanics while introducing its own ideas. Puzzles involving magnetism, however, were found to be rather tedious compared to the other puzzle elements. The presentation of the new gameplay elements was considered to be well-done, providing a gentle introduction for each before culminating into a larger puzzle. At the same time, reviewers noted that the game lacked any of the personality in story or atmosphere that Portal provided, leaving the player's experience lacking and providing no goal for the player to continue towards beyond seeing what the next puzzle may be. Reviews also noted that the physics of some of the objects like balls and blocks were strange to the point of being manipulated by the game to assure completion of certain puzzles instead of allowing for unlucky bounces that would happen in real life.

== Sequel ==
Toxic Games showed an early demo version of the sequel Q.U.B.E. 2 to the press during the March 2017 Game Developers Conference; Jessica Conditt of Engadget said that "Q.U.B.E. 2 takes the best aspects of the original and throws them all in a beautiful new 3D environment" in an Engadget article. The player takes the role of Amelia Cross, a British archeologist who awakes in an abstract space, and is guided by another entity, Emma, on solving puzzles to help her escape. While the first game required players to use cubes that already existed in the environment, Q.U.B.E. 2 gives players the ability to create cubes of different functions to now control the environment. The game was released for Windows, macOS, PlayStation 4, and Xbox One platforms on March 13, 2018.

Along with a new setting, Q.U.B.E. 2 was developed with a stronger narrative while providing more non-linearity to the game's approach. In addition to Toxic Games' staff, additional material was provided by environmental artist Harry Corr, composer David Housden, and writer and producer Benjamin Hill. The sequel was built using Unreal Engine 4, with minimal coding as the original game; the team expanded to include only one programmer, Jonathan Savery, who developed reusable objects for the game in Unreal's Blueprint system.

== See also ==
- ChromaGun
- Portal
- Portal 2
