= Fract OSC =

2014 video game

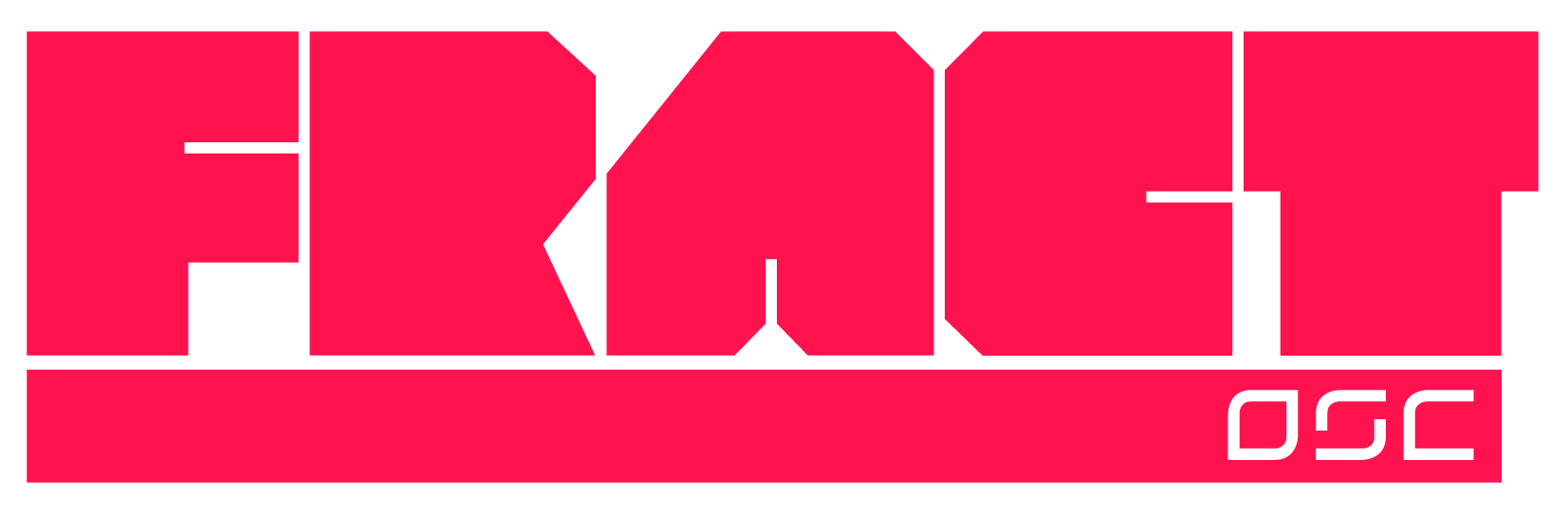
- Logo
- Developer: Phosfiend Systems
- Publisher: Phosfiend Systems
- Engine: Unity
- Platforms: Microsoft Windows, OS X
- Release: WW: April 22, 2014
- Genres: Puzzle, rhythm
- Mode: Single-player

Fract OSC (stylized as FRACT OSC) is a music-based puzzle game created by independent game developer Phosfiend Systems. The game was released on 22 April 2014 for both Microsoft Windows and OS X platforms. Fract OSC allows players to explore an abstract landscape that includes puzzles using platforming and music-based game elements. Completing these puzzles creates ambient music that continues to play in the environment and unlocks portions of an in-game music synthesis that allows players to create their own music.

The game, originally named "Fract," was developed by Richard Flanagan as part of his student work at the University of Montreal and achieved wide interest after winning the Student Showcase award at the 2011 Independent Games Festival and release of a freely available demo. Flanagan brought aboard Quynh Nguyen and Henk Boom to flesh out the game, branding themselves Phosfiend Systems. They received funding help from the Indie Fund to complete the title. The game was originally planned to span several levels, but due to complexity, it was reduced to a single primary level representing a synthetic oscillator, shorted to "OSC" for the game's final release.

== Gameplay ==
A puzzle in Fract OSC, here requiring the player to manipulate large cubes to marked areas using the "engagement mode" interface indicated by the brighter-colored elements

Fract OSC is presented to the player in the first-person view. As a nameless avatar, the player explores the game's world with little guidance besides visual and audio clues. The game begins on an empty space which, as the player discovers while playing the game, is a giant music synthesizer, initially defunct. A portal on this level leads to a game's main world space, the insides of this synthesizer. This world is an abstract landscape, comparable to the visuals of Tron, that includes many large structures along with the unique environmental features. At any time, the player can switch to a special "engagement mode" view that reveals any special virtual controls in the nearby area that can be used to manipulate the game's world. One feature of the world are a number of travel stations, from which the player can rapidly travel to any other previously-opened station. While the player can fall into a lethal liquid at the base of the world, or be crushed by objects in the game world, they are respawned without penalty near a recent checkpoint they passed. The world is divided roughly into three sectors based on colors, red, green, and blue, representing lead, pad, and bass voices, respectively.

In several of the structures are the game's puzzles. The nature of such puzzles are initially abstract but using the engagement mode in proper locations will reveal controls to manipulate these puzzles. There are generally two parts of each puzzle. Within each sector, the first part of these puzzles share a common solution theme, such as manipulating large blocks to specific squares, or routing the flow of sound to a target location. Once this is solved, the player then must set a melody on a smaller synth machine located nearby, as to come up with a rhythm to open up a nearby portal, using visual and audio clues to guess the proper rhythm. Completing both parts of a puzzle unlocks one or more of the larger synthesizer controls in the introductory space, as well as opening up paths in the main world to further explore. Additionally, areas near completed puzzles will emit sound and light effects. Completing all four puzzles within that sector unlocks a larger puzzle for that sector that once solved fully opens up all controls for that synthesizer voice on the main synthesizer. Once all three sectors are completed, the player can complete a final puzzle area that incorporates elements of all previous puzzles to unlock the advanced controls on the main synthesizer and completes the game.

At any time, the player can return to the main synthesizer, and using whatever controls they have unlocked, create musical tracks which they can save and share with other users.

== Development ==
Fract OSC began as a student project by Richard E. Flanagan while at the University of Montreal, working on a post-graduate degree in game design. At the time, Flanagan had named the game Fract, and described it as a "boldly styled Myst-like adventure", having the player explore an abstract world, resembling Tron-like environments, that incorporated music and sound into its aesthetic. These ideas were based on his idea of combines three very personal interests, "early computer culture, adventure games and fundamentals of electronic music", and creating a mechanic that users would experience musical elements early in the game and come to understand how to use these later in the game for larger puzzles. Though not a programmer himself, he learned the Unity engine to build out his ideas, making sure that the engine was capable of capturing the visual feel he wanted for the game while scaling back on some of the larger puzzles he had envisioned. After completing his degree, Flanagan continued to work on the game as to create a single playable level that he submitted for the Independent Games Festival Student Showcase ceremony, while providing this level as a free download for others to test garner interest if he should develop the game further.

Fract was picked as one of the eight Student Showcase winners at the 2011 Independent Games Festival. Between this award and the demo, Flanagan had put aside plans to work at a local game studio and instead work on building out Fract further. At this point, he brought his wife Quynh Nguyen and programmer Henk Boom on board to help improve on his initial programming attempt. The core game was rebuilt mostly from scratch as to take the initial demo into the larger vision Flanagan had. This initially was to be four larger game worlds, but they realized the scope of this would be too large, and instead scaled back to the single game world of the oscillator, which would be shortened as "OSC" within the game's title. Part of the redesign was to create a custom sound engine that would be able to take player's input to synthesis ambient music of the world; they found that in developing this engine, this would influence the puzzle design, including creating puzzles that would directly tie into the audio engine. Complications such as this would slow down their development work. Late development was slowed further by other concerns; Flanagan and Nguyen had a child at this time, while Boom had to find work full-time to cover his expenses. After speaking to the Indie Fund team at the 2012 Game Developers Conference, they were able to secure funding to complete the game the following year, allow them to bring Boom back on full-time.

== Reception ==
Reception

Aggregate score
Aggregator	Score
Metacritic	79/100

Review scores
Publication	Score
Adventure Gamers	4.5/5
Destructoid	8.5/10
Edge	8/10
Eurogamer	8/10
GameRevolution	9/10
GameSpot	6/10
PC Gamer (US)	62/100
Polygon	7/10
Good Game	12/20
