= Mushroom 11 =

2015 video game

- Developer: Untame
- Publisher: Untame
- Producer: Kara Kono
- Designer: Itay Keren
- Programmer: Itay Keren
- Artists: Simon Kono; Julia Keren-Detar
- Writer: Itay Keren
- Composer: The Future Sound of London
- Engine: Unity
- Platforms: Windows; OS X; Linux; iOS; Android
- Release: WW: October 15, 2015
- Genre: Puzzle-platform
- Mode: Single-player

Mushroom 11 is a 2015 puzzle-platform game developed and published by Untame. The game is a 2D side-scroller where players control a green mushroom by deleting parts of cells while it simultaneously regrows. The mushroom can be split and shaped to solve puzzles.

== Development ==
The game was started at the 2012 Global Game Jam event at New York University. Mushroom 11 uses the game engine Unity. It has also been supported by the Indie Fund. The music for the game was licensed from The Future Sound of London.

== Reception ==
Reception

Aggregate score
Aggregator	Score
Metacritic	PC: 78/100 iOS: 80/100

Review scores
Publication	Score
Destructoid	7/10
GameSpot	6/10
IGN	9/10
PC Gamer (US)	85/100
Pocket Gamer	7/10

Mushroom 11 received positive early critical response for the game's unique mechanic and theme. It was a finalist for the IGF 2014 Excellence in Design. IGN awarded it a score of 9.0 out of 10, saying "Mushroom 11 is a strange and unique game that reshapes the way you think about its puzzles."

Mushroom 11 was nominated by IGN for its "Most Innovative" game of 2015 award.
