= Dead in Vinland =

2018 video game

- Humble Store header
- Developer: CCCP
- Publisher: Dear Villagers
- Engine: Unity
- Platforms: Microsoft Windows; macOS; Nintendo Switch
- Release: WW: April 12, 2018; WW: July 11, 2019 (Switch)
- Genre: Survival game
- Mode: Single-player

Dead in Vinland is a survival game developed by CCCP and published in 2018 by Dear Villagers. Players control a Viking family who shipwrecks on an island. A Nintendo Switch version was released in 2019. It was renamed to Dead in Vinland: True Viking Edition.

== Gameplay ==
A Viking family becomes shipwrecked on an island named Vinland, a reference to the historical Vinland settlement in North America. As they attempt to survive in the wilderness, the warlord Bjorn demands they give him tribute. Players control the four Viking family members, each of whom has their own skills, as in role-playing video games. Surviving requires resource management, both to provide for their own needs and collect whatever random tribute Bjorn requires of them. After exploring the island, they can find other shipwrecked survivors and invite them to their camp. Collecting resources can impact their mental and physical health; performing the same task repetitively without break can lead to crippling depression and eventual suicide. If any of the initial Viking family members die, the game ends. Eventually, players can encounter mythological gods, who can provide supplies. The game is turn-based, and each turn is broken into two parts: day and night. Combat is also turn-based and is inspired by JRPGs. The game has an optional "True Viking" mode that enables permadeath.

== Development ==
CCCP is a French video game studio. Dead in Vinland is the sequel to Dead in Bermuda, a similar survival game developed by a smaller team at CCCP. Le Monde estimated that the game cost €500,000, took a team of 10 people almost two years to develop, and required almost another year of support after launch. Dear Villagers, under the name Playdius, released the Windows and macOS versions on April 12, 2018. A beta version for Linux was posted to Steam in December 2018, but it is not officially supported. Three DLCs were released. The Switch version was released on July 11, 2019, and includes all the DLC.

== Reception ==
On Metacritic, the game received mixed reviews on both PC and Switch. Jody Macgregor of PC Gamer wrote, "Dead in Vinland combines resource management, RPG combat, uneven writing, and a lot of diciness into something I couldn't stop playing until I finished it." Nic Reuben similarly criticized the game's writing, but his review for Rock Paper Shotgun called Dead in Vinland "a great example of systemic roguelike storytelling" if players can get past the silly dialogue. PCGamesN's reviewer, Matt Purslow, compared Dead in Vinland to The Banner Saga but said that it allows for more emergent gameplay due to Vinland's focus on management rather than a branching narrative. Cameron Kunzelman of Paste also disliked the game's combat but said that the game is unique for its intertwined systems of random chance and narrative. Reviewing the Switch version for Nintendo Life, Dom Reseigh-Lincoln criticized the game's reliance on random dice rolls and its combat system, but he enjoyed seeing a struggling settlement eventually flourish.
