= Burly Men at Sea =

2016 video game

- Developers: Brain&Brain
- Publishers: Brain&Brain, Plug In Digital
- Platforms: Microsoft Windows, macOS, iOS, Android, PlayStation 4, PlayStation Vita, Nintendo Switch
- Release: Steam, iOS, Android; September 29, 2016; Nintendo Switch; April 12, 2018
- Genre: Indie game
- Mode: Single-player

Burly Men at Sea is a 2016 indie video game released for Steam, iOS, Android, PlayStation 4, PlayStation Vita and Nintendo Switch designed by Brooke Condolora and developed by Arkansas-based studio Brain&Brain, published by Brain&Brain and Plug In Digital.

== Plot ==
Burly Men at Sea's round, bearded heroes are guided by the player into treacherous waters where creatures drawn from Scandinavian folklore are hiding in the depths. Gamers play as storyteller and wayfinder, with the plot beginning at the same point at which it ends.

== Reception ==
Olivia White from The Daily Telegraph termed the game, "the closest thing I've played to an interactive fairy-tale", while The Harvard Crimson called it a "charming journey", lauding its minimalistic art style and playful music. "What makes Burly Men at Sea different from the heaps of illustrated books my dad read to me as a kid is that you get to control the path the story takes", noted Kill Screen. Katharine Castle from Rock Paper Shotgun praised the game's story-telling, humor, charm, and soundtrack. Time magazine's Matt Peckham enjoyed its plot, animations, and sound effects. Riley MacLeod of Kotaku considered the surprising outcomes by taking different paths "a large part of the game's appeal" while praising its "basic but creative soundtrack".
