= A Normal Lost Phone =

2017 video game

- Developer: Accidental Queens
- Publishers: Playdius; Plug In Digital
- Engine: Unity
- Platforms: Microsoft Windows, macOS, Linux, Android, iOS, Nintendo Switch
- Release: Windows, macOS, Linux, Android, iOS; WW: January 26, 2017; Switch; WW: March 1, 2018
- Genre: Puzzle
- Mode: Single-player

A Normal Lost Phone is a 2017 puzzle video game developed by Accidental Queens and published by Playdius and Plug In Digital, released on Microsoft Windows, macOS, Linux, Android, iOS, and Nintendo Switch. The game was programmed by Diane Landais. In September 2017, a spiritual sequel to the game was released, entitled Another Lost Phone: Laura's Story. The games explore themes of LGBT identity and domestic abuse by asking the player to investigate the phone of a stranger.

== Development ==
Originally developed during a game jam, the team would retrospectively identify design mistakes that were rectified in the sequel.

== Gameplay ==
Both games are played entirely as a simulation of a cell phone. In each game, the player is tasked with voyeuristically searching through a lost cell phone, in order to discover what happened to its owner. Each game features puzzles where the player will have to use clues inferred from one part of the phone to unlock another, such as figuring out a character's birth year which is used as a password for one app by inferring this information from another part of the app.

== Plot ==
=== A Normal Lost Phone ===
The player investigates the phone of a person named Sam living in the fictional city of Melren, thereby discovering bits about their life.

As the game progresses the player discovers several major secrets and events, such as the attempted rape of a friend by another of Sam's acquaintances. The player also learns that Sam is a bisexual transgender woman named Samira and has been hiding this from multiple people in her life, to whom she presented as a straight male. The player will eventually discover Sam's dating profiles, one where she presents as male and another as female, and a forum for transgender persons, where Sam comes to terms with her true gender. She eventually decides to come out to an acquaintance of hers named Lola, only to be met with hostility, which greatly depresses her. To make matters worse, she discovers that her parents and girlfriend Melissa are very bigoted towards the LGBT community, leading to Sam breaking up with Melissa.

Sam eventually gains enough courage to come out to her friend Alice, who accepts her warmly. She's heartbroken when she realizes that Alice will be leaving town to attend college in another area, which will rob her of what Sam sees as the only positive person in her life, especially as she learns that her family has a history of disowning gay relatives. Ultimately, Sam chooses to leave home to reinvent herself in another town after her father gifts her a motorbike for her 18th birthday, and throws away her phone, aware that someone may find it and sift through her information. The only person she tells is Alice, who congratulates Sam on taking charge of her own life and comforts her by saying that anyone who finds her phone will likely erase the phone's data, especially if they have read all of the information and realized that this is what Sam would want. The game ends when the player erases the phone's data per Alice's message.

=== Another Lost Phone: Laura's Story ===
This game tasks the player with investigating the discarded cell phone of a woman named Laura. A preliminary investigation of the phone presents Laura's life as idyllic; she is head-over-heels in love with her boyfriend, Ben.

The player eventually learns that Laura has suffered a stressful ordeal at work; an unknown person created a fake email account in her name, and forwarded a private, erotic video of her to all of her work contacts, which not only compromised her employment but also her company's relationship with other organizations. The event opened up Laura to sexual harassment and culminated in her having to work from home. Laura initially suspected her ex-boyfriend Alex, the one she originally sent the video to years ago, to have sent the video out as an act of jealousy; but Alex convinces her of his innocence. Laura is contacted by a woman named Claire (who initially uses the pseudonym of Amanda), who warns Laura that Ben is manipulative and was responsible for this event; however, as Ben had previously warned Laura of Claire (saying that she was jealous of him in the past and tried to sabotage his past relationships), Laura doesn't believe her. Laura also begins experiencing symptoms that suggest she is pregnant, and she feels she isn't ready to have a child with him.

It eventually becomes clear that Laura is actually in an abusive relationship with Ben; at the suggestion of her colleague and friend Charlotte, Laura attends a domestic violence seminar and learns about the cycle of abuse, and notes the similarities between the cycle and her relationship with Ben. Slowly, Charlotte is able to wake Laura up to the realization that Ben is manipulating her. Claire, now believed by Laura, reveals that Ben was once physically violent to a previous girlfriend of his, and wanting to avoid a repeat situation is what drove Claire to contact Laura. Laura is able to secure a different job for her company in a different city, so she discards her phone, and requests to the phone's founder (the player) that they enable the GPS service to lead Ben down a false trail (to stop him from harassing Laura's friends and family about her disappearance), and then erase the phone's data. The game ends when the player does so, and the ending reveals that Laura was never pregnant and is enjoying her new life away from her abusive ex-partner.

== Reception and accolades ==
Reception

Aggregate score
Aggregator	Score
Metacritic	iOS: 83/100; PC: 71/100; NS: 73/100

Review scores
Publication	Score
Nintendo Life	4/10
Nintendo World Report	7/10
PC Gamer (US)	68/100
Pocket Gamer	4/5

On Metacritic, the game has a score of 83/100 on iOS, 71/100 on PC, and 73/100 on Switch.

It was nominated for "Best Mobile Game" and "Best Screenplay", and won the "Special Jury Prize" with Another Lost Phone: Laura's Story at the 2017 Ping Awards; it was also nominated for the A-Train Award for Best Mobile Game at the New York Game Awards 2018; and for "Best Emotional Mobile and Handheld Game" and "Best Emotional Indie Game" at the Emotional Games Awards 2018.
