= SanctuaryRPG =

2014 video game

- Developer: Black Shell Games
- Publisher: Black Shell Media
- Director: Daniel Doan
- Producers: Raghav Mathur, Markus "Notch" Persson, Brandon Wulff, Michael Serajnik, Rafal Kokosza
- Programmer: Daniel Doan
- Artist: Angel Rodriguez
- Writers: Dorian Karahalios, Yixin Li
- Composer: Rafael Langoni Smith
- Engine: C++
- Platform: Microsoft Windows
- Release: WW: April 29, 2014; Black Edition: WW: February 13, 2015
- Genres: RPG, roguelike, strategy, adventure, Turn-based tactics
- Mode: Single-player

SanctuaryRPG is an adventure game developed by Black Shell Games and released on April 29, 2014 for Microsoft Windows.

== Gameplay ==
SanctuaryRPG is a turn-based role-playing game, notable for its extensive use of ASCII art. The plot concerns the search for an entity called The Matron within a location known as Westhaven, which contains elements from both fantasy and science-fiction settings. Notably, enemy encounters will include creatures such as slimes, skeletons, and robots.

Players control an adventurer of a chosen class and background, and fight with a combo-based combat system. The game utilizes permadeath in its default mode, meaning that if the player is defeated then they must start over from the beginning.

Game locations are chosen via the context menu to explore the world. Areas include combat zones and towns, which contain NPCs, shops, and crafting workshops

== Reception ==
Sanctuary RPG has received generally positive reviews. Patrick Hancock of Destructoid praised the game's art and UI, in addition to its modern feeling combat.
