= Plug In Digital =

French video game publisher

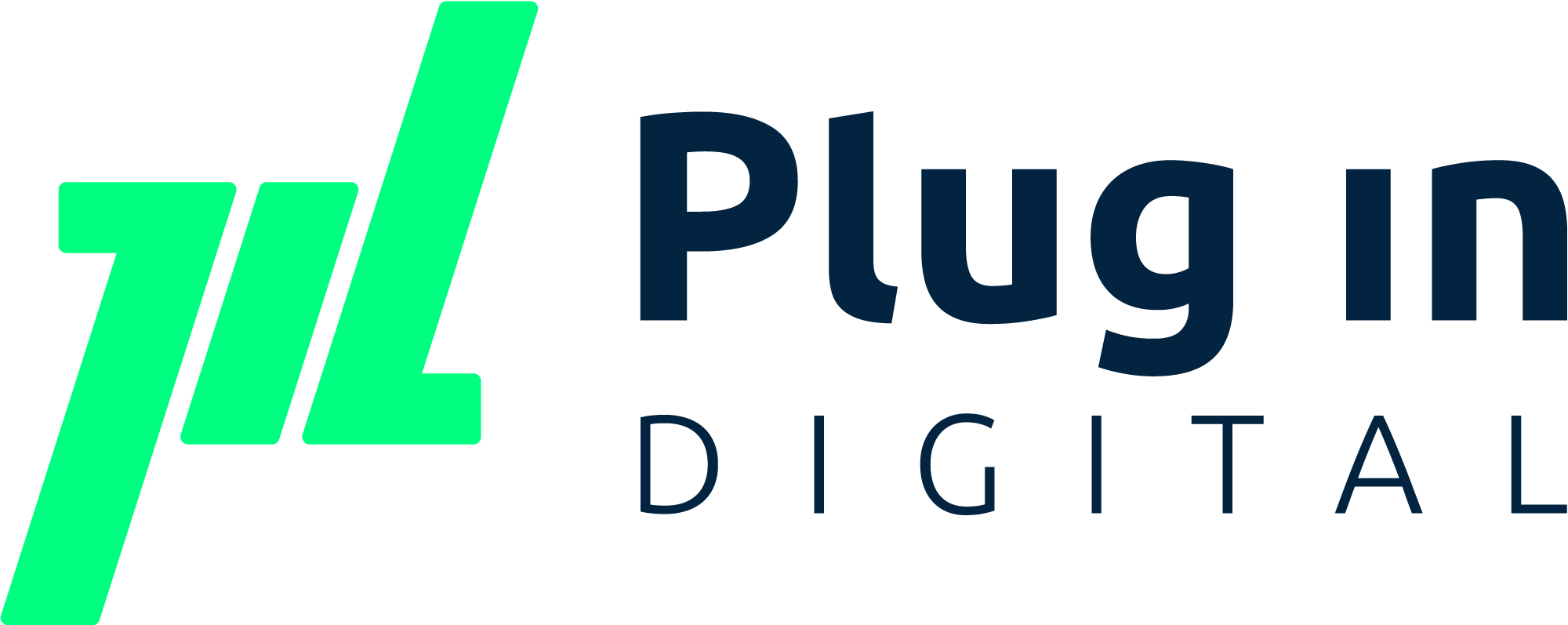
- Type: Private
- Industry: Video games
- Founded: January 18, 2012; 14 years ago
- Founder: Francis Ingrand
- Headquarters: France; Paris (2012-2019); Montpellier (2019-Present)
- Services: Video game publishing; Video game distribution
- Subsidiaries: Dear Villagers; Celsius Online; PixelRatio
- Website: plugindigital.com dearvillagers.com

Plug In Digital is a French video game publisher and distributor. They were founded in 2012 and publish mid-market games for personal computers and consoles under the label Dear Villagers (formerly Playdius), such as The Forgotten City and Caravan SandWitch. Plug In Digital also owns two development studios: Celsius Online (since 2023) and PixelRatio (since 2025).

== History ==
Francis Ingrand founded Plug In Digital in 2012 in Paris. Seven years later, they relocated to Montpellier. They initially focused on assisting studios and video game publishers with digital distribution. They handle sales, marketing, and other distribution issues. They expanded into China in 2019. They acquired Black Shell Media's publishing operations in 2021 and took over their contracts. They announced an NFT program in 2022 but canceled it due to a backlash. In 2023, they acquired game development studio Celsius Online. In 2025, they acquired PixelRatio, a development studio based in Spain.

== Subsidiaries ==
In 2017, Plug In Digital established Playdius, a subsidiary specializing in publishing independent video games for personal computers, mobile devices, and game consoles. Playdius was renamed to Dear Villagers in 2019, citing a desire to better communicate their focus on the core and hardcore demographics. As part of this rebranding, Dear Villagers refocused on PC and consoles, though they said they may publish mobile ports of existing games. New mobile games are published directly by Plug In Digital instead, coinciding with the opening of an office in Shanghai. Games published by Dear Villagers aim for an AA (mid-market) budget. Hardcore Gamer described games published by Dear Villagers as having gameplay that is easy to learn but hard to master.

PID Games was established in 2020 and was sunsetted in 2025. According to the brand manager, they had "no rules" and focused entirely on publishing any interesting video games, regardless of genre, nationality, or platform. Compared to Dear Villagers, they were open to publishing a new developer's first game or inexpensive mobile games. The label was shut down in 2025 to give more focus to Dear Villagers, but new projects corresponding to PID Games' formula can still be published under Plug In Digital's umbrella.

== Awards ==
Some games published by the company were nominated at industry events, such as The Forgotten City, which was a candidate for Game of the Year and Best Debut Game at the 2022 BAFTA. Caravan SandWitch was awarded two Pégases, one for Best First Game and the other for Best Indie Game.

== Games published ==
=== Dear Villagers ===
- 1348 Ex Voto
- A Normal Lost Phone
- Astria Ascending
- Ashwalkers: A Survival Journey
- Away: Journey to the Unexpected
- BAFL: Brakes Are For Losers
- Big Helmet Heroes
- Boiling Bolt
- Born of Bread
- Bury Me, My Love
- Caravan SandWitch
- Chroniric XIX
- Dead in Vinland
- The Dungeon of Naheulbeuk: The Amulet of Chaos
- Edge of Eternity
- EverSiege: Untold Ages
- Fabledom
- The Forgotten City
- Fort Solis
- Guayota
- Hellslave II: Judgement of the Archon
- Hover
- Impulsion
- Jengo
- Machinika: Atlas
- Mindcop
- Naheulbeuk's Dungeon Master
- Neurovoider
- Old School Musical
- Pankapu
- Recompile
- Revita
- Souldiers
- Spirit Mancer
- Spitkiss
- ScourgeBringer
- Splasher
- Sports: Renovations
- Star Overdrive
- Stay
- Strikers Edge
- sU and The Quest for Meaning
- Terra Memoria
- The Land Beneath Us
- Passing By - A Tailwind Journey
- Vampire: The Masquerade – Reckoning of New York
- Caravan SandWitch
- Star Overdrive

=== Plug In Digital ===
- Dungeon Souls
- The Fan
- Overture
- Raining Blobs
- SanctuaryRPG
- John Mambo
- Mad Tracks (Note: Plug In Digital published a Steam version in March 10, 2020)
- Serial Cleaner
- Somewhere: The Vault Papers

=== PID Games (2020-2025) ===
- Abandon Ship
- Alba: A Wildlife Adventure
- An Ankou
- Alt-Frequencies (Switch)
- Bibots
- Blon
- Cassiodora
- Crypto Against All Odds
- Elypse
- Epistory: Typing Chronicles
- Fireball Wizard
- Ghost of a Tale (PS4 and Switch)
- Gravity Circuit
- Guardians of Elderon
- Guild of Ascension
- Healer's Quest
- Heck Deck
- Hellslave
- Iris and the Giant (Switch)
- Lempo
- Let Me Out
- Letters: A Written Adventure
- Lords of Exile
- Lost Eidolons (PS5, Xbox Series X/S)
- Lost Words: Beyond the Page (iOS, And)
- Machinika Museum
- Mari and Bayu - The Road Home
- My Museum: Treasure Hunter
- Out of Space (PS4, Xbox One, Switch)
- Paper Beast (Windows)
- PictoQuest (Switch, Win, iOS, Android)
- Pompom: The Great Space Rescue
- Post Human W.A.R.
- Roto Force
- Run: The World In-Between
- Saviorless
- Shape of the World
- Sigma Theory (iOS, And, Switch)
- Simulakros
- Skábma: Snowfall
- Tacape
- Turnip Boy Commits Tax Evasion
- Unmemory
- Vernal Edge
- Yono and the Celestial Elephants
