= Darda (toy) =

German toy car racing set

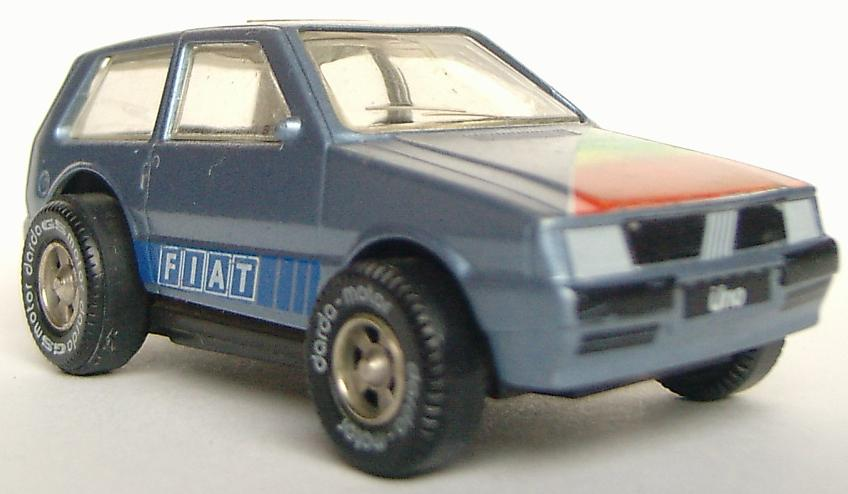
A Darda Fiat Uno

Darda is the name of a German toy car racing set (and related items) which was most popular in Europe and the USA throughout the 1980s and '90s.

The unique selling point of the sets is the special Darda Motor, invented by Helmut Darda in 1970, which propelled the cars (similarly sized to Matchbox or Hot Wheels) at speeds of up to 30 mph (50 km/h). The pullback motor is wound up by pressing down the rear of the car and rolling it forwards and backwards on its wheels. Whilst winding the car up the motor clicks and once fully wound the tone of clicks deepens to signify that it can be wound no more.

The cars can be run on any surface but are designed to be run on special Darda tracks which can be bought as sets or individual track pieces. The tracks incorporate loops, jumps, curves and crossovers, and can be combined into quite elaborate creations including multi-level loops and Y-shaped return curves.

As with Hot Wheels and Matchbox, a range of cars is available. As Darda was originally a German company, many of the cars were based on German brands such as VW and Porsche. Various special cars were also created including a dragster and a mouse (which could not run on the Darda tracks as it was too wide). Another variant available in the late '80s was a replica KITT (Knight Industries Two Thousand) from the US television series Knight Rider. Recent models have included custom NASCAR racers, patrol cars from a variety of police forces including the New York Police Department, and a series of mounted collectible cars.

In the late 1980s, a new version of the Darda motor was introduced, called the Darda-Stop motor (later renamed to the Darda Stop-n-Go motor), it allowed the motor to be locked once wound so that the car could be placed on the track without immediately setting off. This allowed for longer tracks and 'tag-team' relay style racing where once the first car had gone round the track and just run out of power, it would tap the back of the wound up one and set it going. Ultraspeed cars, with lightweight plastic bodies rather than die-cast ones, were also introduced.

Darda products were packaged in a distinctive yellow and green packaging; today the color scheme has shifted to grays, blacks and blues.
