= UK Games Fund =

UK government-funded support programme

The UK Games Fund is a government-funded support programme for the UK's independent games development sector. Grants from the fund provide production finance by way of a contribution towards the employee and contractor costs for prototype game development. The UK Government Department that provides the UK Games Fund funding is the Department for Culture Media and Sport.

== History ==
The UK Games Fund was established in 2015 as a result of funding announced in the March 2015 Budget. The UK Games Fund is run by UK Games Talent and Finance Community Interest Company. The fund was developed after piloting a predecessor Prototype Fund which ran from 2008-2014 at Abertay University. UK Games Talent and Finance CIC was established in 2015 as a non-profit Community Interest Company to support the UK's early stage independent games development sector and the people that work within it. The fund includes a graduate talent pathway called Tranzfuser, supporting teams of graduate students from UK universities. In 2017 after two years of operation Sir Peter Bazalgette's Independent Review of the Creative Industries recommended a £23.7 million investment in the UK Games Fund and Tranzfuser over five years.

== Rationale ==
The UK Games Fund was set up to promote a vibrant business environment for games development, addressing problems in attracting micro business and SME early-stage financing (deterred for example by asymmetrical information).

== Funding ==
In 2015 the UK Government provided £4m to launch a games prototype fund called the UK Games Fund and a graduate enterprise programme called Tranzfuser. Further funding of £1.5m for the UK Games Fund and Tranzfuser was announced by the UK Government in 2018. Further funding of £8.355m for the UK Games Fund and Tranzfuser was awarded by the UK Government in 2022. As at 1 April 2023 the total funding committed by the UK Government to the UK Games Fund, Tranzfuser, DunDev and associated programme activities since 2015 is £16.62m and this covers a period that ends on 31 March 2025. On 14 June 2023 the UK Government's Creative Sector Vision announced a further £5 million pounds for the UK Games Fund.

== Tranzfuser ==
The Tranzfuser programme of the UK Games Fund works with over twenty UK universities to identify graduate talent with the potential to start games studios. Teams work competitively on a summer project and showcase the outcome at a consumer show. During the COVID-19 pandemic the showcasing was undertaken virtually and extended to support graduates seeking careers rather than business start up. It has since reverted to the original enterprise format. In 2023 a residential games development opportunity called DunDev began supporting companies formed from previous Tranzfuser teams. In DunDev, four companies stay and work in the city of Dundee each January to develop their games and accelerate their business.

== Community contribution ==
Grants are non-repayable but trigger a commitment for recipients to give back time contributions towards the business and creative support of their peers in the independent games development community. This was described by Sir Peter Bazalgette as a ‘deal’ between government and industry with the former providing investment and the latter maximising the economic returns through taking on and scaling up the prototype games and fostering the pipeline of talent that Tranzfuser delivers.
