= List of video games released in 2018 =

The following is a comprehensive index of all games released in 2018, sorted chronologically by release date, and divided by quarter. Information regarding developer, publisher, operating system, genre, and type of release is provided where available

For a summary of 2018 in video games as a whole, see 2018 in video games.

== Legend ==
Video game platforms
3DS	Nintendo 3DS, 3DS Virtual Console, iQue 3DS	DROID	Android	GEN	Genesis / Mega Drive
iOS	iOS, iPhone, iPod, iPadOS, iPad, visionOS, Apple Vision Pro	LIN	Linux, SteamOS	NS	Nintendo Switch
OSX	macOS	PS3	PlayStation 3	PS4	PlayStation 4
PSV	PlayStation Vita	PSVR	Playstation VR, PlayStation VR2	Quest	Meta Quest / Oculus Quest family, including Oculus Rift
SNES	Super NES / Super Famicom / Super Comboy	Wii	Wii, WiiWare, Wii Virtual Console	WiiU	Wii U, WiiU Virtual Console
WIN	Windows, all versions Windows 95 and up	XB360	Xbox 360, Xbox 360 Live Arcade	XBO	Xbox One

Types of releases
Compilation	A compilation, anthology or collection of several titles, usually (but not always) belonging to the same series
Early access	A game launched in early access is unfinished and thus might contain bugs and glitches or have some of the content missing
Episodic	An episodic video game that is released in batches over a period of time
Expansion	A large-scale DLC to an already existing game that adds new story, areas and additions and/or changes to the game's mechanics
Full release	A full release of a game that launched in early access first
Limited	A special release (often called "Limited" or "Collector's Edition") with bonus collector's material. Often provided to people who pre-order a game
Port	The game first appeared on a different platform and a port was made. The game is like the original, with few or no differences
Remake	The game is an enhanced remake of an original, made using a new engine and/or assets and thus containing completely new sound, graphics and possibly changes to the story and/or gameplay
Remaster	The game is a remaster of an original, released on the same or different platform, with (usually minor) changes to graphics, sound and/or gameplay
Rerelease	The game was re-released on the same platform with no or only minor changes

Video game genres
Action	Action game	Action RPG	Action role-playing game	Action-adventure	Action-adventure game
Adventure	Adventure game	Battle royale	Battle royale game	Brawler	Beat 'em up
City builder	City-building game	CMS	Construction and management simulation	DCCG	Digital collectible card game
Dungeon crawl	Dungeon crawl	Fighting	Fighting game	FPS	First-person shooter
Graphic adventure	Graphic adventure	Hack and slash	Hack and slash	Horror	Horror game
Metroidvania	Metroidvania	MMO	Massively multiplayer online game	MOBA	Multiplayer online battle arena
Music	Music video game	Party	Party video game	PCA	Point-and-click adventure
Platformer	Platformer	Puzzle	Puzzle video game	Puzzle-platformer	Puzzle-platformer
Racing	Racing video game	Rhythm	Rhythm game	Roguelike	Roguelike, Roguelite
RPG	Role-playing video game	RTS	Real-time strategy	RTT	Real-time tactics
Sandbox	Sandbox game	Shoot 'em up	Shoot 'em up	Shooter	Shooter game
Simulation	Simulation video game	Sports	Sports video game	Stealth	Stealth game
Strategy	Strategy video game	Survival	Survival game	Survival horror	Survival horror
Tactical RPG	Tactical role-playing game	Tactical shooter	Tactical shooter	TBS	Turn-based strategy
TBT	Turn-based tactics	TPS	Third-person shooter	Vehicle sim	Vehicle simulation game
Vehicular combat	Vehicular combat game	Visual novel	Visual novel	Walking sim	Walking simulator

== List ==
=== January–March ===
Release date	Title	Platform	Type	Genre	Developer	Publisher	Ref.
January 9	Little Red Lie	PS4, PSV		Adventure			
January 11	The Escapists 2	NS		Strategy, RPG		Team17	
January 16	InnerSpace	WIN, OSX, NS, PS4, XBO		Adventure		Aspyr	
January 16	Kerbal Space Program: Enhanced Edition	PS4, XBO		Vehicle sim (spaceship)		Private Division	
January 16	Street Fighter V Arcade Edition	WIN, PS4		Fighting		Capcom	
January 18	Darkest Dungeon	NS		RPG, Dungeon crawl		Red Hook Studios	
January 18	Genital Jousting	WIN		Party		Devolver Digital	
January 18	Gintama Rumble	PS4		Hack and slash		Bandai Namco Entertainment	
January 18	Spirit Hunter: Death Mark (JP)	PS4		Adventure, Visual novel		Experience Inc.	
January 18	World to the West	NS		Adventure		Rain Games	
January 19	Digimon Story: Cyber Sleuth – Hacker's Memory	PS4, PSV		RPG		Bandai Namco Entertainment	
January 19	Kirby Battle Royale	3DS		Brawler		Nintendo	
January 23	Iconoclasts	WIN, OSX, LIN, PS4, PSV		Action, Platformer		Bifrost Entertainment	
January 23	The Inpatient	PS4		Survival horror		Sony Interactive Entertainment	
January 23	Lost Sphear	WIN, NS, PS4		RPG		Square Enix	
January 23	Subnautica	WIN, OSX		Adventure, Survival		Unknown Worlds Entertainment	
January 25	Celeste	WIN, OSX, LIN, NS, PS4, XBO		Platformer		Maddy Makes Games	
January 25	Hello Lady! Superior Dynamis (JP)	PSV		Visual novel		Dramatic Create	
January 26	Dragon Ball FighterZ	WIN, PS4, XBO		Fighting		Bandai Namco Entertainment	
January 26	Monster Hunter: World	PS4, XBO		Action RPG		Capcom	
January 26	Railway Empire	WIN, PS4, XBO		Simulation		Kalypso Media	
January 30	Dissidia Final Fantasy NT	PS4		Action RPG, Fighting		Square Enix	
February 1	Night in the Woods	NS		Adventure		Finji	
February 1	Sky Force Reloaded	NS		Shoot 'em up		Infinite Dreams Inc.	
February 1	SteamWorld Dig	NS		Platformer, Action-adventure, Metroidvania		Thunderful Publishing	
February 2	EA Sports UFC 3	PS4, XBO		Fighting, Sports		EA Sports	
February 2	Gundemoniums (JP)	PS4, PSV		Bullet hell		Mediascape	
February 2	We Were Here Too	WIN		Adventure		Total Mayhem Games	
February 6	Marooners	PS4, XBO				M2H	
February 6	Shadow of the Colossus	PS4		Action-adventure		Sony Interactive Entertainment	
February 8	Aegis Defenders	WIN, OSX, NS, PS4		Platformer, Tower defense		Humble Bundle	
February 8	Attack of the Earthlings	WIN		TBT		Team Junkfish	
February 8	Civilization VI: Rise and Fall	WIN		TBS, 4X		2K Games	
February 8	Final Fantasy XV: Pocket Edition	DROID		Action RPG		Square Enix	
February 8	Octogeddon	WIN				All Yes Good	
February 8	Rust	WIN, OSX, LIN		Action-adventure, Survival		Facepunch Studios	
February 9	Dragon Quest Builders	NS		Action RPG, Sandbox		Nintendo	
February 9	The Seven Deadly Sins: Knights of Britannia	PS4				Bandai Namco Entertainment	
February 9	Tusks: The Orc Dating Sim	WIN		Dating simulator, Visual novel	Mitch Alexander		
February 9	Under Night In-Birth Exe: Late[st]	PS3, PS4, PSV		Fighting, Visual novel		Aksys Games	
February 13	Dead Maze	WIN, OSX, LIN		MMO, Survival		Atelier 801	
February 13	Dynasty Warriors 9	WIN, PS4, XBO		Hack and slash		Koei Tecmo	
February 13	Kingdom Come: Deliverance	WIN, PS4, XBO		Action RPG		Deep Silver	
February 13	The Longest 5 Minutes	WIN, NS, PSV		RPG		NIS America	
February 13	Monster Energy Supercross: The Official Videogame	WIN, NS, PS4, XBO		Racing		Milestone srl	
February 13	Owlboy	NS		Platformer, Adventure		D-Pad Studio	
February 13	Radiant Historia: Perfect Chronology	3DS		RPG		Atlus	
February 14	The Legend of Heroes: Trails of Cold Steel II	WIN		RPG		Xseed Games	
February 15	A Certain Magical Virtual-On	PS4, PSV		Fighting		Sega	
February 15	Secret of Mana	WIN, PS4, PSV		Action RPG		Square Enix	
February 16	Bayonetta	NS		Action, Hack and slash		Nintendo	
February 16	Bayonetta 2	NS		Action, Hack and slash		Nintendo	
February 16	Fe	WIN, NS, PS4, XBO		Action-adventure		Electronic Arts	
February 20	Age of Empires: Definitive Edition	WIN		RTS		Microsoft Studios	
February 20	Armored Warfare	PS4		Tactical shooter		My.com	
February 20	Legendary Gary	WIN		Adventure			
February 20	Metal Gear Survive	WIN, PS4, XBO		Survival, Action-adventure		Konami	
February 21	Layers of Fear: Legacy	NS		Horror (psych)		Aspyr	
February 22	Fist of the North Star: Lost Paradise (JP)	PS4		Action-adventure		Sega	
February 22	Kimi no Hitomi ni Hit Me (JP)	PS4, PSV		Visual novel		Entergram	
February 22	Pac-Man Championship Edition 2 Plus	NS		Maze		Bandai Namco Entertainment	
February 23	Past Cure	WIN, PS4, XBO		Action		Phantom 8 Studio	
February 23	Sword Art Online: Fatal Bullet	WIN, PS4, XBO				Bandai Namco Entertainment	
February 23	Yume Nikki: Dream Diary	WIN		Adventure		Playism	
February 26	Part Time UFO	iOS, DROID		Puzzle		HAL Laboratory	
February 27	De Blob 2	PS4, XBO		Platformer, Puzzle		THQ Nordic	
February 27	Girls und Panzer: Dream Tank Match	PS4		Action		Bandai Namco Entertainment	
February 27	Gravel	WIN, PS4, XBO		Racing		Milestone srl	
February 27	Heroine Anthem Zero—Episode 1	PS4		Action RPG		WindThunder Studio	
February 27	Into the Breach	WIN		TBS		Subset Games	
February 27	Moss	PS4		Adventure, Puzzle		Polyarc	
February 27	Outlast	NS		Survival horror		Red Barrels	
February 27	Payday 2	NS		FPS, Stealth		505 Games	
February 28	Black Desert Mobile	iOS, DROID		MMORPG	Pearl Abyss	Pearl Abyss	
February 28	Darkest Dungeon	XBO		RPG, Dungeon crawl		Red Hook Studios	
February 28	H1Z1	WIN		Battle royale		Daybreak Game Company	
March 2	Pit People	WIN, XBO		Action RPG, Strategy		The Behemoth	
March 6	Bravo Team	PS4		Action, FPS		Supermassive Games	
March 6	DJMax Respect	PS4		Rhythm		Neowiz Games	
March 6	Fear Effect Sedna	WIN, NS, PS4, XBO		RPG, TPS		Forever Entertainment	
March 6	Final Fantasy XV: Windows Edition	WIN		Action RPG		Square Enix	
March 6	Frantics	PS4		Party		NapNok Games	
March 6	Scribblenauts Showdown	NS, PS4, XBO		Party		Warner Bros. Interactive Entertainment	
March 6	Way of the Passive Fist	WIN, PS4, XBO		Action, Fighting		Household Games	
March 7	Chuchel	WIN, iOS, DROID		Graphic adventure		Amanita Design	
March 7	Damascus Gear: Operation Osaka	WIN, PS4, PSV		Action RPG, Shooter		Arc System Works	
March 7	Northgard	WIN		Strategy, City builder		Shiro Games	
March 8	Warhammer: Vermintide 2	WIN		Action		Fatshark	
March 8	Your Four Knight Princesses Training Story (JP)	NS, PS4, PSV		RPG		Nippon Ichi Software	
March 9	Flinthook	NS		Platformer, Roguelike		Tribute Games	
March 13	Devil May Cry HD Collection	WIN, PS4, XBO		Hack and slash		Capcom	
March 13	Ghost of a Tale	WIN		Action-adventure, Stealth		SeithCG	
March 13	Q.U.B.E. 2	WIN, OSX, PS4, XBO		Puzzle		Trapped Nerve Games	
March 15	Clustertruck	NS		Platformer		tinyBuild	
March 15	Gal Gunvolt Burst	PS4		Platformer		Inti Creates	
March 15	Shin Hayarigami	iOS, DROID		Visual novel		Nippon Ichi Software	
March 15	Surviving Mars	WIN, PS4, XBO		Simulation, Strategy		Paradox Interactive	
March 16	Burnout Paradise Remastered	PS4, XBO		Racing		Electronic Arts	
March 16	Kirby Star Allies	NS		Platformer		Nintendo	
March 20	Assassin's Creed Rogue: Remastered	PS4, XBO		Action-adventure, Stealth		Ubisoft	
March 20	Assault Gunners HD Edition	WIN, PS4		Action		Marvelous	
March 20	Attack on Titan 2	WIN, NS, PS4, XBO		Action, Hack and slash		Koei Tecmo	
March 20	R.B.I. Baseball 18	PS4, XBO		Sports		MLB Advanced Media	
March 20	Sea of Thieves	WIN, XBO		Action-adventure		Microsoft Studios	
March 20	Shantae and the Pirate's Curse	NS		Platformer		WayForward	
March 21	Valkyria Chronicles 4 (JP)	PS4		Tactical RPG		Sega	
March 22	Shadowgun Legends	DROID, iOS		FPS		Madfinger Games	
March 23	Detective Pikachu	3DS		Adventure		Nintendo	
March 23	Ni no Kuni II: Revenant Kingdom	WIN, PS4		RPG		Bandai Namco Entertainment	
March 23	A Way Out	WIN, PS4, XBO		Action-adventure		Electronic Arts	
March 27	The Alliance Alive	3DS		RPG		Atlus	
March 27	Atelier Lydie & Suelle: The Alchemists and the Mysterious Paintings	WIN, NS, PS4		RPG		Koei Tecmo	
March 27	Far Cry 5	WIN, PS4, XBO		Action-adventure, FPS		Ubisoft	
March 27	MLB The Show 18	PS4		Sports		Sony Interactive Entertainment	
March 27	MX vs. ATV All Out	WIN, PS4, XBO		Racing		THQ Nordic	
March 27	Outlast 2	NS		Survival horror		Red Barrels	
March 27	The Witch and the Hundred Knight 2	PS4		RPG		NIS America	
March 28	Long Gone Days	WIN, OSX, LIN		RPG		BURA	
March 29	Shining Resonance Refrain (JP)	PS4		RPG		Sega	
March 29	Super Robot Wars X (JP)	PS4, PSV		Tactical RPG		Bandai Namco Entertainment	

=== April–June ===
Release date	Title	Platform	Type	Genre	Developer	Publisher	Ref.
March 31	Baldi's Basics in Education and Learning	WIN, OSX		Horror, Educational, Puzzle		Mystman12	
April 3	Crisis on the Planet of the Apes VR	WIN, PS4, Quest		Action-adventure		FoxNext VR Studio	
April 3	King of Fighters '97 Global Match	WIN		Fighting		SNK	
April 3	Minit	WIN, PS4, XBO		Adventure		Devolver Digital	
April 3	Penny-Punching Princess	NS, PSV		Fighting		NIS America	
April 5	King of Fighters '97 Global Match	PS4, PSV		Fighting		SNK	
April 6	Global Soccer Manager 2018	WIN		Sports		Forever Young Games	
April 10	Dark Rose Valkyrie	WIN		RPG		Idea Factory International	
April 10	Extinction	WIN, PS4, XBO		Hack and slash		Maximum Games	
April 10	Owlboy	PS4, XBO		Platformer, Adventure		D-Pad Studio	
April 10	Regalia: Of Men and Monarchs - Royal Edition	PS4		RPG		Crunching Koalas	
April 11	Hellblade: Senua's Sacrifice	XBO		Action-adventure		Ninja Theory	
April 11	Robocraft Infinity	XBO		Sandbox, Fighting		Freejam	
April 11	Ys Origin	XBO		Action RPG		DotEmu	
April 12	Death end re;Quest (JP)	PS4		RPG		Compile Heart	
April 12	Don't Starve	NS		Action-adventure, Survival		Klei Entertainment	
April 12	Regalia: Of Men and Monarchs - Royal Edition	NS		RPG		Crunching Koalas	
April 13	Asdivine Hearts	NS		RPG		Kemco	
April 13	Regalia: Of Men and Monarchs - Royal Edition	XBO		RPG		Crunching Koalas	
April 16	Ys VIII: Lacrimosa of Dana	WIN		Action RPG		NIS America	
April 17	Wild Guns Reloaded	NS		Shooting gallery		Natsume Atari	
April 17	Yakuza 6: The Song of Life	PS4		Action-adventure		Sega	
April 19	Aqua Moto Racing Utopia	WiiU		Racing		Zordix AB	
April 20	God of War	PS4	Original	Action-adventure		Sony Interactive Entertainment	
April 20	Nintendo Labo Robot Kit	NS		—N/a		Nintendo	
April 20	Nintendo Labo Variety Kit	NS		—N/a		Nintendo	
April 24	BattleTech	WIN, OSX, LIN		TBS		Paradox Interactive	
April 24	Firefighters: Airport Fire Department	NS		Simulation		United Independent Entertainment	
April 24	Firefighters: The Simulation	NS		Simulation		United Independent Entertainment	
April 24	Frostpunk	WIN		City builder, Survival		11 bit studios	
April 24	Gal Gun 2	NS, PS4		Shoot 'em up (rail)		PQube	
April 24	Hello Kitty Kruisers	NS		Racing (kart)		Rising Star Games	
April 24	South Park: The Fractured but Whole	NS		RPG		Ubisoft	
April 24	The Swords of Ditto	WIN, OSX, LIN, PS4		Action RPG, Roguelike		Devolver Digital	
April 25	Earth Defense Force 4.1: Wing Diver The Shooter	WIN		Shoot 'em up		D3 Publisher	
April 26	The Legend of Heroes: Trails of Cold Steel II: Kai (JP)	PS4		RPG		Nihon Falcom	
April 26	Light Fall	WIN, OSX, NS		Platformer		Bishop Games	
April 26	Saturday Morning RPG	NS		RPG		Mighty Rabbit Studios	
April 26	Super Robot Wars X	PS4, PSV		Tactical RPG		Bandai Namco Entertainment	
April 27	Aqua Moto Racing Utopia	NS		Racing		Bigben Interactive	
April 27	Psychedelica of the Black Butterfly	PSV		Visual novel		Aksys Games	
April 27	Snow Moto Racing Freedom	NS		Racing		Zordix AB	
May 1	Battlezone: Gold Edition	WIN, PS4, XBO		FPS		Rebellion Developments	
May 1	Super Mega Baseball 2	WIN, PS4, XBO		Sports		Metalhead Software	
May 3	Professional Construction: The Simulation	NS		Simulation		United Independent Entertainment	
May 3	Total War Saga: Thrones of Britannia	WIN		TBS, RTT		Sega	
May 4	City of Brass	WIN, PS4, XBO		Dungeon crawl		Uppercut Games	
May 4	Donkey Kong Country: Tropical Freeze	NS		Platformer		Nintendo	
May 8	Conan Exiles	WIN, PS4, XBO		Action-adventure, Survival		Funcom	
May 8	Pillars of Eternity II: Deadfire	WIN, OSX, LIN		RPG		Versus Evil	
May 8	Steins;Gate 0	WIN		Visual novel		Spike Chunsoft	
May 10	Laser League	WIN, PS4, XBO		Sports		505 Games	
May 14	Project Nimbus: Code Mirai	PS4		Action		KISS Publishing Ltd.	
May 15	Battle Chasers: Nightwar	NS		RPG		THQ Nordic	
May 15	Little Witch Academia: Chamber of Time	WIN, PS4		Action RPG		Bandai Namco Entertainment	
May 15	Omensight	WIN, PS4		Action RPG		Spearhead Games	
May 15	Shin Megami Tensei: Strange Journey Redux	3DS		RPG		Atlus	
May 15	Touhou Azure Reflections	PS4		Bullet hell		Unties	
May 15	Walden, a Game	PS4		Survival, Walking sim		USC Games	
May 16	Floor Kids	WIN		Rhythm		MERJ Media	
May 17	The Banner Saga	NS		Tactical RPG		Versus Evil	
May 17	FAR: Lone Sails	WIN		Adventure		Mixtvision	
May 17	Yonder: The Cloud Catcher Chronicles	NS		Adventure		Prideful Sloth, Merge Games	
May 18	Hyrule Warriors: Definitive Edition	NS		Action, Hack and slash		Nintendo	
May 18	Little Nightmares: Complete Edition	NS		Puzzle-platformer, Survival horror		Bandai Namco Entertainment	
May 21	The Elder Scrolls Online: Summerset	WIN, OSX		MMO, RPG		Bethesda Softworks	
May 22	Mega Man Legacy Collection	NS		Action, Platformer		Capcom	
May 22	Mega Man Legacy Collection 2	NS		Action, Platformer		Capcom	
May 22	Runner3	WIN, OSX, NS		Platformer, Rhythm		Choice Provisions	
May 22	Stardew Valley	PSV		Simulation, RPG		ConcernedApe, Chucklefish	
May 22	State of Decay 2	WIN, XBO		Survival horror		Microsoft Studios	
May 22	Tennis World Tour	WIN, NS, PS4, XBO		Sports		Bigben Interactive	
May 24	Biohazard 7: Resident Evil Cloud Version (JP)	NS	Port	Survival horror		Capcom	
May 24	Bloodstained: Curse of the Moon	WIN, NS, PS4, XBO, 3DS, PSV		Action		Inti Creates	
May 24	Dillon's Dead-Heat Breakers	3DS		Action, Tower defense		Nintendo	
May 24	Persona 3: Dancing in Moonlight (JP)	PS4, PSV		Rhythm		Atlus	
May 24	Persona 4: Dancing All Night (JP)	PS4		Rhythm		Atlus	
May 24	Persona 5: Dancing in Starlight (JP)	PS4, PSV		Rhythm		Atlus	
May 24	Punch Club	NS		Sports management		tinyBuild	
May 25	7'scarlet	PSV		Visual novel		Aksys Games	
May 25	Dark Souls Remastered	WIN, PS4, XBO		Action RPG		FromSoftware, Bandai Namco Entertainment	
May 25	Detroit: Become Human	PS4	Original	Action-adventure		Sony Interactive Entertainment	
May 25	Sudden Strike 4: European Battlefields Edition	XBO		RTT		Kalypso Media	
May 29	Agony	WIN, PS4, XBO		Survival horror		PlayWay	
May 29	Fallen Legion: Rise to Glory	NS		Tactical RPG		NIS America	
May 29	Harvest Moon: Light of Hope Special Edition	NS, PS4		Simulation, RPG		Natsume Inc.	
May 29	Ikaruga	NS		Shoot 'em up		Nicalis	
May 29	Legend of Kay Anniversary	NS		Action-adventure, Platformer		THQ Nordic	
May 29	Moonlighter	WIN		Action RPG, Roguelike		11 bit studios	
May 29	Mothergunship	WIN, PS4, XBO		FPS		Grip Digital	
May 29	Sega Genesis Classics	WIN, PS4, XBO		—N/a		Sega	
May 29	Street Fighter 30th Anniversary Collection	WIN, NS, PS4, XBO		Fighting		Capcom	
May 29	Yoku's Island Express	WIN, NS, PS4, XBO		Platformer, Pinball, Adventure		Team17	
May 30	Cultist Simulator	WIN, OSX, LIN		Simulation		Humble Bundle	
May 30	Pokémon Quest	NS		Action-adventure		Nintendo	
May 31	Full Metal Panic! Fight: Who Dares Wins (JP)	PS4		Strategy, RPG		Bandai Namco Entertainment	
May 31	Just Shapes & Beats	WIN, NS, PS4, XBO		Rhythm		Berzerk Studio	
May 31	Liar Princess and the Blind Prince (JP)	NS, PS4, PSV		Action-adventure		Nippon Ichi Software	
May 31	Overload	WIN, OSX, LIN		FPS, Shoot 'em up		Revival Productions	
June 5	BlazBlue: Cross Tag Battle	WIN, NS, PS4		Fighting		Arc System Works	
June 5	The Elder Scrolls Online: Summerset	PS4, XBO		MMO, RPG		Bethesda Softworks	
June 5	Happy Birthdays	NS		Life sim		NIS America	
June 5	Nobunaga's Ambition: Taishi	WIN, PS4		Strategy		Koei Tecmo	
June 5	Onrush	PS4, XBO		Vehicular combat		Codemasters	
June 5	Shaq Fu: A Legend Reborn	WIN, NS, PS4, XBO		Brawler		Mad Dog Games	
June 5	Vampyr	WIN, PS4, XBO		Action RPG		Focus Home Interactive	
June 5	Warhammer 40,000: Inquisitor – Martyr	WIN, PS4, XBO		Action, Hack and slash		NeocoreGames	
June 7	The Banner Saga 2	NS		Tactical RPG		Versus Evil	
June 7	Flashback: Remastered Edition	NS		Cinematic platformer		Microids	
June 7	MotoGP 18	WIN, NS, PS4, XBO		Racing		Milestone srl	
June 8	Muv-Luv	PSV		Visual novel		PQube	
June 8	Muv-Luv Alternative	PSV		Visual novel		PQube	
June 8	Sushi Striker: The Way of Sushido	NS, 3DS		Action, Puzzle		Nintendo	
June 9	Unravel Two	WIN, PS4, XBO		Puzzle-platformer		Electronic Arts	
June 10	Fallout Shelter	NS, PS4		CMS		Bethesda Softworks	
June 12	Fortnite Battle Royale	NS		Battle royale		Epic Games	
June 12	Hollow Knight	NS		Metroidvania		Team Cherry	
June 12	Jurassic World Evolution	WIN, PS4, XBO		Business sim		Frontier Developments	
June 12	Paladins	NS		TPS		Hi-Rez Studios	
June 12	Super Bomberman R	WIN, PS4, XBO		Action, Maze		Konami	
June 13	Nostalgic Train (JP)	WIN		Walking sim		Tatamibeya	
June 14	R.B.I. Baseball 18	NS		Sports		MLB Advanced Media	
June 14	Wreckfest	WIN		Vehicular combat, Racing		THQ Nordic	
June 15	Among Us	iOS, DROID		Party, Social deduction		Innersloth	
June 15	Lego The Incredibles	WIN, NS, PS4, XBO		Action-adventure		Warner Bros. Interactive Entertainment	
June 19	The Lost Child	NS, PS4, PSV		RPG		NIS America	
June 21	Echo VR	Quest		Sports		Oculus Studios	
June 21	MUSYNX	NS		Rhythm		PM Studios	
June 21	Vegas Party	NS		Digital tabletop		Funbox Media	
June 22	Mario Tennis Aces	NS		Sports		Nintendo	
June 22	New Gundam Breaker	PS4		Action		Bandai Namco Entertainment	
June 26	The Awesome Adventures of Captain Spirit	WIN, PS4, XBO	Original	Graphic adventure		Square Enix	
June 26	De Blob	NS		Platformer, Puzzle		THQ Nordic	
June 26	Lumines Remastered	WIN, NS, PS4, XBO		Puzzle		Enhance Games	
June 26	Nier: Automata	XBO	Port	Action RPG		Square Enix	
June 26	The Night Journey	WIN, OSX, PS4		Art		USC Games	
June 26	Rainbow Skies	PS4, PS3, PSV		RPG		Eastasiasoft	
June 26	Ys VIII: Lacrimosa of Dana	NS		Action RPG		NIS America	
June 27	Ultimate Custom Night	WIN		Survival horror, PCA		Scott Cawthon	
June 28	Fighting EX Layer	PS4		Fighting		Arika	
June 28	Inside	NS		Puzzle-platformer		Playdead	
June 28	Limbo	NS		Puzzle-platformer		Playdead	
June 28	Next Up Hero	PS4, XBO		Action, Dungeon crawl		Aspyr	
June 28	Spirit Hunter: Death Mark (JP)	NS		Adventure, Visual novel		Experience Inc.	
June 29	Crash Bandicoot N. Sane Trilogy	WIN, NS, XBO		Platformer		Activision	
June 29	The Crew 2	WIN, PS4, XBO		Racing		Ubisoft	
June 29	MXGP Pro	WIN, PS4, XBO		Racing		Milestone srl	
June 29	Psychedelica of the Ashen Hawk	PSV		Visual novel		Aksys Games	
June 29	Wolfenstein II: The New Colossus	NS	Port	FPS, Action-adventure		Bethesda Softworks	

=== July–September ===
Release date	Title	Platform	Type	Genre	Developer	Publisher	Ref.
July 3	Red Faction Guerrilla: Re-Mars-tered Edition	WIN, PS4, XBO		TPS		THQ Nordic	
July 3	Runbow	NS		Platformer, Racing		13AM Games	
July 10	Hotel Transylvania 3: Monsters Overboard	WIN, NS, PS4, XBO		Action		Outright Games	
July 10	Hunting Simulator	NS		Adventure		Bigben Interactive	
July 10	Indie Pogo	WIN		Fighting		Lowe Bros. Studios	
July 10	Shining Resonance Refrain	WIN, NS, PS4, XBO		RPG		Sega	
July 11	Warhammer: Vermintide 2	XBO		Action		Fatshark	
July 13	Captain Toad: Treasure Tracker	NS, 3DS		Puzzle-platformer		Nintendo	
July 13	Octopath Traveler	NS		RPG, Adventure		Square Enix, Nintendo	
July 17	Adventure Time: Pirates of the Enchiridion	WIN, NS, PS4, XBO		Adventure		Outright Games	
July 17	Sonic Mania Plus	NS, PS4, XBO		Platformer, Action		Sega	
July 17	Touhou Genso Wanderer: Reloaded	NS, PS4		Roguelike		NIS America	
July 19	Closed Nightmare (JP)	NS, PS4		Survival horror		Nippon Ichi Software	
July 19	Taiko no Tatsujin: Drum 'n' Fun! (JP)	NS		Music, Rhythm		Bandai Namco Entertainment	
July 24	The Banner Saga 3	WIN, OSX, NS, PS4, XBO		Tactical RPG		Versus Evil	
July 24	Mega Man X Legacy Collection	WIN, NS, PS4, XBO		Action, Platformer		Capcom	
July 24	No Man's Sky	XBO		Action-adventure, Survival		Hello Games	
July 24	The Persistence	PS4		Survival horror		Firesprite	
July 25	Ys: Memories of Celceta	WIN		Action RPG		Xseed Games	
July 26	Candle: The Power of the Flame	NS		Platformer, Adventure, Puzzle		Merge Games	
July 26	Heaven Will Be Mine	WIN, OSX, LIN		Visual novel		Pillow Fight Games	
July 26	Mobile Suit Gundam: Battle Operation 2 (JP)	PS4		Action		Bandai Namco Entertainment	
July 27	Go Vacation	NS		Sports		Nintendo	
July 27	Head AS Code	WIN		Visual novel		Miracle Moon	
July 27	Hello Neighbor	NS, PS4, iOS, DROID		Stealth, Survival horror		tinyBuild	
July 29	Raid: Shadow Legends	WIN, iOS, DROID		Action RPG		Plarium Games	
July 31	Chasm	WIN, PS4, PSV		Action RPG, Platformer		Bit Kid Inc.	
July 31	Code of Princess EX	NS		Action RPG		Nicalis	
July 31	This Is the Police 2	WIN, OSX, LIN		Adventure, Strategy		THQ Nordic	
July 31	Titan Quest	NS		Action RPG, Hack and slash		THQ Nordic	
August 1	Yakuza 0	WIN		Action-adventure		Sega	
August 2	Salt and Sanctuary	NS		Action RPG, Platformer		Ska Studios	
August 3	WarioWare Gold	3DS		Action, Rhythm		Nintendo	
August 7	Dead Cells	WIN, OSX, LIN, NS, PS4, XBO		Metroidvania, Roguelike		Motion Twin	
August 7	Flipping Death	WIN, NS, PS4, XBO		Adventure		Thunderful Publishing	
August 7	Overcooked 2	WIN, NS, PS4, XBO		Simulation		Team17	
August 9	Layton's Mystery Journey DX (JP)	NS		Puzzle, Adventure		Level-5	
August 9	Minit	NS		Adventure		Devolver Digital	
August 9	Monster Hunter: World	WIN		Action RPG		Capcom	
August 9	Ōkami HD	NS		Action-adventure		Capcom	
August 9	Yakuza 3 (JP)	PS4		Action-adventure		Sega	
August 10	Madden NFL 19	WIN, PS4, XBO		Sports		EA Sports	
August 10	We Happy Few	WIN, PS4, XBO		Survival		Gearbox Publishing	
August 14	Cosmic Star Heroine	NS		RPG		Zeboyd Games	
August 14	Death's Gambit	WIN, PS4		RPG		Adult Swim Games	
August 14	Tanglewood	GEN, WIN, OSX, LIN		Platformer		Big Evil Corporation	
August 14	The Walking Dead: The Final Season – Episode 1: Done Running	WIN, PS4, XBO, NS		Graphic adventure		Telltale Games	
August 14	World of Warcraft: Battle for Azeroth	WIN, OSX		MMO, RPG		Blizzard Entertainment	
August 15	Fernz Gate	XBO		RPG		Kemco	
August 15	Penguin Wars	NS		Action		Dispatch Games	
August 15	State of Mind	WIN, OSX, NS, PS4, XBO		Walking sim		Daedalic Entertainment	
August 16	Next Up Hero	NS		Action, Dungeon crawl		Aspyr	
August 21	All-Star Fruit Racing	WIN, NS, PS4, XBO		Racing		PQube	
August 21	Guacamelee! 2	WIN, PS4		Metroidvania, Platformer, Brawler		DrinkBox Studios	
August 21	Return of Double Dragon	SNES		Brawler		Retroism	
August 21	Shenmue	WIN, PS4, XBO		Action-adventure		Sega	
August 21	Shenmue II	WIN, PS4, XBO		Action-adventure		Sega	
August 23	The King's Bird	WIN		Platformer		Graffiti Games	
August 23	My Hero One's Justice (JP)	NS, PS4		Action		Bandai Namco Entertainment	
August 24	F1 2018	WIN, PS4, XBO		Racing		Codemasters	
August 24	Little Dragons Café	NS, PS4		Simulation, RPG		Aksys Games, Rising Star Games	
August 24	Night Trap: 25th Anniversary Edition	NS		Interactive film		Limited Run Games	
August 28	Aggressors: Ancient Rome	WIN		TBS, 4X		Slitherine Software	
August 28	Blade Strangers	WIN, NS, PS4		Fighting		Nicalis	
August 28	De Blob 2	NS		Platformer, Puzzle		THQ Nordic	
August 28	Donut County	WIN, OSX, PS4, iOS		Puzzle		Annapurna Interactive	
August 28	Fernz Gate	NS, PS4		RPG		Kemco	
August 28	Firewall: Zero Hour	PSVR		FPS		Sony Interactive Entertainment	
August 28	Into the Breach	NS		TBS		Subset Games	
August 28	Monster Hunter Generations Ultimate	NS		Action RPG		Capcom	
August 28	Pro Evolution Soccer 2019	WIN, PS4, XBO		Sports		Konami	
August 28	Strange Brigade	WIN, PS4, XBO		TPS		Rebellion Developments	
August 28	Sunless Sea: Zubmariner Edition	PS4		Roguelike		Failbetter Games	
August 28	Victor Vran: Overkill Edition	NS		Action RPG		Wired Productions	
August 28	Yakuza Kiwami 2	PS4		Action-adventure		Sega	
August 30	The Messenger	WIN, NS		Action, Platformer		Devolver Digital	
August 30	Two Point Hospital	WIN, OSX, LIN		Business sim		Sega	
August 31	Divinity: Original Sin II	PS4, XBO		RPG		Larian Studios, Bandai Namco Entertainment	
August 31	Naruto to Boruto: Shinobi Striker	WIN, PS4, XBO		Brawler		Bandai Namco Entertainment	
September 4	428: Shibuya Scramble	WIN, PS4		Visual novel		Spike Chunsoft, Ravenscourt	
September 4	Destiny 2: Forsaken	PS4, XBO		FPS		Activision	
September 4	Dragon Quest XI	WIN, PS4		RPG		Square Enix	
September 4	God Wars: The Complete Legend	NS		Tactical RPG		NIS America	
September 4	Planet Alpha	WIN, NS, PS4, XBO		Platformer		Team17	
September 6	Gone Home	NS		Walking sim		Annapurna Interactive	
September 7	Immortal: Unchained	WIN, PS4, XBO		Action RPG		Toadman Interactive, Game Odyssey Ltd.	
September 7	Marvel's Spider-Man	PS4	Original	Action-adventure			
September 7	NASCAR Heat 3	WIN, PS4, XBO		Racing		704Games	
September 7	NBA Live 19	PS4, XBO		Sports		EA Sports	
September 7	SNK Heroines: Tag Team Frenzy	NS, PS4		Fighting		SNK, NIS America	
September 7	Yo-Kai Watch Blasters: Red Cat Corp and White Dog Squad	3DS		RPG		Nintendo	
September 10	Dust: An Elysian Tail	NS		Action RPG, Hack and slash		Humble Hearts	
September 11	Boundless	PS4		MMO, Sandbox		Wonderstruck Games	
September 11	Dakar 18	WIN, PS4, XBO		Racing		Deep Silver	
September 11	NBA 2K19	WIN, NS, PS4, XBO		Sports		2K Sports	
September 11	Super Street: The Game	WIN, PS4, XBO		Racing		Lion Castle Entertainment	
September 13	Cities: Skylines	NS		City builder, CMS		Paradox Interactive	
September 13	Final Fantasy XV: Pocket Edition	NS		RPG		Square Enix	
September 13	Frozen Synapse 2	WIN, LIN, OSX		TBT		Mode 7 Games	
September 13	Spirit Hunter: NG (JP)	PSV		Adventure, Visual novel		Experience Inc.	
September 13	Wasteland 2: Director's Cut	NS		RPG		inXile Entertainment	
September 14	Black Clover: Quartet Knights	WIN, PS4		Action		Bandai Namco Entertainment	
September 14	NHL 19	PS4, XBO		Sports		EA Sports	
September 14	Shadow of the Tomb Raider	WIN, PS4, XBO	Original	Action-adventure		Square Enix	
September 18	Balloon Fight	NS		Action			
September 18	The Bard's Tale IV: Barrows Deep	WIN, OSX, LIN		Dungeon crawl		inXile Entertainment, Deep Silver	
September 18	Baseball	NS		Sports			
September 18	Capcom Beat 'Em Up Bundle	WIN, NS, PS4, XBO		Brawler		Capcom	
September 18	Donkey Kong	NS		Platformer			
September 18	Double Dragon	NS		Brawler			
September 18	Dr. Mario	NS		Puzzle			
September 18	Excitebike	NS		Racing			
September 18	Ghosts 'n Goblins	NS		Platformer			
September 18	Gradius	NS		Scrolling shooter			
September 18	Ice Climber	NS		Platformer			
September 18	Labyrinth of Refrain: Coven of Dusk	WIN, NS, PS4		RPG, Dungeon crawl		NIS America	
September 18	Legendary Fishing	NS, PS4		Fishing		Ubisoft	
September 18	The Legend of Zelda	NS		Action-adventure			
September 18	Mario Bros.	NS		Platformer			
September 18	Pro Wrestling	NS		Fighting, Sports			
September 18	River City Ransom	NS		Brawler, Action-adventure			
September 18	Scribblenauts Mega Pack	NS, PS4, XBO		Party		Warner Bros. Interactive Entertainment	
September 18	Soccer	NS		Sports			
September 18	Super Mario Bros.	NS		Platformer			
September 18	Super Mario Bros. 3	NS		Platformer			
September 18	Tecmo Bowl	NS		Sports			
September 18	Tennis	NS		Sports			
September 18	Undertale	NS		RPG		Toby Fox, 8-4	
September 18	Yoshi	NS		Puzzle			
September 20	8-bit ADV Steins;Gate (JP)	NS		Visual novel		Spike Chunsoft	
September 20	CrossCode	WIN, OSX, LIN		Action RPG		Deck13 Interactive	
September 20	MagiCat	NS		Puzzle, Platformer		Toge Productions	
September 20	Star Control: Origins	WIN		Strategy		Stardock Entertainment	
September 20	Steins;Gate Elite (JP)	NS, PS4, PSV		Visual novel		Spike Chunsoft	
September 20	Steins;Gate: Linear Bounded Phenogram (JP)	PS4		Visual novel		Spike Chunsoft	
September 21	Broken Sword 5: The Serpent's Curse	NS		PCA		Ravenscourt	
September 21	Xenoblade Chronicles 2: Torna – The Golden Country	NS		Action RPG		Nintendo	
September 25	Giana Sisters Twisted Dreams: Owltimate Edition	NS		Puzzle, Platformer		HandyGames	
September 25	Hollow Knight	PS4, XBO		Metroidvania		Team Cherry	
September 25	Metal Max Xeno	PS4		RPG		NIS America	
September 25	Pathfinder: Kingmaker	WIN, OSX, LIN		RPG		Deep Silver	
September 25	Psyvariar Delta	NS, PS4		Scrolling shooter		City Connection	
September 25	Punch Line	WIN, PS4, PSV		Adventure, Visual novel		PQube	
September 25	Revenant Dogma	WIN, NS, PS4, PSV		RPG		Kemco	
September 25	South Park: The Stick of Truth	NS		RPG		Ubisoft	
September 25	This Is the Police 2	NS, PS4, XBO		Adventure, Strategy		THQ Nordic	
September 25	Valkyria Chronicles 4	WIN, NS, PS4, XBO		Tactical RPG		Sega	
September 25	The Walking Dead: The Final Season – Episode 2: Suffer the Children	WIN, PS4, XBO, NS		Graphic adventure		Telltale Games	
September 26	Let It Die	WIN		Survival		GungHo Online Entertainment	
September 27	Dragalia Lost	iOS, DROID		RPG		Cygames, Nintendo	
September 27	Life Is Strange 2 – Episode 1: Roads	WIN, PS4, XBO		Graphic adventure		Square Enix	
September 27	Super Neptunia RPG (JP)	NS, PS4		RPG		Compile Heart	
September 27	Wandersong	WIN, NS		Adventure, Music		Humble Bundle	
September 28	Dragon Ball FighterZ	NS		Fighting		Bandai Namco Entertainment	
September 28	FIFA 19	WIN, NS, PS4, PS3, XBO, XB360		Sports		EA Sports	
September 28	Jake Hunter Detective Story: Ghost of the Dusk	3DS		Visual novel		Arc System Works	
September 28	ZeroRanger	WIN		Scrolling shooter		System Erasure	

=== October–December ===
Release date	Title	Platform	Type	Genre	Developer	Publisher	Ref.
October 2	Astro Bot Rescue Mission	PS4		Action, Platformer		Sony Interactive Entertainment	
October 2	Batman: The Enemy Within	NS		Graphic adventure		Telltale Games	
October 2	Fist of the North Star: Lost Paradise	PS4		Action-adventure		Sega	
October 2	Forza Horizon 4	WIN, XBO		Racing		Microsoft Studios	
October 2	Mega Man 11	WIN, NS, PS4, XBO		Action, Platformer		Capcom	
October 2	Valthirian Arc: Hero School Story	WIN, NS, PS4		Action RPG		PQube	
October 5	Assassin's Creed Odyssey	WIN, PS4, XBO	Original	Action-adventure, Stealth		Ubisoft	
October 5	Super Mario Party	NS		Party		Nintendo	
October 9	Disgaea 1 Complete	NS, PS4		Tactical RPG		NIS America	
October 9	Goosebumps: The Game	NS		Action, Puzzle		Game Mill Entertainment	
October 9	Mark of the Ninja: Remastered	WIN, NS, PS4, XBO		Action, Stealth		Klei Entertainment	
October 9	WWE 2K19	WIN, PS4, XBO		Sports (wrestling)		2K Sports	
October 10	NES Open Tournament Golf	NS		Sports			
October 10	Solomon's Key	NS		Puzzle, Platformer			
October 10	Super Dodge Ball	NS		Sports			
October 12	Call of Duty: Black Ops 4	WIN, PS4, XBO		FPS		Activision	
October 12	Luigi's Mansion	3DS		Action-adventure		Nintendo	
October 12	The Missing: J.J. Macfield and the Island of Memories	WIN, NS, PS4, XBO		Puzzle-platformer		Arc System Works	
October 12	The World Ends with You: Final Remix	NS		Action RPG		Square Enix	
October 16	Big Buck Hunter Arcade	NS		Shooter, Sports		GameMill Entertainment	
October 16	Crayola Scoot	WIN, NS, PS4, XBO		Sports		Outright Games	
October 16	Lego DC Super-Villains	WIN, NS, PS4, XBO		Action-adventure		Warner Bros. Interactive Entertainment	
October 16	NBA 2K Playgrounds 2	WIN, NS, PS4, XBO		Sports		2K Sports	
October 16	Overload	PS4, XBO		FPS, Shoot 'em up		Revival Productions	
October 16	Rapala Fishing Pro Series	NS		Sports		GameMill Entertainment	
October 16	Starlink: Battle for Atlas	NS, PS4, XBO		Action-adventure		Ubisoft	
October 16	Warriors Orochi 4	WIN, NS, PS4, XBO		Hack and slash		Koei Tecmo	
October 17	The Jackbox Party Pack 5	WIN, OSX, NS, PS4, XBO		Party		Jackbox Games	
October 18	Dies irae: Amantes amentes (JP)	NS		Visual novel		Views	
October 18	Return of the Obra Dinn	WIN, OSX		Puzzle, Adventure		3909	
October 18	SINNER: Sacarifice for Redemption	NS, PS4, XBO		Action RPG		Another Indie Studio	
October 18	Syberia 3	NS		Graphic adventure		Microids	
October 18	WILL: A Wonderful World	NS		Visual novel		Circle Entertainment	
October 19	Dark Souls Remastered	NS		Action RPG		FromSoftware, Bandai Namco Entertainment	
October 19	Soulcalibur VI	WIN, PS4, XBO		Fighting		Bandai Namco Entertainment	
October 19	The Unlikely Legend of Rusty Pup	WIN				Gory Detail Ltd.	
October 22	SINNER: Sacrifice for Redemption	WIN		Action RPG		Another Indie Studio	
October 23	Bass Pro Shops: The Strike – Championship Edition	NS		Fishing		Planet ENTMT	
October 23	Cabela's: The Hunt - Championship Edition	NS		Sports		Planet ENTMT	
October 23	Gwent: The Witcher Card Game	WIN		DCCG		CD Projekt	
October 23	Just Dance 2019	NS, PS4, XBO, XB360, WiiU, Wii		Music		Ubisoft	
October 23	Nickelodeon Kart Racers	NS, PS4, XBO		Racing (kart)		GameMill Entertainment	
October 23	PAW Patrol: On a Roll!	WIN, NS, PS4, XBO		Puzzle, Platformer		Outright Games	
October 23	Thronebreaker: The Witcher Tales	WIN		RPG		CD Projekt	
October 25	Chicken Range	NS		Shooter		Funbox Media	
October 25	Disaster Report 4 Plus: Summer Memories (JP)	PS4		Action-adventure		Granzella	
October 25	Eve: Burst Error R (JP)	NS		Visual novel		Red Flag Ship	
October 25	Spirit Hunter: Death Mark (JP)	XBO		Adventure, Visual novel		Experience Inc.	
October 26	Castlevania Requiem	PS4		—N/a		Konami	
October 26	My Hero One's Justice	WIN, NS, PS4, XBO		Action		Bandai Namco Entertainment	
October 26	Red Dead Redemption 2	PS4, XBO	Original	Action-adventure	Rockstar Games		
October 30	Call of Cthulhu	WIN, PS4, XBO		RPG, Survival horror		Focus Home Interactive	
October 30	Dream Daddy: Dadrector's Cut	PS4		Visual novel		Game Grumps	
October 30	Gal Metal	NS		Rhythm		Xseed Games	
October 30	Lego Harry Potter Collection	NS, XBO		Action-adventure		Warner Bros. Interactive Entertainment	
October 30	Mutant Football League: Dynasty Edition	NS		Sports		Digital Dreams Entertainment	
October 30	OK K.O.! Let's Play Heroes	NS		Action-adventure, Brawler		Outright Games	
October 30	Old School RuneScape	DROID, iOS		MMO, RPG		Jagex	
October 30	Save Me Mr Tako	WIN, NS		Platformer, Action RPG		Nicalis	
October 30	Sports Party	NS		Sports, Party		Ubisoft	
October 30	Steven Universe: Save the Light	NS		Action-adventure, RPG		Cartoon Network Games, Outright Games	
October 30	Yomawari: The Long Night Collection	NS		Survival horror		NIS America	
October 31	Deltarune: Chapter 1	WIN, OSX		RPG, Adventure		Toby Fox	
October 31	Hidden Folks	NS		Hidden object		Adriaan de Jongh	
October 31	Spirit Hunter: Death Mark	NS, PS4, PSV		Adventure, Visual novel		Aksys Games	
November 1	The Quiet Man	WIN, PS4		Action-adventure		Square Enix	
November 2	Diablo III: Eternal Collection	NS		Action RPG, Hack and slash		Blizzard Entertainment	
November 2	Taiko no Tatsujin: Drum 'n' Fun!	NS		Rhythm		Bandai Namco Entertainment	
November 2	Taiko no Tatsujin: Drum Session!	PS4		Rhythm		Bandai Namco Entertainment	
November 5	Moonlighter	NS		Action RPG		11 bit studios	
November 6	Carnival Games	NS		Party		2K Games	
November 6	Déraciné	PSVR		Adventure		Sony Interactive Entertainment	
November 6	The Forest	PS4		Survival		Endnight Games	
November 6	Grip: Combat Racing	WIN, NS, PS4, XBO		Racing		Wired Productions	
November 6	Omen of Sorrow	PS4		Fighting		SOEDESCO	
November 6	Overkill's The Walking Dead	WIN		FPS		Starbreeze Studios	
November 6	World of Final Fantasy Maxima	WIN, NS, PS4, XBO		RPG		Square Enix	
November 7	Tsioque	WIN		PCA		OhNoo Studio	
November 8	Despotism 3k	WIN, OSX, LIN		CMS		Konfa Games	
November 9	11-11: Memories Retold	WIN, PS4, XBO		Adventure		Bandai Namco Entertainment	
November 9	Tetris Effect	PS4		Puzzle		Enhance Games	
November 10	Black Souls II	WIN		RPG			
November 13	Hitman 2	WIN, PS4, XBO		Stealth		Warner Bros. Interactive Entertainment	
November 13	My Riding Stables - Life with Horses	NS		Simulation		Kalypso Media	
November 13	Project Highrise: Architect's Edition	NS		Simulation		Kalypso Media	
November 13	SNK 40th Anniversary Collection	NS		—N/a		SNK, NIS America	
November 13	Spyro Reignited Trilogy	PS4, XBO		Platformer		Activision	
November 14	Fallout 76	WIN, PS4, XBO		Action RPG		Bethesda Softworks	
November 14	Metroid	NS		Action-adventure			
November 14	Mighty Bomb Jack	NS		Platformer			
November 14	TwinBee	NS		Scrolling shooter			
November 15	Echo Combat	Quest		FPS		Oculus Studios	
November 15	Monkey King: Master of the Clouds	PS4		Shoot 'em up		UFO Interactive Games	
November 15	Psychedelica of the Black Butterfly	WIN		Visual novel		Idea Factory International	
November 15	Trailblazers	NS		Racing		Rising Star Games	
November 15	Underworld Ascendant	WIN, OSX, LIN		Action RPG		505 Games	
November 15	Warhammer 40,000: Mechanicus	WIN, OSX, LIN		TBT		Kasedo Games	
November 16	Pokémon: Let's Go, Pikachu! and Let's Go, Eevee!	NS		RPG		The Pokémon Company, Nintendo	
November 20	Battlefield V	WIN, PS4, XBO	Original	FPS		Electronic Arts	
November 20	Bendy and the Ink Machine	NS, PS4, XBO		Survival horror		Rooster Teeth Games	
November 20	Farming Simulator 19	WIN, OSX, PS4, XBO		Simulation		Focus Home Interactive	
November 20	Moto Racer 4	NS		Racing		Microids	
November 20	Wreckfest	PS4, XBO		Vehicular combat, Racing		THQ Nordic	
November 22	ATV Drift & Tricks	NS		Racing		Microids	
November 27	Darksiders III	WIN, PS4, XBO		Hack and slash, Action-adventure		THQ Nordic	
November 27	Spintires: Mudrunner – American Wilds Edition	NS		Vehicle sim		Focus Home Interactive	
November 28	Artifact	WIN, OSX, LIN		DCCG		Valve	
November 29	Ketsui Deathtiny: Kizuna Jigoku Tachi (JP)	PS4		Shoot 'em up		M2	
November 29	Parkitect	WIN, OSX, LIN		CMS		Texel Raptor	
November 29	Persona Q2: New Cinema Labyrinth (JP)	3DS		RPG, Dungeon crawl		Atlus	
November 30	Ark: Survival Evolved	NS		Action-adventure, Survival		Studio Wildcard	
November 30	Fighting EX Layer	WIN		Fighting		Arika	
November 30	Ride 3	WIN, PS4, XBO		Racing		Milestone srl	
December 4	Gear.Club Unlimited 2	NS		Racing		Microids	
December 4	Gwent: The Witcher Card Game	PS4, XBO		DCCG		CD Projekt	
December 4	Just Cause 4	WIN, PS4, XBO		Action-adventure		Square Enix	
December 4	Monster Boy and the Cursed Kingdom	NS, PS4, XBO		Platformer		FDG Entertainment	
December 4	Mutant Year Zero: Road to Eden	WIN, PS4, XBO		TBS		Funcom	
December 4	Override: Mech City Brawl	WIN, PS4, XBO		Fighting		Modus Games	
December 4	Persona 3: Dancing in Moonlight	PS4, PSV		Rhythm		Atlus	
December 4	Persona 4: Dancing All Night	PS4		Rhythm		Atlus	
December 4	Persona 5: Dancing in Starlight	PS4, PSV		Rhythm		Atlus	
December 4	Subnautica	PS4, XBO		Adventure, Survival		Unknown Worlds Entertainment	
December 4	Thronebreaker: The Witcher Tales	PS4, XBO		RPG		CD Projekt	
December 4	Toki	NS		Action, Platformer		Microids	
December 6	Ashen	WIN, XBO		Action RPG		Annapurna Interactive	
December 6	Jagged Alliance: Rage!	WIN, PS4, XBO		TBT		HandyGames	
December 6	The Last Remnant Remastered	PS4		RPG		Square Enix	
December 7	Katamari Damacy Reroll	WIN, NS		Puzzle, Action		Bandai Namco Entertainment	
December 7	Path of Exile	PS4		Action RPG, Hack and slash		Grinding Gear Games	
December 7	PlayerUnknown's Battlegrounds	PS4		Battle royale		PUBG Corporation	
December 7	Sega Genesis Classics	NS		—N/a		Sega	
December 7	Super Smash Bros. Ultimate	NS		Fighting		Nintendo	
December 11	Earth Defense Force 5	PS4		Action		D3 Publisher	
December 11	Fear & Hunger	WIN		RPG	Miro Haverinen	Miro Haverinen	
December 11	Kingdom Two Crowns	WIN, OSX, PS4, NS, XBO		Strategy		Raw Fury	
December 12	Adventures of Lolo	NS		Action, Puzzle			
December 12	Adventures of Lolo (JP)	NS		Action, Puzzle			
December 12	Insurgency: Sandstorm	WIN		FPS		Focus Home Interactive	
December 12	Ninja Gaiden	NS		Hack and slash, Platformer			
December 12	Wario's Woods	NS		Puzzle			
December 13	Alternate Jake Hunter: Daedalus The Awakening of Golden Jazz	NS, PS4, WIN		Adventure, visual novel		Arc System Works	
December 13	DayZ	WIN		FPS, TPS, Survival		Bohemia Interactive	
December 13	God Eater 3 (JP)	PS4		Action RPG		Bandai Namco Entertainment	
December 13	GRIS	WIN, OSX, NS		Adventure, Platformer		Devolver Digital	
December 13	Judgment (JP)	PS4		Action		Sega	
December 13	Omensight: The Definitive Edition	NS		Action RPG		Spearhead Games	
December 14	Below	WIN, XBO		Action-adventure, Roguelike		Capybara Games	
December 14	Borderlands 2 VR	PS4		Action RPG, FPS		2K Games	
December 18	Asdivine Hearts II	WIN		RPG		Kemco	
December 18	London Detective Mysteria	PSV		Visual novel		Xseed Games	
December 18	Warhammer: Vermintide 2	PS4		Action		Fatshark	
December 20	Dragon Quest Builders 2 (JP)	NS, PS4		Sandbox, Action RPG		Square Enix	
December 20	Lemmings	iOS, DROID		Puzzle		Exient Entertainment	
December 21	Asdivine Hearts II	XBO		RPG		Kemco	
