= List of role-playing video games: 2018 to 2019 =

This is a comprehensive index of commercial role-playing video games (RPGs), sorted chronologically by year. Information regarding release platform, release type, RPG subgenre, game setting, developers, publishers, and country of origin is provided where available. The table can be sorted by clicking on the small boxes next to the column headings.

This list includes all RPG subgenres, including MMORPGs, Action RPGs and Tactical RPGs. This list does not include MUDs and Roguelikes by default, unless they have an additional RPG subgenre. For standalone lists on these subgenres, see List of MUDs and List of roguelikes

== Legend ==
Video game platforms
3DS	Nintendo 3DS, 3DS Virtual Console, iQue 3DS	DROID	Android	iOS	iOS, iPhone, iPod, iPadOS, iPad, visionOS, Apple Vision Pro
LIN	Linux, SteamOS	Luna	Amazon Luna	NS	Nintendo Switch
OSX	macOS	PS4	PlayStation 4	PSV	PlayStation Vita
Quest	Meta Quest / Oculus Quest family, including Oculus Rift	Stadia	Google Stadia	WIN	Windows, all versions Windows 95 and up
XBO	Xbox One	XBX/S	Xbox Series X/S		

Types of releases
Compilation	A compilation, anthology or collection of several titles, usually (but not always) belonging to the same series
Early access	A game launched in early access is unfinished and thus might contain bugs and glitches or have some of the content missing
Episodic	An episodic video game that is released in batches over a period of time
Expansion	A large-scale DLC to an already existing game that adds new story, areas and additions and/or changes to the game's mechanics
Full release	A full release of a game that launched in early access first
Limited	A special release (often called "Limited" or "Collector's Edition") with bonus collector's material. Often provided to people who pre-order a game
Port	The game first appeared on a different platform and a port was made. The game is like the original, with few or no differences
Remake	The game is an enhanced remake of an original, made using a new engine and/or assets and thus containing completely new sound, graphics and possibly changes to the story and/or gameplay
Remaster	The game is a remaster of an original, released on the same or different platform, with (usually minor) changes to graphics, sound and/or gameplay
Rerelease	The game was re-released on the same platform with no or only minor changes

Video game genres
Action RPG	Action role-playing game	Dungeon crawl	Dungeon crawl	JRPG	Japanese-style role-playing game
MMORPG	Massively multiplayer online RPG	Monster tamer	Monster-taming game	MUD	Multi-user dungeon
Real-time	Real-time game	Roguelike	Roguelike, Roguelite	Sandbox	Sandbox game
Soulslike	Soulslike	Tactical RPG	Tactical role-playing game	Turn-based	Turn-based game

== List ==
Year	Title	Platform	Type	RPG Subgenre	Setting	Developer	Publisher	COO	Ref.
2018	The Alliance Alive	3DS					Atlus		
2018 (JP)	Arc of Alchemist	PS4, NS	Original	Action RPG	Fantasy	Compile Heart	Idea Factory	JP	
2018	Asdivine Hearts	NS					Kemco		
2018	Asdivine Hearts II	WIN, XBO					Kemco		
2018 (WW)	Ashen	WIN, XBO	Original	Action RPG	Fantasy	A44	Annapurna Interactive	NZ	
2018 (WW)	Assassin's Creed Odyssey	PS4, WIN, NS, XBO, Stadia	Original	Action RPG	Historical, Sci-fi	Ubisoft Quebec	Ubisoft	CA	
2018 (WW)	Atelier Arland Series Deluxe Pack	PS4, NS, WIN	Compilation	Turn-based, JRPG	Fantasy	Gust	Koei Tecmo	JP	
2018	Atelier Lydie & Suelle: The Alchemists and the Mysterious Paintings	WIN, NS, PS4					Koei Tecmo		
2018 (WW)	Atelier Meruru: The Apprentice of Arland DX	PS4, NS, WIN	Port	Turn-based, JRPG	Fantasy	Gust	Koei Tecmo	JP	
2018 (WW)	Atelier Rorona: The Alchemist of Arland DX	PS4, NS, WIN	Port	Turn-based, JRPG	Fantasy	Gust	Koei Tecmo	JP	
2018 (WW)	Atelier Totori: The Adventurer of Arland DX	PS4, NS, WIN	Port	Turn-based, JRPG	Fantasy	Gust	Koei Tecmo	JP	
2018	The Banner Saga	NS		Tactical RPG			Versus Evil		
2018	The Banner Saga 2	NS		Tactical RPG			Versus Evil		
2018	The Banner Saga 3	WIN, OSX, NS, PS4, XBO		Tactical RPG			Versus Evil		
2018	The Bard's Tale IV: Barrows Deep	WIN, OSX, LIN		Dungeon crawl			inXile Entertainment, Deep Silver		
2018	Battle Chasers: Nightwar	NS					THQ Nordic		
2018	Black Souls II	WIN							
2018 (JP)	Book of Demons	WIN, NS	Original	Action RPG	Fantasy	Thing Trunk		PL	
2018	Borderlands 2 VR	PS4		Action RPG			2K Games		
2018	Call of Cthulhu	WIN, PS4, XBO					Focus Home Interactive		
2018	Chasm	WIN, PS4, PSV		Action RPG			Bit Kid Inc.		
2018	City of Brass	WIN, PS4, XBO		Dungeon crawl			Uppercut Games		
2018	Code of Princess EX	NS		Action RPG			Nicalis		
2018	Cosmic Star Heroine	NS					Zeboyd Games		
2018 (WW)	CrossCode	WIN, OSX, LIN	Original	Action RPG	Fantasy	Radical Fish Games	Deck13 Interactive	DE	
2018 (WW)	Crystar	PS4, WIN, NS	Original	Action RPG	Supernatural	Gemdrops	JP: FuRyu; WW: Spike Chunsoft, NIS America	JP	
2018	Damascus Gear: Operation Osaka	WIN, PS4, PSV		Action RPG			Arc System Works		
2018	Dark Rose Valkyrie	WIN					Idea Factory International		
2018	Dark Souls Remastered	WIN, PS4, XBO, NS		Action RPG			FromSoftware, Bandai Namco Entertainment		
2018	Darkest Dungeon	NS, XBO		Dungeon crawl			Red Hook Studios		
2018 (JP)	Death end re;Quest	PS4	Original	Turn-based, JRPG	Sci-fi	Compile Heart, Idea Factory	Idea Factory	JP	
2018	Death's Gambit	WIN, PS4					Adult Swim Games		
2018	Deltarune: Chapter 1	WIN, OSX					Toby Fox		
2018	Diablo III: Eternal Collection	NS		Action RPG			Blizzard Entertainment		
2018	Digimon Story: Cyber Sleuth – Hacker's Memory	PS4, PSV					Bandai Namco Entertainment		
2018	Disgaea 1 Complete	NS, PS4		Tactical RPG			NIS America		
2018	Dissidia Final Fantasy NT	PS4		Action RPG			Square Enix		
2018	Divinity: Original Sin II	PS4, XBO					Larian Studios, Bandai Namco Entertainment		
2018	Dragalia Lost	iOS, DROID					Cygames, Nintendo		
2018	Dragon Quest Builders	NS		Action RPG			Nintendo		
2018 (JP)	Dragon Quest Builders 2	NS, PS4		Action RPG			Square Enix		
2018	Dragon Quest XI	WIN, PS4					Square Enix		
2018 (JP)	Dragon Star Varnir	PS4	Original	Turn-based, JRPG	Fantasy	Compile Heart	Idea Factory	JP	
2018	Dust: An Elysian Tail	NS		Action RPG			Humble Hearts		
2018	The Elder Scrolls Online: Summerset	PS4, XBO, WIN, OSX		MMORPG			Bethesda Softworks		
2018	The Escapists 2	NS					Team17		
2018 (JP)	Etrian Odyssey Nexus	3DS	Original	Turn-based, Dungeon crawl, JRPG	Fantasy	Atlus		JP	
2018	Fallen Legion: Rise to Glory	NS		Tactical RPG			NIS America		
2018 (WW)	Fallout 76	WIN, PS4, XBO	Original	Action RPG	Fantasy	Bethesda Game Studios	Bethesda Softworks	US	
2018	Fear Effect Sedna	WIN, NS, PS4, XBO					Forever Entertainment		
2018	Fernz Gate	NS, PS4, XBO					Kemco		
2018 (WW)	Final Fantasy XV: Pocket Edition	DROID, NS	Remake	Action RPG	Fantasy	Square Enix, XPEC Entertainment, SummerTimeStudio	Square Enix	JP	
2018	Final Fantasy XV: Windows Edition	WIN		Action RPG			Square Enix		
2018 (JP)	Full Metal Panic! Fight: Who Dares Wins	PS4					Bandai Namco Entertainment		
2018 (WW)	Ghost of a Tale	WIN, PS4, XBO, NS, Luna	Original	Action RPG	Fantasy	SeithCG		FR	
2018 (JP)	God Eater 3	PS4		Action RPG			Bandai Namco Entertainment		
2018	God Wars: The Complete Legend	NS		Tactical RPG			NIS America		
2018	Harvest Moon: Light of Hope Special Edition	NS, PS4					Natsume Inc.		
2018	Heroine Anthem Zero—Episode 1	PS4		Action RPG			WindThunder Studio		
2018	Immortal: Unchained	WIN, PS4, XBO		Action RPG			Toadman Interactive, Game Odyssey Ltd.		
2018 (WW)	Infinite Adventures	PS4, XBO, WIN	Original	Turn-based, Dungeon crawl, JRPG	Fantasy	Stormseeker Games		US	
2018 (WW)	Jimmy and the Pulsating Mass	WIN	Original	Turn-based, JRPG	Sci-fi	Kasey Ozymy		US	
2018 (WW)	Kingdom Come: Deliverance	WIN, PS4, XBO	Original	Action RPG	Historical	Warhorse Studios	Deep Silver, Warhorse Studios	CZ	
2018	Labyrinth of Refrain: Coven of Dusk	WIN, NS, PS4		Dungeon crawl			NIS America		
2018 (KR)	Last Origin	DROID, iOS	Original	Turn-based	Post-apocalyptic	SmartJoy		KR	
2018	The Last Remnant Remastered	PS4					Square Enix		
2018	The Legend of Heroes: Trails of Cold Steel II	WIN					Xseed Games		
2018 (JP)	The Legend of Heroes: Trails of Cold Steel II: Kai	PS4					Nihon Falcom		
2018 (JP)	The Legend of Heroes: Trails of Cold Steel IV	PS4	Original	Turn-based, JRPG	Science fantasy	Nihon Falcom		JP	
2018 (WW)	Legrand Legacy: Tale of the Fatebounds	WIN	Original	Turn-based, JRPG	Fantasy	SEMISOFT	Another Indie	ID	
2018	Little Dragons Café	NS, PS4					Aksys Games, Rising Star Games		
2018	Little Witch Academia: Chamber of Time	WIN, PS4		Action RPG			Bandai Namco Entertainment		
2018	Long Gone Days	WIN, OSX, LIN					BURA		
2018	The Longest 5 Minutes	WIN, NS, PSV					NIS America		
2018	The Lost Child	NS, PS4, PSV					NIS America		
2018	Lost Sphear	WIN, NS, PS4					Square Enix		
2018 (WW)	Metal Max Xeno	PS4	Original	Turn-based, JRPG	Post-apocalyptic	Kadokawa Games, Cattle Call, 24Frame	JP: Kadokawa Games; NA, EU: NIS America	JP	
2018	Monster Hunter Generations Ultimate	NS		Action RPG			Capcom		
2018 (WW)	Monster Hunter: World	WIN, PS4, XBO	Original	Action RPG	Fantasy	Capcom		JP	
2018	Moonlighter	NS, WIN		Action RPG, Roguelike			11 bit studios		
2018	Next Up Hero	PS4, XBO, NS		Dungeon crawl			Aspyr		
2018	Ni no Kuni II: Revenant Kingdom	WIN, PS4					Bandai Namco Entertainment		
2018	Nier: Automata	XBO		Action RPG			Square Enix		
2018 (WW)	Octopath Traveler	NS	Original	Turn-based, JRPG	Fantasy	Square Enix, Acquire	Square Enix, Nintendo	JP	
2018	Old School RuneScape	DROID, iOS		MMORPG			Jagex		
2018	Omensight	WIN, PS4		Action RPG			Spearhead Games		
2018	Omensight: The Definitive Edition	NS		Action RPG			Spearhead Games		
2018	Path of Exile	PS4		Action RPG			Grinding Gear Games		
2018	Pathfinder: Kingmaker	WIN, OSX, LIN					Deep Silver		
2018 (JP)	Persona Q2: New Cinema Labyrinth	3DS	Original	Turn-based, Dungeon crawl, JRPG	Urban fantasy	Atlus		JP	
2018 (WW)	Pillars of Eternity II: Deadfire	WIN, OSX, LIN	Original		Fantasy	Obsidian Entertainment	Versus Evil	US	
2018	Pit People	WIN, XBO		Action RPG			The Behemoth		
2018 (WW)	Pokémon: Let's Go, Pikachu! and Let's Go, Eevee!	NS	Remake	Turn-based, Monster raising	Fantasy	Game Freak	Nintendo	JP	
2018	Pokémon: Let's Go, Pikachu! and Let's Go, Eevee!	NS		Monster tamer			The Pokémon Company, Nintendo		
2018	Radiant Historia: Perfect Chronology	3DS					Atlus		
2018	Raid: Shadow Legends	WIN, iOS, DROID		Action RPG			Plarium Games		
2018	Rainbow Skies	PS4, PS3, PSV					Eastasiasoft		
2018	Regalia: Of Men and Monarchs - Royal Edition	NS, PS4, XBO					Crunching Koalas		
2018	Revenant Dogma	WIN, NS, PS4, PSV					Kemco		
2018 (JP)	SaGa: Scarlet Grace - Ambitions	PS4, NS, WIN, DROID, iOS	Port	Turn-based, Sandbox	Fantasy	Square Enix, Studio Reel	Square Enix	JP	
2018	Salt and Sanctuary	NS		Action RPG			Ska Studios		
2018	Saturday Morning RPG	NS					Mighty Rabbit Studios		
2018	Save Me Mr Tako	WIN, NS		Action RPG			Nicalis		
2018	Secret of Mana	WIN, PS4, PSV		Action RPG			Square Enix		
2018	Shin Megami Tensei: Strange Journey Redux	3DS					Atlus		
2018 (WW)	Shining Resonance Refrain	WIN, NS, PS4, XBO					Sega		
2018	SINNER: Sacarifice for Redemption	NS, PS4, XBO		Action RPG			Another Indie Studio		
2018	SINNER: Sacrifice for Redemption	WIN		Action RPG			Another Indie Studio		
2018	South Park: The Fractured but Whole	NS					Ubisoft		
2018	South Park: The Stick of Truth	NS					Ubisoft		
2018	Stardew Valley	PSV					ConcernedApe, Chucklefish		
2018	Steven Universe: Save the Light	NS					Cartoon Network Games, Outright Games		
2018 (JP)	Super Neptunia RPG	NS, PS4					Compile Heart		
2018 (WW)	Super Robot Wars X	PS4, PSV		Tactical RPG			Bandai Namco Entertainment		
2018	The Swords of Ditto	WIN, OSX, LIN, PS4		Action RPG, Roguelike			Devolver Digital		
2018	Thronebreaker: The Witcher Tales	PS4, XBO, WIN					CD Projekt		
2018	Titan Quest	NS		Action RPG			THQ Nordic		
2018	Undertale	NS					Toby Fox, 8-4		
2018	Underworld Ascendant	WIN, OSX, LIN		Action RPG			505 Games		
2018 (WW)	Valkyria Chronicles 4	WIN, NS, PS4, XBO		Tactical RPG			Sega		
2018	Valthirian Arc: Hero School Story	WIN, NS, PS4		Action RPG			PQube		
2018	Vampyr	WIN, PS4, XBO		Action RPG			Focus Home Interactive		
2018	Victor Vran: Overkill Edition	NS		Action RPG			Wired Productions		
2018	Wasteland 2: Director's Cut	NS					inXile Entertainment		
2018	The Witch and the Hundred Knight 2	PS4					NIS America		
2018	The World Ends with You: Final Remix	NS		Action RPG			Square Enix		
2018	World of Final Fantasy Maxima	WIN, NS, PS4, XBO					Square Enix		
2018	World of Warcraft: Battle for Azeroth	WIN, OSX		MMORPG			Blizzard Entertainment		
2018	Xenoblade Chronicles 2: Torna – The Golden Country	NS		Action RPG			Nintendo		
2018	Yo-Kai Watch Blasters: Red Cat Corp and White Dog Squad	3DS					Nintendo		
2018 (JP)	Your Four Knight Princesses Training Story	NS, PS4, PSV					Nippon Ichi Software		
2018	Ys Origin	XBO		Action RPG			DotEmu		
2018	Ys VIII: Lacrimosa of Dana	WIN, NS		Action RPG			NIS America		
2018	Ys: Memories of Celceta	WIN		Action RPG			Xseed Games		
2019 (JP)	Action Taimanin	WIN, DROID, IOS	Original	Action RPG	Fantasy	Gremory Games, Lilith	Gremory Games, Infini-Brain inc.	JP	
2019	The Alliance Alive HD Remastered	NS, PS4					NIS America		
2019	Alvastia Chronicles	WIN, XBO					Kemco		
2019	Anthem	WIN, PS4, XBO		Action RPG			Electronic Arts		
2019 (CN)	Arknights	iOS, DROID		Tactical RPG			Hypergryph		
2019	Asdivine Dios	WIN, XBO					Kemco		
2019	Asdivine Hearts 2	PS4, PSV					Kemco		
2019	Asdivine Menace	XBO					Kemco		
2019 (WW)	Asgard's Wrath	Quest	Original	Action RPG	Norse mythology	Sanzaru Games	Oculus Studios	US	
2019 (WW)	Atelier Lulua: The Scion of Arland	WIN, NS, PS4	Original	Turn-based, JRPG	Fantasy	Gust	Koei Tecmo	JP	
2019 (WW)	Atelier Ryza: Ever Darkness & the Secret Hideout	WIN, NS, PS4	Original	Turn-based, JRPG	Fantasy	Gust	Koei Tecmo	JP	
2019 (JP)	Azur Lane: Crosswave	PS4		Action RPG			Idea Factory		
2019	Baldur's Gate II: Enhanced Edition	NS, PS4, XBO					Skybound Games		
2019	Baldur's Gate: Enhanced Edition	NS, PS4, XBO					Skybound Games		
2019	Baldur's Gate: Siege of Dragonspear	NS, PS4, XBO					Skybound Games		
2019	Bonds of the Skies	WIN, NS, PS4					Kemco		
2019	Borderlands 3	Stadia		Action RPG			2K Games		
2019	Breath of Fire	NS							
2019	Breath of Fire II	NS							
2019	The Caligula Effect: Overdose	WIN, NS, PS4					NIS America		
2019	Caravan Stories	PS4		MMORPG			Aiming		
2019 (WW)	Children of Morta	NS, OSX, PS4, XBO, WIN	Original	Action RPG	Fantasy	Dead Mage	11 Bit Studios	IR	
2019	Chocobo's Mystery Dungeon Every Buddy!	NS, PS4		Roguelike			Square Enix		
2019 (WW)	Code Vein	WIN, PS4, XBO	Original	Action RPG	Post-apocalyptic	Bandai Namco Entertainment		JP	
2019	Collection of Mana	NS		Action RPG			Square Enix		
2019	Crystalis	NS		Action RPG					
2019	Crystar	WIN, PS4		Action RPG			Spike Chunsoft		
2019	Cube World	WIN		Action RPG			Picroma		
2019	Darksiders Genesis	WIN, Stadia					THQ Nordic		
2019	Darksiders II: Deathinitive Edition	NS		Action RPG			THQ Nordic		
2019	Dauntless	WIN, PS4, XBO		Action RPG			Epic Games		
2019 (WW)	Death end re;Quest	PS4	Original	Turn-based, JRPG	Sci-fi	Compile Heart, Idea Factory	Idea Factory	JP	
2019 (WW)	Decay of Logos	WIN, PS4, XBO, NS	Original	Action RPG	Fantasy	Amplify Creations	Rising Star Games	PT	
2019	Deltarune: Chapter 1	NS, PS4					Toby Fox		
2019	Destiny 2: Shadowkeep	WIN, PS4, XBO		Action RPG			Bungie		
2019 (WW)	Destiny Connect: Tick-Tock Travelers	PS4, NS	Original	Turn-based	Fantasy	Nippon Ichi Software	NIS America	JP	
2019	Digimon Story Cyber Sleuth: Complete Edition	WIN, NS					Bandai Namco Entertainment		
2019 (WW)	Disco Elysium	WIN	Original		Modern; Alternate history	ZA/UM		EE	
2019	Disgaea 4 Complete+	NS, PS4		Tactical RPG			NIS America		
2019	Divinity: Original Sin II	NS					Bandai Namco Entertainment		
2019 (WW)	Doraemon Story of Seasons	WIN, NS					Bandai Namco Entertainment		
2019	Dragon Marked For Death	NS					Inti Creates		
2019	Dragon Quest	NS					Square Enix		
2019	Dragon Quest Builders 2	NS, PS4, WIN		Action RPG			Square Enix		
2019	Dragon Quest II	NS					Square Enix		
2019	Dragon Quest III	NS					Square Enix		
2019	Dragon Quest XI S	NS					Nintendo		
2019 (WW)	Dragon Star Varnir	PS4, WIN	Original	Turn-based, JRPG	Fantasy	Compile Heart	Idea Factory	JP	
2019	Dragon's Dogma: Dark Arisen	NS		Action RPG			Capcom		
2019	Dusk Diver	NS, PS4		Action RPG			PQube		
2019 (WW)	Etrian Odyssey Nexus	3DS	Original	Dungeon crawl	Fantasy	Atlus		JP	
2019	EverQuest: Torment of Velious	WIN		MMORPG			Daybreak Games		
2019	Final Fantasy IX	NS, XBO					Square Enix		
2019	Final Fantasy VII	NS, XBO					Square Enix		
2019	Final Fantasy VIII Remastered	WIN, NS, PS4, XBO					Square Enix		
2019	Final Fantasy X/X-2 HD Remaster	NS, XBO					Square Enix		
2019	Final Fantasy XII: The Zodiac Age	NS, XBO					Square Enix		
2019	Final Fantasy XIV: Shadowbringers	WIN, PS4		MMORPG			Square Enix		
2019	Final Fantasy XV	Stadia		Action RPG			Square Enix		
2019 (JP)	Fire Emblem: Shadow Dragon and the Blade of Light	NS		Tactical RPG					
2019 (WW)	Fire Emblem: Three Houses	NS	Original	Tactical RPG	Fantasy	Intelligent Systems, Koei Tecmo	Nintendo	JP	
2019	Frane: Dragons' Odyssey	XBO		Action RPG			Kemco		
2019	God Eater 3	NS, PS4, WIN		Action RPG			Bandai Namco Entertainment		
2019	Grandia HD Collection	NS					GungHo Online Entertainment		
2019	Grandia HD Remaster	WIN					GungHo Online Entertainment		
2019 (WW)	GreedFall	WIN, PS4, XBO	Original	Action RPG	Fantasy	Spiders	Focus Home Interactive	FR	
2019	Guildlings	iOS, OSX, tvOS					Sirvo Studios		
2019	Hyper Light Drifter	iOS		Action RPG			Abylight Studios		
2019	Icewind Dale: Enhanced Edition	NS, PS4, XBO					Skybound Games		
2019	Illusion of L'Phalcia	PS4					Kemco		
2019 (WW)	Indivisible	WIN, PS4, XBO	Original	Action RPG	Fantasy	Lab Zero Games	505 Games	US	
2019	Interrogation	WIN, OSX, LIN					Mixtvision		
2019 (WW)	Kingdom Hearts III	PS4, XBO	Original	Action RPG	Crossover	Square Enix		JP	
2019	The Legend of Heroes: Trails of Cold Steel	PS4					Xseed Games		
2019	The Legend of Heroes: Trails of Cold Steel II	PS4					Xseed Games		
2019	The Legend of Heroes: Trails of Cold Steel III	PS4					Xseed Games		
2019 (WW)	Legrand Legacy: Tale of the Fatebounds	PS4, XBO, NS	Port	Turn-based, JRPG	Fantasy	SEMISOFT	Another Indie	ID	
2019	Little Town Hero	NS					Game Freak		
2019	Mario & Luigi: Bowser's Inside Story + Bowser Jr.'s Journey	3DS					Nintendo		
2019	Marvel Ultimate Alliance 3: The Black Order	NS		Action RPG			Nintendo		
2019 (WW)	Monster Hunter World: Iceborne	PS4, XBO, WIN	Original	Action RPG	Fantasy	Capcom		JP	
2019 (JP)	Moon: Remix RPG Adventure	NS					Onion Games		
2019	Nelke & the Legendary Alchemists: Ateliers of the New World	WIN, NS, PS4					Koei Tecmo		
2019	Neverwinter Nights: Enhanced Edition	NS, PS4, XBO					Skybound Games		
2019	Ni no Kuni: Wrath of the White Witch	NS					Bandai Namco Entertainment		
2019	Ni no Kuni: Wrath of the White Witch Remastered	WIN, PS4					Bandai Namco Entertainment		
2019 (WW)	Octopath Traveler	WIN	Port	Turn-based, JRPG	Fantasy	Square Enix, Acquire	Square Enix	JP	
2019	Omega Labyrinth Life	WIN, NS, PS4		Dungeon crawl			D3Publisher		
2019	Omensight	XBO		Action RPG			Spearhead Games		
2019	Oninaki	WIN, NS, PS4					Square Enix		
2019	Operencia: The Stolen Sun	WIN, XBO					Zen Studios		
2019	The Outer Worlds	WIN, PS4, XBO					Private Division		
2019	Outward	WIN, PS4, XBO		Action RPG			Deep Silver		
2019 (WW)	Paranoia: Happiness is Mandatory	WIN	Original		Sci-fi	Cyanide Studio, Black Shamrock	Bigben Interactive	FR	
2019 (WW)	Persona Q2: New Cinema Labyrinth	3DS	Original	Dungeon crawl	Urban fantasy	Atlus		JP	
2019	Pillars of Eternity: Complete Edition	NS					Versus Evil		
2019	Planescape: Torment: Enhanced Edition	NS, PS4, XBO					Skybound Games		
2019	Pokémon Masters	iOS, DROID					DeNA		
2019 (WW)	Pokémon Sword and Shield	NS	Original	Monster tamer	Fantasy	Game Freak	The Pokémon Company, Nintendo	JP	
2019 (CN)	Punishing: Gray Raven	iOS, DROID		Action RPG			Kuro Games		
2019 (WW)	Romancing SaGa 3	WIN, NS, PS4, PSV, XBO, iOS, DROID	Port	Turn-based, Sandbox	Fantasy	Square	Square Enix	JP	
2019 (WW)	SaGa: Scarlet Grace - Ambitions	PS4, NS, WIN, DROID, iOS	Port	Turn-based, Sandbox	Fantasy	Square Enix, Studio Reel	Square Enix	JP	
2019	SaGa: Scarlet Grace – Ambitions	WIN, NS, PS4, iOS, DROID					Square Enix		
2019 (JP)	Sakura Wars	PS4		Action RPG			Sega		
2019	SD Gundam G Generation Cross Rays	WIN		Tactical RPG			Bandai Namco Entertainment		
2019	Sephirothic Stories	XBO					Kemco		
2019 (WW)	Star Ocean: First Departure R	NS, PS4	Port	Action RPG, Roguelike	Science fantasy	Tose	Square Enix	JP	
2019	SteamWorld Quest: Hand of Gilgamech	NS							
2019	Sunless Skies	WIN, OSX, LIN					Failbetter Games		
2019	Super Neptunia RPG	NS, PS4, WIN					Idea Factory		
2019 (JP)	Super Robot Wars T	NS, PS4		Tactical RPG			Bandai Namco Entertainment		
2019	The Surge 2	WIN, PS4, XBO		Action RPG			Focus Home Interactive		
2019	Sword Art Online: Fatal Bullet Complete Edition	NS		Action RPG			Bandai Namco Entertainment		
2019	Table of Tales: The Crooked Crown	PSVR					Tin Man Games		
2019	Tales of Vesperia: Definitive Edition	WIN, NS, PS4, XBO					Bandai Namco Entertainment		
2019	Tom Clancy's The Division 2	WIN, PS4, XBO		Action RPG			Ubisoft		
2019	Touhou Shoujo: Tale of Beautiful Memories	WIN		Action RPG			DLsite		
2019	Utawarerumono: Zan	PS4		Action RPG			NIS America		
2019	Vampyr	NS		Action RPG			Focus Home Interactive		
2019	Virgo Versus the Zodiac	OSX, WIN					Degica Games		
2019 (JP)	War of the Visions: Final Fantasy Brave Exvius	iOS, DROID		Tactical RPG			Square Enix		
2019	Warhammer: Chaosbane	WIN, PS4, XBO					Bigben Interactive		
2019	Warsaw	WIN, NS, PS4, XBO		Action RPG			Pixelated Milk		
2019	Winds of Change	WIN					Crunching Koalas		
2019	The Witcher 3: Wild Hunt Complete Edition	NS		Action RPG			Warner Bros. Interactive Entertainment		
2019	World of Warcraft Classic	WIN, OSX					Blizzard Entertainment		
2019	YIIK: A Postmodern RPG	WIN, OSX, NS, PS4, PSV					Ysbryd Games		
2019 (JP)	Yo-kai Watch 4	NS					Level-5		
2019 (JP)	Ys IX: Monstrum Nox	PS4					Nihon Falcom		
2019	Zanki Zero: Last Beginning	WIN, PS4		Dungeon crawl			Spike Chunsoft		
2019	Zelda II: The Adventure of Link	NS		Action RPG					
