= Semisoft =

Semisoft or semi-soft may refer to:

- Semisoft sign, a letter in Cyrillic script
- Semi-soft, a style of cheese
- Semisoft, developer of the video game Legrand Legacy
