= Discounty =

2025 video game

- Developer: Crinkle Cut Games
- Publishers: PQube; Snapbreak (iOS, Android)
- Platforms: Windows; Nintendo Switch; PlayStation 4; PlayStation 5; Xbox One; Xbox Series X/S; iOS; Android
- Release: Nintendo Switch; 20 August 2025; Windows, PS4, PS5, Xbox; 21 August 2025; iOS, Android; 18 August 2026
- Genres: Simulation, life sim
- Mode: Single-player

Discounty is a 2025 supermarket management simulation video game developed by Danish studio Crinkle Cut Games and published by PQube. The player manages a franchise supermarket in the fictional harbour town of Blomkest. It was released in August 2025 for Windows, Nintendo Switch, PlayStation 4, PlayStation 5, Xbox One and Xbox Series X/S, with iOS and Android versions following on 18 August 2026.

== Gameplay ==
Discounty combines shop management with life simulation elements. The player arrives in Blomkest at the invitation of their aunt Tellar, who has opened a branch of the Discounty supermarket chain and appoints them its sole employee.

Each day, the player orders deliveries, stocks and arranges shelves, keeps the store clean and operates the checkout, totalling each customer's purchases on a calculator. The parent Discounty Corporation sets performance targets that reward stock variety and efficiency, and meeting them unlocks upgrades such as a barcode scanner alongside new product lines.

The store can be expanded and its layout freely rearranged, and the player can eventually hire an employee. Outside opening hours, the player can explore Blomkest, complete quests for its residents and negotiate with merchants who supply goods unavailable through regular orders. The story follows the townspeople's response as the supermarket grows and the chain's presence begins to change the town. The base campaign runs approximately 40 in-game days across three chapters.

== Development and release ==
Discounty is the debut game of Crinkle Cut Games, a small Danish studio. The game's release date was announced in June 2025 during a Wholesome Games Presents showcase. It was published by PQube and released on 20 August 2025 for Nintendo Switch and on 21 August 2025 for Windows, PlayStation 4, PlayStation 5, Xbox One and Xbox Series X/S.

On 6 June 2026, Crinkle Cut Games released "People or Profit?", a free update set after the original ending, for Windows, with console versions following the next month. The new chapter places the player in charge of the store and adds a branching questline with three possible endings and three new characters.

Versions for iOS and Android, published by Snapbreak, launched on 18 August 2026 with the update included.

== Reception ==
Reception

Aggregate scores
Aggregator	Score
Metacritic	PC: 79/100; NS: 74/100; PS5: 74/100; XSXS: 76/100
OpenCritic	76/100

Review scores
Publication	Score
Nintendo Life	7/10
Push Square	7/10
Nintendo World Report	7/10
Gamereactor	8/10

Discounty received generally positive reviews. On the review aggregator OpenCritic, 74% of 43 critics recommended the game, with an average score of 76/100. On Metacritic, the game holds scores of 79/100 for Windows, 76/100 for Xbox Series X/S and 74/100 for both the Nintendo Switch and PlayStation 5 versions.

Ken Talbot of Nintendo Life called Discounty "a solid addition to the Switch's healthy stable of cosy sims". He praised its relaxing take on retail work, but criticised the shallow customer storylines and fiddly till interface. John Hansen of Push Square similarly enjoyed managing and upgrading the shop, although he found the calculator awkward to use with a thumbstick. He also felt that the community missions had little lasting effect.

Allyson Cygan of Nintendo World Report praised the gameplay and presentation, but felt the story ended too quickly and did not fully develop its commentary on corporate growth. She described the result as falling between a shop simulation and an indie game with a message. Magnus Groth-Andersen of Gamereactor rated it 8/10. He praised the cast and considered the game's limited scope one of its strengths, though he felt its visual identity could have been more distinctive.
