= Marie & Gali =

Japanese anime series

マリー＆ガリー (Marī & Garī)
- Genre: Comedy
- Created by: Izumi Todo
- Anime television series
- Directed by: Yukio Kaizawa; Kōhei Kureta
- Produced by: Hiromasa Kondo
- Written by: Takashi Yamada
- Music by: Yuji Yoshino
- Studio: Toei Animation
- Original network: NHK Educational TV
- Original run: March 31, 2009 – March 23, 2010
- Episodes: 40
- Anime television series

Marie & Gali ver.2.0
- Directed by: Yukio Kaizawa; Kōhei Kureta
- Produced by: Hiromasa Kondo
- Written by: Takashi Yamada
- Music by: Yuji Yoshino
- Studio: Toei Animation
- Original network: NHK Educational TV
- Original run: March 30, 2010 – March 22, 2011
- Episodes: 30
- Video game

Marie & Gali: Let's Science
- Developer: DORASU
- Genre: Puzzle
- Platform: Nintendo DS
- Released: April 15, 2010

Marie & Gali (マリー＆ガリー) is a Japanese anime created by Izumi Todo. It aired on NHK from March 30, 2009, until March 22, 2011, for a total of 70 episodes of five minutes each. It was the first anime (in over three decades) produced by Toei Animation to be broadcast on the NHK-E educational channel since 1978's Captain Future. A sequel, Marie & Gali ver.2.0 aired from March 30, 2010, until March 22, 2011.

== Plot ==
The anime follows Marika, a student who loves the gothic lolita aesthetic, but falls asleep as soon as someone starts talking about science. One day, after a nap on the train, she discovers that her stuffed animal, Pet, is able to move and ends up in the strange city of Galihabara. Here, Marika meets the astronomer Galileo and other famous scientists, and with a bit of their help, starts to appreciate science little by little.

== Characters ==
Marika (マリカ, Marika)
Voiced by: Chiemi Chiba
Marie is a young student who dresses in gothic lolita style. She does not like science, but once she arrives in Galihabara, she begins to appreciate it day by day. She was born on December 12th.
Pet (ペット, Petto)
The hand-sewn plush by Marika. When Marie arrives in Galihabara, Pet begins to move, but cannot speak due to Pet lacking a mouth. Despite having a bow on his head, he is a boy.
Norika (ノリカ, Norika)
Voiced by: Marina Inoue
Appears in the second season and is an elementary school girl who dresses in Sweet Lolita style. She hates science and is very childish.
Kuma (クマ, Kuma)
Appears in the second season and is the plush of Norika. She is a female, and, when she gets angry, becomes gigantic.
Galileo (ガリレオ, Garireo)
Voiced by: Chō
Nicknamed "Gali", he is a supporter of Copernican theory and the heliocentric system. He works at the observatory and was born on February 15th.
Madame Curie (キュリー夫人, Kyurī fujin)
Voiced by: Masako Nozawa
A beautiful and intelligent lady, runs a bar and a pension in Galihabara.
Newton (ニュートン, Nyūton)
Voiced by: Tomoyasu Sakata
A tall, handsome man selling apples. His beauty makes him narcissistic and he attracts many women. He hates insects.
Hertz (ヘルツ, Herutsu)
Voiced by: Jūrōta Kosugi
He is a robust man who has a ramen shop.
Fleming (フレミング, Furemingu)
Voiced by: Masami Kikuchi
During the day he works part-time at Edison's appliance store, while at night he is a DJ.
Archimedes (アルキメデス, Arukimedesu)
Voiced by: Tomomichi Nishimura
He runs the "Syracuse" wind temple in the Greek quarter. When he finds something, he has a habit of screaming "Eureka!"
Da Vinci (ダ・ヴィンチ, Da Vinchi)
Voiced by: Tanonaka Isamu and Takeshi Aono (Marie & Gali ver2.0)
He is a grandfather with a beard and rival of Galileo.
Darwin (ダーウィン, Dāuin)
Voiced by: Yoshinori Fujita
Developer of the theory of evolution, he is a robot.
Edison (エジソン, Ejison)
Voiced by: Yukiko Tamako
He obtained several patents at a young age and is a stingy man, owner of the Galihabara electronics store. He is in love with Norika.
Gagarin (ガガーリン, Gagārin)
Voiced by: Takeshi Aono
He appears in the second season and is an astronaut.

== Media ==
=== Anime ===
==== Episodes ====
===== Season 1 =====
The theme of the first season is Galihabara! (ガリハバラ！), sung by Swing Mates K (スウィング・メイツK), while that of the second season is Kagakuru! Miracle! (カガクル！ミラクル！, Kagakuru! Mirakuru!), Sung by Chiba Chiemi and Inoue Marina (VAs of Marika and Norika).

| No. | Title | Directed by | Written by | Original air date |
|---|---|---|---|---|
| 0 | "Pilot episode" Transliteration: "Pairotto-ban" (Japanese: パイロット版) | Rie Matsumoto | Takashi Yamada | November 8, 2008 |
| 1 | "Marika in a strange city" Transliteration: "Fushigina Machi no Marika" (Japanese: ふしぎな街のマリカ) | Yukio Kaizawa | Takashi Yamada | March 31, 2009 |
| 2 | "The mysterious city of Galihabara"; Transliteration: "Fushigina Machi Garihabara" (Japanese: ふしぎな街 ガリハバラ) | Yukio Kaizawa | Takashi Yamada | April 7, 2009 |
| 3 | "Love and apple's universal charm!" Transliteration: "Ai to Ringo no Ban'yū Miryoku!" (Japanese: 愛とリンゴの万有魅力!) | Kohei Kureta | Mio Inoue | April 14, 2009 |
| 4 | "The secret of ramen and interference" Transliteration: "Rāmen to Kanshō no Himitsu" (ラーメンと干渉のひみつ) | Kohei Kureta | Yoichi Takahashi | April 21, 2009 |
| 5 | "Electromagnetic force! Sing! Love coil" Transliteration: "Denji-ryoku! Utae! Rabu Koiru" (Japanese: 電磁力！歌え！ラブコイル) | Yutaka Tsuchida | Takashi Yamada | April 28, 2009 |
| 6 | "We found an Oden shop" Transliteration: "Ga Oden ni Hakken Seri" (Japanese: 我 おでんに発見せり) | Yutaka Tsuchida | Mio Inoue | May 5, 2009 |
| 7 | "Create It, Destroy It! Da Vinci's Great Inventions"; Transliteration: "Tsukutte Kowashite! Dabinchi Dai Hatsumei" (Japanese: 作ってこわして！ダビンチ大発明) | Kohei Kureta | Yoichi Takahashi | May 12, 2009 |
| 8 | "Welcome to the Radium hot springs" Transliteration: "Rajiumu Onsen ni Yōkoso" (Japanese: ラジウム温泉にようこそ) | Kohei Kureta | Takashi Yamada | May 19, 2009 |
| 9 | "The secret of the rainbow is Do Re Mi Fa So?"; Transliteration: "Niji no Himitsu wa Do Re Mi Fa So?" (Japanese: 虹のひみつはドレミファソ？) | Aya Komaki | Mio Inoue | May 26, 2009 |
| 10 | "Space is a big Kaleidoscope?"; Transliteration: "Uchū wa Ōkina Mangekyō?" (Japanese: 宇宙は大きな万華鏡？) | Kohei Kureta | Yoichi Takahashi | June 9, 2009 |
| 11 | "Marika finally wakes up" Transliteration: "Marika Tsui ni Mezameru?" (Japanese: マリカついに目覚める？) | Aya Komaki | Takashi Yamada | June 16, 2009 |
| 12 | "Beware of heat" Transliteration: "Oatsui no ni Goyōshin" (Japanese: お熱いのにご用心) | Kohei Kureta | Mio Inoue | June 23, 2009 |
| 13 | "Rub it, scrub it, ignite it" Transliteration: "Kosutte Migaite Hi o Tsukete" (Japanese: こすってみがいて火をつけて) | Yutaka Tsuchida | Yoichi Takahashi | June 30, 2009 |
| 14 | "Galihabara Storm Fear"; Transliteration: "Gariba Arashi no Kyōfu" (Japanese: ガリバ嵐の恐怖) | Aya Komaki | Yumi Nakamura | July 7, 2009 |
| 15 | "This is FM Galihabara"; Transliteration: "Kochira FM Garihabara" (Japanese: こちらFMガリハバラ) | Yutaka Tsuchida | Takashi Yamada | July 14, 2009 |
| 16 | "Hertz's endless noodle training" Transliteration: "Hateshinaki Herutsu no Men Shugyō" (Japanese: 果てしなきヘルツの麺修行) | Aya Komaki | Yoichi Takahashi | July 21, 2009 |
| 17 | "Catch the Robo-pet!"; Transliteration: "Robo-petto o Tsukamete!" (Japanese: ロボペットをつかまえて！) | Kohei Kureta | Mio Inoue | August 11, 2009 |
| 18 | "Why does the Whimsical Bridge disappear?" Transliteration: "Kimagure-bashi wa naze Kieru?" (Japanese: 気まぐれ橋はなぜ消える？) | Yutaka Tsuchida | Yumi Nakamura | August 25, 2009 |
| 19 | "Hello is a wonderful word" Transliteration: "Harō wa Sutekina Kotoba" (Japanese: ハローはすてきな言葉) | Kohei Kureta | Takashi Yamada | September 1, 2009 |
| 20 | "Travelling through space by train" Transliteration: "Densha ni Notte Uchū Ryokō" (Japanese: 電車に乗って宇宙旅行) | Yutaka Tsuchida | Yoichi Takahashi | September 8, 2009 |
| 21 | "Pet's close call" Transliteration: "Petto Kiki Ippatsu" (Japanese: ペット危機一髪) | Aya Komaki | Yumi Nakamura | September 15, 2009 |
| 22 | "A great invention? The Edison toaster" Transliteration: "Dai Hatsumei? Ejison Tōsutā" (Japanese: 大発明？エジソントースター) | Kohei Kureta | Yoichi Takahashi | September 22, 2009 |
| 23 | "Galiba pharmacy?" Transliteration: "Gariba Yakkyoku?" (Japanese: ガリバ薬局？) | Aya Komaki | Yumi Nakamura | October 6, 2009 |
| 24 | "Turtle rescue project" Transliteration: "Kame Kyūsai Purojekuto" (Japanese: カメ救済プロジェクト) | Kohei Kureta | Takashi Yamada | October 13, 2009 |
| 25 | "Birthday All Alone"; Transliteration: "Hitori Bocchi no Tanjōbi" (Japanese: 一人ぼっちの誕生日) | Yutaka Tsuchida | Yoichi Takahashi | October 20, 2009 |
| 26 | "Big Catch! Galiba angling tournament" Transliteration: "Tairyō! Gariba-zuri Takai" (Japanese: 大漁！ガリバ釣り大会) | Aya Komaki | Mio Inoue | November 3, 2009 |
| 27 | "Why does lightning occur?" Transliteration: "Kaminari Denki wa Naze Okoru?" (Japanese: 雷電気はなぜおこる？) | Yutaka Tsuchida | Takashi Yamada | November 10, 2009 |
| 28 | "Galiba-Style Kick the Can!?"; Transliteration: "Gariba-ryū Kankeri!?" (Japanese: ガリバ流缶けり!?) | Aya Komaki | Yumi Nakamura | November 17, 2009 |
| 29 | "Colourful! Robot battle" Transliteration: "Karafuru! Robotto Taisen" (Japanese: カラフル！ロボット大戦) | Kohei Kureta | Yoichi Takahashi | December 1, 2009 |
| 30 | "Marika helps out" Transliteration: "Marika no Otetsudai" (Japanese: マリカのお手伝い) | Yutaka Tsuchida | Mio Inoue | December 8, 2009 |
| 31 | "Gali is a nice person?" Transliteration: "Garī-tte Erai Hito?" (Japanese: ガリーって偉い人？) | Yutaka Tsuchida | Takashi Yamada | December 15, 2009 |
| 32 | "Pie even though it's pizza" Transliteration: "Piza nano ni Pai" (Japanese: ピザなのにパイ) | Directed by : Kohei Kureta; Storyboarded by : Hiroyuki Kakudō | Yumi Nakamura | December 22, 2009 |
| 33 | "Ophiuchus woman" Transliteration: "Hebitsukaiza no On'na" (Japanese: へびつかい座の女) | Aya Komaki | Mio Inoue | January 5, 2010 |
| 34 | "Fear! Invitation from Bruno"; Transliteration: "Kyōfu! Burūno kara no Jōtaijō" (Japanese: 恐怖！ブルーノからの招待状) | Kohei Kureta | Yoichi Takahashi | January 12, 2010 |
| 35 | "Shock! Shock! I hate you" Transliteration: "Bachi~tsu! Bacchi~tsu! Dai Kirai" (Japanese: バチッ！バチッ！大嫌い) | Aya Komaki | Yumi Nakamura | January 19, 2010 |
| 36 | "Chitty Chitty! Galiba Car Racing"; Transliteration: "Chikichiki! Gariba Kā Rēsu" (Japanese: チキチキ！ガリバカーレース) | Kohei Kureta | Yoichi Takahashi | February 2, 2010 |
| 37 | "The moon is falling!" Transliteration: "Tsuki wa Ochite Iru!?" (Japanese: 月は落ちている!?) | Yutaka Tsuchida | Mio Inoue | February 9, 2010 |
| 38 | "Galileo gets arrested!?" Transliteration: "Garireo, Taiho sa Reru!?" (Japanese: ガリレオ、逮捕される!?) | Yutaka Tsuchida | Takashi Yamada | February 16, 2010 |
| 39 | "And yet, the Earth is still moving!" Transliteration: "Soredemo Chikyū wa Ugoite Iru!" (Japanese: それでも地球は動いている！) | Yukio Kaizawa | Takashi Yamada | March 16, 2010 |
| 40 | "This is the last round" Transliteration: "Saishūkai nan desu kedo" (Japanese: 最終回なんですけど) | Yukio Kaizawa | Takashi Yamada | March 23, 2010 |

===== Ver 2.0 =====
| No. | Title | Directed by | Written by | Original release date |
|---|---|---|---|---|
| 1 | "Marika is Back" "Kattekita Marika" (Japanese: 帰ってきたマリカ) | Yukio Kaizawa | Takashi Yamada | March 30, 2010 |
| 2 | "Why are Soap Bubbles Round?" "Dōshite Marui no Shabon Tama" (Japanese: どうして丸いのシャボン玉) | Yukio Kaizawa | Takashi Yamada | April 6, 2010 |
| 3 | "Why is it Upside Down? The Secret of Mirrors" "Dōshite Sakasa ma? Kagami no Himitsu" (Japanese: どうしてさかさま？鏡の秘密) | Masako Orimoto | Mio Inoue | April 13, 2010 |
| 4 | "Let's Bake Fluffy Bread!" "Fukkusu Pan o Yakou!" (Japanese: ふっくらパンを焼こう！) | Directed by : Hideki Hiroshima; Storyboarded by : Noriyo Sasaki | Yoichi Takahashi | April 20, 2010 |
| 5 | "Meditating an Argument, Is Marika Soapy?" "Kenna no Chūsai Marika wa Sekken?" (Japanese: けんかの仲裁マリカはせっけん？) | Masako Orimoto | Isao Murayama | April 27, 2010 |
| 6 | "Marika and Norika's Snoring Busters" "Marika to Norika no Ibiki Basutāzu!" (Japanese: マリカとノリカのイビキバスターズ！) | Directed by : Hideki Hiroshima; Storyboarded by : Hiroyuki Kakudo | Unknown | May 4, 2010 |
| 7 | "Marika is a Great Golfer!?" "Marika wa Mei Gorufā!?" (Japanese: マリカは名ゴルファー！？) | Yukio Kaizawa | Yoichi Takahashi | May 18, 2010 |
| 8 | "Explore the Inside of Your Body with Micromachines!" "Maikuro Mashin de Tainai Tenken!" (Japanese: マイクロマシンで体内探検！) | Aya Komaki | Yoichi Takahashi | May 25, 2010 |
| 9 | "Galiba's Method!? Apple's Diet!" "Gariba-shiki!? Ringo-chan Dietto!" (Japanese: ガリバ式！？リンゴちゃんダイエット！) | Yukio Kaizawa | Mutsumi Ito | June 1, 2010 |
| 10 | "A Bear that Lived for 100 million Years" "Ichi Oku-nen Ikita Kuma" (Japanese: 一億年生きたクマ) | Aya Komaki | Jin Tanaka | June 8, 2010 |
| 11 | "In Search of Lost Time" "Ushi Nawareta Toki o Motomete" (Japanese: 失われた時を求めて) | Yutaka Tsuchida | Yoichi Takahashi | June 15, 2010 |
| 12 | "The Story of a White Night Dream" "Byakuya no Yume no Monogatari" (Japanese: 白夜の夢の物語) | Kohei Kureta | Takashi Yamada | July 6, 2010 |
| 13 | "Galiba's Pirates! Aim for the Hidden Treasure" "Gariba no Kaizoku! Kakusareta Takara o Nerae" (Japanese: ガリバの海賊！隠された宝をねらえ) | Kohei Kureta | Mutsumi Ito | July 27, 2010 |
| 14 | "Cool Down the Scorching Hot Galiba!" "Shakunetsu no Gariba o Hiyase!" (Japanese: 灼熱のガリバを冷やせ！) | Yukio Kaizawa | Mio Inoue | August 3, 2010 |
| 15 | "The Birth of Galiba Future Museum" "Tanjō! Gariba Mirai Ken" (Japanese: 誕生！ガリバ未来館) | Yukio Kaizawa | Mio Inoue | August 24, 2010 |
| 16 | "I Want to Convey my Passionate Heart!" "Atsui Hāto o Tsutaetai" (Japanese: 熱いハートを伝えたい！) | Aya Komaki | Mutsumi Ito | August 31, 2010 |
| 17 | "Welcome to Galiba Amusement Park" "Gariba Yuenichi e Yōkoso" (Japanese: ガリバ遊園地へようこそ) | Directed by : Aya Komaki; Storyboarded by : Masatoshi Chioka | Mutsumi Ito | September 7, 2010 |
| 18 | "Science Detectives! Loli Loli Sisters" "Kazaku Tantei! Rorirori Shisutāzu" (Japanese: 科学探偵！ロリロリシスターズ) | Yukio Kaizawa | Jin Tanaka | October 5, 2010 |
| 19 | "Phantom Thief's Galiba's Challenge" "Kaitō Gariba no Chōsen-jō" (Japanese: 怪盗ガリバの挑戦状) | Yutaka Tsuchida | Jin Tanaka | October 12, 2010 |
| 20 | "The End of Phantom Thief Galiba" "Kaitō Gariba no Saigo" (Japanese: 怪盗ガリバの最後) | Directed by : Hideki Hiroshima; Storyboarded by : Masako Orimoto | Jin Tanaka | October 19, 2010 |
| 21 | "The Secret of Star Shapes" "Hoshi no Katachi no Himitsu" (Japanese: 星の形のひみつ) | Directed by : Hideki Hiroshima; Storyboarded by : Noriyo Sasaki | Isao Murayama | November 2, 2010 |
| 22 | "Challenge! Science Cooking" "Chōsen Saisensu Kukkingu" (Japanese: 挑戦！サイエンスクッキング) | Yutaka Tsuchida | Mio Inoue | November 9, 2010 |
| 23 | "Fly into the Sky!" "Ōzora ni Habatake!" (Japanese: 大空にはばたけ！) | Kohei Kureta | Isao Murayama | November 16, 2010 |
| 24 | "Sky Adventurers" "Tenkū no Bōkenshatachi" (Japanese: 天空の冒険者たち) | Yukio Kaizawa | Isao Murayama | December 7, 2010 |
| 25 | "Dispatch! Loli Loli Fire Brigade" "Shutsudō! Rorirori Shōbō Tai" (Japanese: 出動！ロリロリ消防隊) | Directed by : Hideki Hiroshima; Storyboarded by : Masako Orimoto | Yoichi Takahashi | January 4, 2011 |
| 26 | "Pet Bear Evolution" "Petto･Kuma Shinka-ron" (Japanese: ペット･クマ進化論) | Directed by : Hideki Hiroshima; Storyboarded by : Hiroyuki Kakudo | Jin Tanaka | January 11, 2011 |
| 27 | "Very Popular! Loli Loli DJ Sisters" "Daininki! Rorori DJ Shisutāzu" (Japanese: 大人気！ロリロリDJシスターズ) | Yutaka Tsuchida | Takashi Yamada | February 1, 2011 |
| 28 | "A Huge Eruption! Calm Norika's Anger!" "Dai Funka! Norika no Ikari o Shizumero" (Japanese: 大噴火！ノリカの怒りをしずめろ！) | Kohei Kureta | Isao Murayama | March 1, 2011 |
| 29 | "Space Challenger" "Uchū e no Chōsen-sha" (Japanese: 宇宙への挑戦者) | Yukio Kaizawa | Mio Inoue | March 8, 2011 |
| 30 | "Space Travel Together" "Minna de Uchū Ryokō" (Japanese: みんなで宇宙旅行) | Kohei Kureta | Takashi Yamada | March 22, 2011 |

=== Video games ===
A video game, Marie & Gali: Let's Science (マリー＆ガリーのLet'sさいえんす) was developed by DORASU for the Nintendo DS and released in Japan on April 15, 2010.
