= All Possible Futures =

All Possible Futures may refer to:

- All Possible Futures, developer of The Plucky Squire video game
- All Possible Futures, a music album by Australian electronic music ensemble Miami Horror
