= Kokuchou =

Kokuchou may refer to the following:

- "Kokuchou: 13 Japanese Birds Pt. 8", a song by Masami Akita
- Psychedelica of the Black Butterfly, a Japanese otome game
- "Kokuchō no Psychedelica", a song performed by Eiko Shimamiya
- Last Escort: Shinya no Kokuchou Monogatari, a Japanese otome game
