= City of Brass =

City of Brass may refer to:

- "The City of Brass" (One Thousand and One Nights), one of the stories of the One Thousand and One Nights (Arabian Nights)
- "City of Brass", a 1909 poem by Rudyard Kipling
- City of Brass (Dungeons & Dragons), a fictional location in the game Dungeons & Dragons.
- The City of Brass (novel), a 2017 novel by S. A. Chakraborty
- City of Brass (video game), a 2017 video game
