= 7'scarlet =

2016 video game

- Developers: Otomate; Toybox Inc.
- Publishers: JP: Idea Factory; NA/EU: Aksys Games
- Director: Tomio Kanazawa
- Artist: Chinatsu Kurahana
- Writer: Tomio Kanazawa
- Composer: Yuki Sugiura
- Platforms: PlayStation Vita; Microsoft Windows; Nintendo Switch
- Release: JP: July 21, 2016; NA/EU: May 25, 2018
- Genre: Visual novel
- Mode: Single-player

7'scarlet is an otome visual novel video game developed by Otomate and Toybox Inc. It was released for the PlayStation Vita by Idea Factory in 2016 in Japan and by Aksys Games in 2018 in North America and Europe. The player reads through the story, making choices that determine its direction, and takes the role of college student Ichiko Hanamaki, who goes to the town of Okunezato to investigate the disappearance of her brother together with her friend Hino Kagutsuchi.

The game was directed and written by Tomio Kanazawa, with character designs by Chinatsu Kurahana and music by Yuki Sugiura. Although Kanazawa initially wanted to set the game in the real-life town Karuizawa, he ended up creating a fictional, crescent-shaped town based on it instead, with some features such as the main street remaining largely unaltered compared to their real-life counterparts. The game was well received by critics.

== Gameplay ==
7'scarlet is a visual novel in which the player reads through the story, and makes choices that affect the direction of the story; they need to replay the game multiple times and take different paths to uncover the whole story. The player character has a default name, but the player may change it if they wish; if they use the default name, dialogue mentioning the player character by name will be voiced. Throughout the game, items are added to the player's "TIPS" glossary, including explanations of terms and background stories for characters and locations.

== Plot ==
The game follows Ichiko Hanamaki, a college student whose brother has disappeared in the town of Okunezato a year prior to the start of the game. She and her childhood friend Hino Kagutsuchi find a website discussing mysteries surrounding the town, which will host an offline meetup in the town during the summer; Ichiko and Hino go there to investigate Ichiko's brother's disappearance.

== Development and release ==
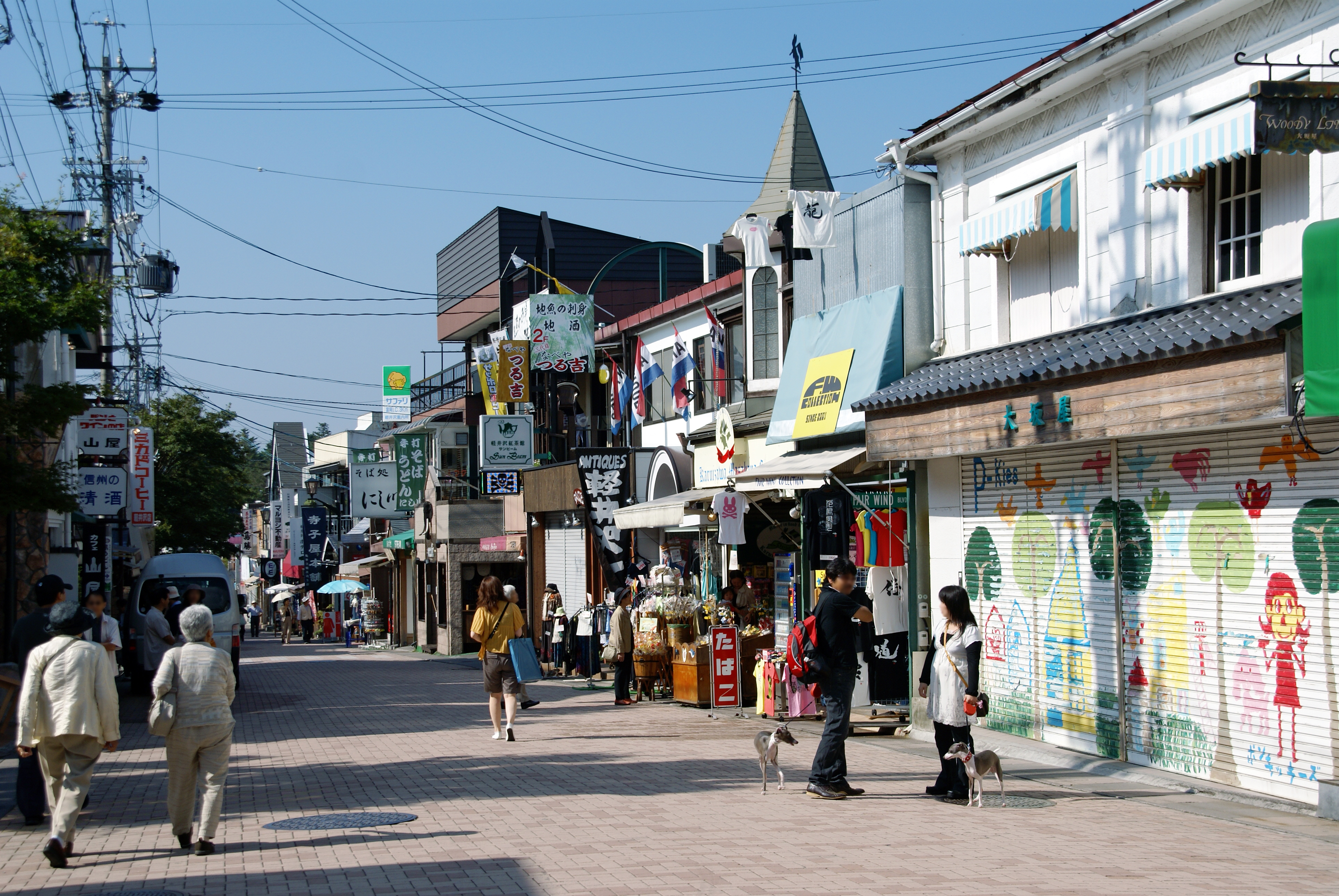
The town of Okunezato was based on Karuizawa; the main street was largely unchanged from the real-life Old Karuizawa Ginza Avenue (pictured).

7'scarlet was developed by Otomate and Toybox Inc., and was directed and written by Deadly Premonition producer Tomio Kanazawa, with character designs by Chinatsu Kurahana, and music by Yuki Sugiura. The opening theme, "World's End Syndrome", was performed by Kaori Oda and composed by Myu; the ending themes "Me no Mae no Hohoemi", "Koboresou na Tsuki" and "Itoshisa o Daita Hana" were performed by Mao, Oda, and Haruka Shimotsuki, respectively; and the insert song "Lovesick" was performed by A-TO and Auk Zero.

The town of Okunezato was based on the real-life town Karuizawa; Kanazawa had wanted to set a game in the actual Karuizawa, but was asked to make it a fictitious place, so he took artistic liberties with the location and changed it to a crescent-shaped town surrounded by forests and rivers; some specific areas remained largely unchanged, such as Okunezato's main street, based on the Old Karuizawa Ginza Avenue.

The game was announced along with several other Otomate games at their Otomate Party event in 2015. It was released for the PlayStation Vita by Idea Factory in Japan on July 21, 2016, and by Aksys Games in North America and Europe on May 25, 2018. Along with Psychedelica of the Black Butterfly and Psychedelica of the Ashen Hawk, it is part of Aksys Games' "Summer of Mystery" campaign; players who purchase all three can get a set of enamel pins. The North American physical release of 7'scarlet includes a set of character cards, and the Japanese deluxe edition of the game includes postcards, pin badges, a towel, and two audio dramas. The game's original soundtrack album was released by Muzzle Duzzle Musik Allerlei on November 25, 2016.

7'scarlet was released for the Nintendo Switch by Aksys Games on May 15, 2025.

== Reception ==
Reception

Review score
Publication	Score
Famitsu	32/40

Famitsu gave the game their Gold Hall of Fame award, saying that they enjoyed its mystery theme and how it was well integrated with the otome format despite how it was unusual to see the two elements combined. They also enjoyed learning more of the mystery on each new route they played through. 4Gamer.net enjoyed the music, saying that they liked the sense of mystery, and that the song "Through the Woods" in particular gave them goose bumps.

7'scarlet was the 16th best selling game in Japan during its debut week, selling 3,128 copies.
