= The Plucky Squire =

2024 video game

- Developer: All Possible Futures
- Publisher: Devolver Digital
- Directors: James Turner; Jonathan Biddle
- Producer: Kitty Crawford
- Designers: Hamish Lockwood; Julian Lia; Ahmin Hafidi; William Dionio
- Writer: James Turner
- Composer: Mike Georgiades
- Engine: Unreal Engine
- Platforms: Windows; PlayStation 5; Xbox Series X/S; Nintendo Switch
- Release: 17 September 2024
- Genre: Platform
- Mode: Single-player

The Plucky Squire is a 2024 platform video game developed by British studio All Possible Futures and published by Devolver Digital. The game follows the magical adventures of storybook characters Jot and his friends who discover a three-dimensional world outside the pages of their book. It was released for Windows, PlayStation 5, Xbox Series X/S and Nintendo Switch on 17 September 2024, to generally positive reviews from critics.

== Premise ==
The Plucky Squire is centered around the heroic Jot who is kicked out of his story book by the villainous Humgrump, forcing Jot to explore and face challenges both within his story book and the outside world. When the malevolent Humgrump realizes that he is the villain of the story who is destined to be defeated by the forces of righteousness led by the heroic Jot, he kicks the hero out of its pages and changes the story forever.

In order to restore the storybook's happy ending and save his friends from Humgrump's dark forces, Jot must face various challenges unlike anything he's ever seen. On his journey to restore the book's ending Jot finds himself with the ability to jump between the 2D and 3D worlds encountering puzzles he must solve and mini challenges to complete such as boxing badgers, jetpack flying, and many more obstacles as he becomes the hero of a living storybook. Some of the mini challenges involve playing as Jot's allies: these being Violet, a trainee witch and artist; and Thrash, a mountain troll and heavy metal drummer.

== Development ==
The Plucky Squire was developed by indie game studio All Possible Futures which was founded by James Turner and Jonathan Biddle. Before co-founding All Possible Futures, Turner was a designer for Game Freak and directed the video game HarmoKnight as well as art for various Pokémon games. Co-founder Biddle has previously worked with Devolver Digital as the creative director for The Swords of Ditto and founded the studio Onebitbeyond who also developed the game.

Characters Jot and Moonbeard were originally created by Turner for an online comic before using them for The Plucky Squire. English actor Philip Bretherton serves as the game's narrator.

== Release ==
The Plucky Squire was originally scheduled to release for Windows, PlayStation 5, Xbox Series X/S and Nintendo Switch in 2023, but Devolver Digital delayed the game to 2024. In August 2024, it was announced that the game would release on 17 September. At launch, It was made available to PlayStation Plus Extra and Premium subscribers at no additional cost.

== Reception ==
Reception

Aggregate scores
Aggregator	Score
Metacritic	(NS) 72/100 (PC) 83/100 (PS5) 77/100 (XBSX) 80/100
OpenCritic	85% recommended

Review scores
Publication	Score
Destructoid	9/10
Digital Trends	4/5
Eurogamer	4/5
Game Informer	7.25/10
GameSpot	9/10
GamesRadar+	4/5
Hardcore Gamer	4/5
IGN	7/10
Nintendo Life	6/10
Push Square	8/10
Shacknews	9/10

The Plucky Squire received "generally favorable" reviews from critics, according to review aggregator website Metacritic, with praise addressed towards its art direction and creativity, while critics were more mixed on the game's lack of difficulty, the abundance of minigames, and the frequent genre switching. According to OpenCritic, 85% of critics recommended the game.

The Nintendo Switch version received "mixed or average" reviews, with additional criticism addressed towards performance issues on the system. After the release of the Nintendo Switch 2, it was noted that the game ran natively better on this system through backward compatibility.

=== Awards and nominations ===
Year	Ceremony	Category	Result	Ref.
2024	Golden Joystick Awards	Best Indie Game	Nominated	
2024	Golden Joystick Awards	Best Game Trailer (Launch Trailer)	Nominated	
2024	The Game Awards 2024	Best Debut Indie Game	Nominated	
2024	The Game Awards 2024	Best Family Game	Nominated	
2025	28th Annual D.I.C.E. Awards	Family Game of the Year	Nominated	
2025	28th Annual D.I.C.E. Awards	Outstanding Achievement in Art Direction	Nominated	
2025	25th Game Developers Choice Awards	Best Debut	Honorable mention	
2025	25th Game Developers Choice Awards	Innovation Award	Honorable mention	
2025	21st British Academy Games Awards	Debut Game	Nominated	
2025	21st British Academy Games Awards	Family	Nominated	
2025	21st British Academy Games Awards	New Intellectual Property	Nominated	
2025	6th Pégases Awards	Best Foreign Independent Video Game	Nominated	
