= Yuji Yoshino =

Japanese composer

Yuji Yoshino (吉野裕司, Yoshino Yuji) is a Japanese composer who has done a variety of works in video game music, such as in .hack//Legend of the Twilight. He has also arranged a number of music collections for the Suikoden series, including Genso Suikoden IV Music Collection: Another World, some tracks of Genso Suikoden Celtic Collection 2, and all of Genso Suikoden Celtic Collection III. He also composed the soundtrack for the anime Spice and Wolf. Among his other works is the soundtrack for the visual novel Psychedelica of the Black Butterfly and the Ashen Hawk.
