= Tusks: The Orc Dating Sim =

2015 video game

- itch.io version cover
- Developer: Mitch Alexander
- Platform: Windows
- Release: 9 February 2018
- Mode: Single-player

Tusks: The Orc Dating Sim is a 2018 visual novel and dating simulator by Scottish independent developer Mitch Alexander. The game sees the player accompanying and romancing a band of travelling orcs. First published in 2015 for a game jam, Alexander based the design of the game on his native Scotland and his own experiences, with a desire for the game to subvert queer stereotypes by deconstructing the orc archetype in fantasy literature. Tusks received attention from several publications upon the release of its demo, with critics praising the inclusive design of diverse body types in a dating simulator game, and the relevance of its themes characterisation to broader queer experiences and identities.

== Gameplay ==
Tusks is a conventional visual novel in which the player character joins a band of orcs following the Uá, a celebration that unites the orcs of Alba. Over the course of several days, the player is able to choose to interact with the orcs over the days and nights of their travel, including five orcs, a selkie, a boar, and Aed, a human student studying the orcs. players The gameplay in Tusks features an 'autonomy' system that can be turned on and off by the player. If the autonomy system is turned on, non-player characters make decisions independently of the player that may not reflect the player's choices. For instance, a player decision to kiss an orc may be turned down, reciprocated, or delayed until later in the game.

== Development ==
Tusks was developed by Mitch Alexander, a game design graduate and independent developer based in Glasgow. Alexander conceived the initial concept for the game in 2015 during NaNoRenO, a game jam in which participants had one month to create a visual novel. He discussed that his focus on orcs was due to explore the relationship between the depiction of orcs in fantasy literature as "outsiders" and "inhuman" beings and the use of similar language in the marginalisation of minorities in the real-world. Alexander drew from his personal experiences in creating the game, basing the setting in a "semi-mythical version" of his native Scotland, his family's history as fairground travellers, and drawing from his experiences with anxiety and depression. A 'Day One' preview demo of the game was first released by Alexander on 18 July 2015, with the "full story" finalised in an update to the game on 9 February 2018. From December 2015 to February 2016, Alexander published Tusks: Extended Universe, a series of short stories set in the same universe as the game.

== Reception ==
The demo version of Tusks received positive reception. Several critics noted the game's inclusive character design in terms of body types and identities, with Tim Mulkerin of Unwinnable noting the "atypical depiction of the gay community" in the game, stating "instead of the hairless and impossibly buff images of gay men that have become all too common, the characters in Tusks have stretchmarks, bellies, and imperfections that might otherwise get smoothed out". Matt Baume of The Advocate similarly observed the inclusion of "body types beyond the usual sexualized physiques found in dating simulation games". Toby McCasker of Vice expressed that the game "explores diversity in a way that feels more natural than overly conscious".

Several critics commented on the game's characterisation and its relevance to broader messages about queer experiences and identities. Sabrina Biot of Computer Games Magazine noted the game's subversion of the orc stereotype, stating "the orcs don't exactly act like monsters - some of them are funny, sweet or smart, and they all have their own personalities and backgrounds". Writing for Unwinnable, Jeremy Signor discussed how the deconstruction of stereotypes of orcs in Tusks as "beings with depth" also "dispels the broken concept of essentialism" with respect to stereotypes and ostracism of gay men, stating that the game "has a lot to say about how we treat people both in fiction and in real life." Baume found the themes of the Ua gathering to be a "stand-in for queer community", noting that the game's references to a family of choice to be "familiar to many LGBT people who create a 'chosen family' in the wake of a family of origin's rejection".
