= Legrand Legacy =

2018 role-playing video game

Legrand Legacy: Tale of the Fatebounds
- Developer(s): Semisoft
- Publisher(s): Another Indie
- Engine: Unity
- Platform(s): Microsoft Windows, Nintendo Switch, PlayStation 4, Xbox One
- Release: Microsoft Windows: WW: January 24, 2018; Nintendo Switch: WW: January 24, 2019; PlayStation 4, Xbox One: WW: October 3, 2019
- Genre(s): Role-playing
- Mode(s): Single-player

Legrand Legacy: Tale of the Fatebounds is a role-playing video game developed by Semisoft and published by Another Indie. Semisoft describes the game as a "nostalgic love letter to classic JRPGs". The game was released in January 2018 on Microsoft Windows, and was released in 2019 for Nintendo Switch, PlayStation 4 and Xbox One.

== Gameplay ==
The game has been described by the game's developers as "nostalgic love letter to class JRPGs. The game features turn-based battles. The game's battle's contain quick time events, involving buttons quickly being pressed as directed - similar to that found in Final Fantasy VIII and The Legend of Dragoon, and a "weapons triangle" similar to that found in Fire Emblem, where there are three main weapon types, each type being stronger and weaker to one other type. Outside of battle, similar to Skies of Arcadia, the player may also recruit non-playable characters to reside and work in an old castle, which in turn offer new features and benefits to the player.

== Story ==
The story follows the protagonist Finn, a reluctant leader of a group of travelers. Finn has amnesia and special powers he doesn't understand, and is travelling through a world going through a civil war between Fandor and Altea.

== Development and release ==
Legrand Legacy was created and developed by Semisoft, a small video game company containing 27 in-house developers. Development of the game started in 2015, and development ran for 2 years with independent funding before turning to Kickstarter for additional funding. Two campaigns were done; an initial one, in November 2016, which was unsuccessful, and a second one, in January 2017, which met its funding goals. The successful campaign raised an additional £40,000 (approximately $54,000) for the latter part of development. The game's premise was to create a "love letter to classic JRPGs". The game was designed to feature 3D models that move over hand-drawn 2D backgrounds, a look shared by many PlayStation 1 and PlayStation 2 JRPGs. Influences for the game include Suikoden, The Legend of Dragoon, and Final Fantasy.

A "prologue demo" of the game was released in November 2016. An early build of the game was featured at SXSW, PAX East, and E3 2017. The game's final release was initially scheduled for September 2017, but was later delayed; the game released on Microsoft Windows on January 24, 2018, via Steam and GOG.com. Around the time of its original release, it was also announced that the game would later be released on other platforms as well; Nintendo Switch, PlayStation 4 and Xbox One in 2019.

== Reception ==
Reception

Aggregate score
Aggregator	Score
Metacritic	PC: 67/100

Legrand Legacy received mixed reviews from critics. At Metacritic, which assigns a normalized rating out of 100 to reviews from mainstream critics, the Windows release of the game has an average score of 67 out of 100 which indicates "mixed or average reviews", based on 10 reviews. RPGFan's review illustrated this mixed sentiment, asserting that while the developers accurately recreated the feel of classic JRPGs, this mean they recreated much of the good and the bad parts of the genre, stating that "Although it clearly has its flaws, I enjoyed the roughly 40 hours I spent with it all the same...Semisoft wished to create a "love letter" to JRPGs, and perhaps it did that in a most unintentional way. Legrand Legacy manages to capture much of the indelible charm of the JRPGs to which it pays homage through its rough-around-the-edges execution."
