= Long Gone Days =

- Developer: This I Dreamt
- Designer: Pablo Videla
- Programmer: Camilo Valderrama
- Artist: Camila Gormaz
- Writers: Pablo Videla, Camila Gormaz
- Composer: Sebastian Marín
- Engine: Unity
- Platforms: Linux; Microsoft Windows; Nintendo Switch; OS X; PlayStation 4; PlayStation 5; Xbox One; Xbox Series X/S
- Release: WW: October 10, 2023
- Genre: Role-playing
- Mode: Single-player

Long Gone Days is a role-playing video game for Windows, OSX and Linux developed by This I Dreamt and published by Serenity Forge. Written, developed and illustrated by Camila Gormaz, Long Gone Days features a dystopian story in which a young soldier becomes disillusioned for the cause of an operation he was part of, and deserts them to prevent an international war.

The original demo featuring the first hour was released for Windows and OSX on May 13, 2016. Early access to the game was released in March 2018, and the full version released on PlayStation 4, PlayStation 5, Xbox One, and Xbox Series X/S in October 2023.

The game received positive to mixed reviews, with critics praising the art direction and music score but criticizing the pacing of the story.

== Plot ==
In an unrecognized country named The Core, whose exact location is unknown, every individual is trained from birth for their job to become experts by adulthood. Rourke, a military sniper who has never visited the surface, is chosen as a last-minute replacement for an operation to aid the Polish forces in Kaliningrad, without much time to review the briefing.

After the mission of eliminating the targets they were assigned to, Rourke discovers all of them were civilians; and the squad's combat medic Adair reveals that it was actually a false flag operation. Rourke is appalled by their actions and by the fact nobody in his squad seems to mind the war crimes they are committing, so he decides to desert. Intrigued by his choice, Adair makes up his mind to follow Rourke along.

Taking advantage of his specialty, Adair reports a false illness that requires transferring Rourke to the nearest field hospital. They escape to the opposite direction of their two bases in Kaliningrad, but are quickly discovered after being spotted by drones and fellow soldiers from a nearby base they were unaware of; thus realizing the operation is much bigger than they were informed of.

With Rourke and Adair being chased by their own allies, as they have become deserters and enemies of The Core, they escape into the nearby city of Kaliningrad, where they meet Lynn and Ivan, both whom have also become disillusioned by the Core's activities.

As the four take the ferry and arrive in Germany, they realize that the attacks on Kaliningrad have reached international news. They meet the journalist Atiye who requests from them an interview regarding their escape there. However Atiye becomes tied up with her own issues as her partner Zoe gets involved with the Beqiri family, the local mafia who have been supporting Horst, a candidate for the upcoming national election. Upon investigating, the team meet Zoe's contact Cygnus, or by his real name Pascal, a former Beqiri Family member who assists them in saving Zoe. In the process, Rourke and Adair confront Sergeant Branna, who they defeat.

The group move on to Poland, where the city is now under curfew due the Core having set up headquarters at the Spire. With the help of a local girl named Hanna, who herself and her parents Sylwia and Piotr have also become disillusioned with the Core's activities, the team infiltrate the Spire with the intent of finding Weisner. They receive help from defected Sergeant Faye, who had once saved Lynn's life in her past before she escaped to Kaliningrad, and are able to defeat Sergeant Coyle, Weisner's right-hand man. They arrive at Weisner's office and confront him, with Rourke proclaiming that he will take ahold of his own future outside of what the Core had given him.

Months after Weisner's death, despite efforts to de-name Weisner and the Core, the Core continue to prosper due to the ignorance of the civilians. In spite of this, Rourke and his team vow to never stop fighting for world that they believe in.

== Gameplay ==
Long Gone Days is a role-playing game with visual novel elements that uses a top-down perspective. It features a traditional turn-based RPG combat, which allows the player to select which body-part of the enemy to aim. Since the story doesn't have fantasy or supernatural elements, instead of magic, the characters rely on morale. This stat can be raised or lowered by the choices the player may choose during dialogues in and outside battles, and it affects how each party member will perform in battle. If their Morale reaches zero, the character loses their will to fight.

Besides the turn-based combats, the game features a first-person sniper mode, which consists of seek and find mechanics.

Since the story is set in the real world, the non-player characters will speak in their native language depending on the country the characters are in. The player can recruit interpreters in order to buy at shops and complete quests.

== Development ==
Long Gone Days was originally conceived in 2003 by Gormaz as an RPG Maker 2000 project, but it was not until 2015 that the development of the demo began. The game was announced for the first time on the RPG Maker forums and TIG Source on January 17, 2016. On May 13, the Windows version of the demo was released, and an OSX port was released on July 14.

On July 11, 2016, Gormaz launched a crowdfunding campaign on the website Indiegogo. The campaign reached its goal on August 11, 2016, ending with US$21,300 raised by 567 people. According to the developer, the game will be around 4 to 5 hours long, and it will have two different endings. Serenity Forge published Long Gone Days for Linux, macOS, Windows, PlayStation 4 and 5, Xbox Series X/S and One, and Switch on October 10, 2023.

== Reception ==
On Metacritic, Long Gone Days received mixed reviews for Windows and positive reviews for the Switch. Although they praised the morale mechanic, Hardcore Gamer criticized what they felt were an "inconsistent tone and unconvincing meshing of visual styles". RPGamer praised the combat, visuals, and music, but they felt the pacing was too fast to cover the subject matter. RPGFan made it an editor's choice and called it "a gorgeously poignant game". RPG Site enjoyed the story and said the combat was "decently balanced". They recommended it to fans of narrative role-playing games set in the modern world.
