= Psychedelica of the Black Butterfly and the Ashen Hawk =

Psychedelica of the Black Butterfly Psychedelica of the Ashen Hawk
- Black Butterfly PlayStation Vita cover art
- Developer: Otomate
- Publishers: JP: Idea Factory (PSV); NA/EU: Aksys Games (PSV); WW: Intragames, Idea Factory (PC)
- Director: Momoko Terashima
- Artist: Satoru Yuiga
- Writers: Toono Chiharu; Yuriji
- Composers: Shigeki Hayashi; Yuji Yoshino
- Platforms: PlayStation Vita; Microsoft Windows
- Release: PlayStation Vita; Black Butterfly: JP: January 29, 2015; NA/EU: April 27, 2018; Ashen Hawk: JP: June 29, 2016; NA/EU: June 29, 2018; Microsoft Windows; Black Butterfly: WW: November 15, 2018; Ashen Hawk: WW: August 30, 2019
- Genre: Visual novel
- Mode: Single-player

Psychedelica of the Black Butterfly and Psychedelica of the Ashen Hawk (Note: Known in Japan as Kokuchō no Psychedelica (黒蝶のサイケデリカ, Kokuchō no Saikederika) and Haitaka no Psychedelica (灰鷹のサイケデリカ, Haitaka no Saikederika)) are two otome visual novel video games developed by Otomate. They were published for PlayStation Vita by Idea Factory in Japan in 2015 and 2016, and by Aksys Games in North America and Europe in 2018. Intragames and Idea Factory released Black Butterfly for Microsoft Windows in 2018, and Ashen Hawk in 2019.

In the games, the player reads the stories and make decisions that affect the direction of the plot, leading to different endings. Black Butterfly follows an amnesiac woman who is forced to partake in the black butterfly hunt, and Ashen Hawk follows a woman who is thought to be a witch and therefore disguises herself as a boy and lives outside the town.

== Gameplay ==
Black Butterfly and Ashen Hawk are visual novels in which the player reads through the story and makes choices such as what the player characters should say, affecting the direction of the plot and which of the games' endings the player ends up at. The games include an interactive flowchart, which the player can use to go back and try alternative choices and keep track of what they have done in the games. In addition to the main scenarios, there are side stories where the player learns more about the characters.

== Plot ==
Black Butterfly follows an amnesiac woman who wakes up in a Western house and is attacked by monsters. She meets men in the house who similarly cannot remember their pasts, and the group is forced to partake in the black butterfly hunt to gather the kaleidoscope fragments the monsters possess.

Ashen Hawk follows a woman whose right eye turns red when she feels strong emotions; in her hometown, women with red eyes are considered witches, so she disguises herself as a boy and lives in a tower outside the town.

== Development and release ==
Black Butterfly and Ashen Hawk were developed by Otomate, and were directed by Momoko Terashima and written by Toono Chiharu and Yuriji. The character design and artwork was handled by Satoru Yuiga, and the music was composed by Shigeki Hayashi and Yuji Yoshino. Screen Mode performed Black Butterfly's opening theme, "Bloody Rain"; Akiko Shikata performed Ashen Hawk's, "Haizora no Shizuku"; and Eiko Shimamiya performed both games' ending themes, "Kokuchō no Psychedelica" and "Vermelho".

The games were originally published in Japan by Idea Factory for PlayStation Vita: Black Butterfly on January 29, 2015, and Ashen Hawk on June 29, 2016. Aksys Games announced at Anime Expo 2017 that they would publish the games internationally: Black Butterfly was published in North America and Europe on April 27, 2018, and Ashen Hawk on June 29, 2018. Along with 7'scarlet, they were part of Aksys Games' "Summer of Mystery" campaign; players who purchased all three can get a set of enamel pins. The North American physical releases of Black Butterfly and Ashen Hawk also include a set of character cards. A Microsoft Windows version of Black Butterfly with English, Japanese, Korean, and traditional Chinese language options was published by Intragames and Idea Factory on November 15, 2018; a Windows version of Ashen Hawk, with the same language options, is planned to be released in Q1/Q2 2019.

Frontier Works released the ending theme to Black Butterfly as a single on January 28, 2015, and the full soundtrack albums for the two games on November 30, 2016.

== Reception ==
Reception

Aggregate score
Aggregator	Score
Metacritic	78/100 (Black Butterfly); 78/100 (Ashen Hawk)

Review score
Publication	Score
Famitsu	32/40 (Black Butterfly); 33/40 (Ashen Hawk)

Both games were generally well received by critics, according to the review aggregator Metacritic. Black Butterfly was the 18th best selling video game in Japan during its debut week, selling 5,319 copies, while Ashen Hawk did not chart at all.

Famitsu enjoyed the games' dark atmosphere and the mysterious story, and praised the artwork and music. They also enjoyed the flowchart system that shows the story routes.
