= The Swords of Ditto =

2018 video game

- Developer: Onebitbeyond
- Publisher: Devolver Digital
- Director: Jonathan Biddle
- Designer: Jonathan Biddle
- Programmer: Jonathan Biddle
- Artist: David Hankin
- Writer: Ed Fear
- Composer: Niklas Ström
- Platforms: Linux; macOS; PlayStation 4; Windows; Nintendo Switch; Android; iOS
- Release: Linux, macOS, PlayStation 4, Windows; 24 April 2018; Nintendo Switch; 2 May 2019; Android, iOS; 23 October 2019
- Genre: Action role-playing
- Modes: Single-player, multiplayer

The Swords of Ditto is an action role-playing video game developed by British studio Onebitbeyond and published by Devolver Digital. It was released for Linux, macOS, PlayStation 4 and Windows on 24 April 2018, Nintendo Switch on 2 May 2019 and on Android and iOS on 23 October 2019. Director Jonathan Biddle, formerly of Curve Digital, would later found All Possible Futures and develop The Plucky Squire.

== Gameplay ==
The Swords of Ditto is an action role-playing video game with roguelike elements played from a top-down perspective. Players take control of a randomly generated hero character that is tasked with defeating an enemy known as Mormo within a certain amount of time. The game has a cyclical structure for iterative playthroughs; the main adventure repeats with a new character and altered world once the time limit has elapsed. The game supports two-player cooperative play.

== Development and release ==
The Swords of Ditto was developed by Onebitbeyond, an indie studio founded by Jonathan Biddle, who serves as game's creative director. Biddle was previously a co-owner and design director of Curve Digital; he left the company in 2015 to form Onebitbeyond. The Swords of Ditto's writer, Ed Fear, noted that the game's story was designed to be unobtrusive due to the roguelike nature of the game.

The game was announced by its publisher Devolver Digital in June 2017. The game was released for PlayStation 4, Windows, Linux, macOS on 24 April 2018, and Nintendo Switch on 2 May 2019 under the game title, The Swords of Ditto: Mormo's Curse.

The free update titled Mormo's Curse was released on 2 May 2019 which included a big overhaul to the overall structure of the game, performance improvements, and bug fixes. This update also made the game available for Nintendo Switch.

== Reception ==
Reception

Aggregate score
Aggregator	Score
Metacritic	PC/PS4: 74/100; NS: 76/100

Review scores
Publication	Score
Nintendo Life	7/10
TouchArcade	3.5/5

The Swords of Ditto received "mixed or average" reviews from professional critics according to review aggregator Metacritic.
