= Next Up Hero =

2018 video game

- Developer: Digital Continue
- Publisher: Aspyr
- Engine: Unity
- Platforms: Microsoft Windows; OS X; PlayStation 4; Xbox One; Nintendo Switch
- Release: WW: June 28, 2018; Nintendo Switch: WW: August 16, 2018
- Genres: Action, dungeon crawl
- Modes: Single-player, multiplayer

Next Up Hero is an action dungeon crawl video game developed by New York indie studio Digital Continue and published by Aspyr. It was released for Steam Early Access on January 18, 2018, with a full release on June 28, 2018 alongside the PlayStation 4 and Xbox One versions. It was released for Nintendo Switch on August 16, 2018.

== Gameplay ==
Next Up Hero is an action dungeon crawl game video game featuring a cast of eclectic heroes with special abilities who will all take turns trying to conquer tough monsters. Death results in the next hero being able to resurrect their fallen brethren as an AI companion, called an "Echo," to do battle alongside them.

== Development ==
The game was developed in Unity. Digital Continue was founded by 5th Cell alumnus, Joe Tringali and describes Next Up Hero as an “asynchronous co-op, 2D/3D orthographic projection with isometric angle twin-stick arcade game played on server-hosted sessions".

Next Up Hero was announced at RTX in Austin, TX on July 14, 2017.

A closed beta was available until January 10, 2018 on Steam for Windows. The game launched in Early Access on January 11, 2018 on Steam for Windows.

== Reception ==
Reception

Review scores
Publication	Score
Nintendo Life	5/10
Push Square	6/10

Next Up Hero received generally mixed reviews from critics.

Nintendo Life similarly gave it 5 stars out of 10, stating, "Turning death into an applicable AI co-op mechanic is a neat spin on a game with a high death turnover, and its cartoon art style complements an impressively large menagerie of monsters to kill. Unfortunately, there are inherent problems with balancing and some disastrous technical problems." Push Square gave the game 6 stars out of 10, writing, "Online-only play taints Next Up Hero and obviously puts off potential players, but this bright and colourful world can be enjoyable at times. Repetitive gameplay prevents the release from becoming a standout indie title, but it may have enough charm to entice a few aspiring heroes for at least a few hours."
