= City of Brass (video game) =

2018 video game

- Developer: Uppercut Games
- Publisher: Uppercut Games
- Designer: Ed Orman
- Artist: Andrew James
- Engine: Unreal Engine 4
- Platforms: PlayStation 4, Windows, Xbox One, Nintendo Switch
- Release: PS4, Windows, Xbox One; May 4, 2018; Switch; February 8, 2019
- Genre: Dungeon crawl
- Mode: Single-player

City of Brass is a single-player first-person dungeon crawl video game, set in a procedurally generated, Arabian Nights-themed city of interconnecting corridors, courtyards and rooms. Players assume the role of a thief, fighting to reach a treasure hidden in the heart of a mythical city filled with traps and enemies. It was developed by Australian independent video game studio Uppercut Games and was announced on 6 July 2017 as being in development for Microsoft Windows, PlayStation 4, and Xbox One. The Windows version was released on Steam via its Early Access program on 18 September 2017.

== Gameplay ==
The gameplay video released to coincide with the announcement shows the protagonist wielding a scimitar in the right hand and a whip in the left, and the team confirmed in an interview that the whip contributes to the gameplay in a number of ways: to grab objects, to trip, disarm or stun enemies, shatter barricades, trigger traps and switches and also to swing. Players must make their way through each level within a certain time limit, avoiding being killed by traps or enemies, collecting treasure along the way to increase their scores. Items found in the environment can be used as weapons, for example bricks or vases. As with most dungeon crawlers, death is permanent - players will have to start the game again on each playthrough.

The developers claim that City of Brass gameplay systems are designed to give the player the opportunity to combine them together in imaginative ways to overcome obstacles. Examples given include using the whip to stun an enemy before slicing them with the scimitar, sliding into enemies to push them into a trap, or baiting one enemy such that as it closes in to kill the player, it actually destroys other enemies nearby.

Since entering Early Access, the developers have released 10 updates adding new environments, enemies, weapons, relics and tweaking gameplay balance based on community feedback.

== Development ==
Members of the Uppercut team previously worked on BioShock and BioShock 2 while working for 2K Australia, and cite this as an influence in the development of the combination of gameplay genres of City of Brass. The team has stated that as developers they wanted to try their hand at procedural generation after finding the task of "hand-crafting every nook and cranny" very resource intensive for their previous game Submerged. In the same interview, Ed Orman claimed that procedural generation allowed a higher degree of polish to be applied to modular environmental pieces which were then subsequently combined to produce a variety of original level designs.

Designer Ed Orman and artist Andrew James gave a talk at GCAP 2017 entitled Procedural Generation in City of Brass. In this talk, the team explained its goal for City of Brass was to generate a believable and playable environment from a single seed at run time, with the engine only manipulating pieces of the game world. To achieve this, the developers employed a heavily modified version of the Dungeon Architect plug-in for Unreal Engine 4, with enhancements introduced by "walking around the perimeter" of each procedurally generated level to make amendments to improve the layout and playability.

== Release ==
The game had an early access release in September 2017 on PC. The PlayStation 4 version was released on May 4, 2018.

== Reception ==
Reception

Aggregate score
Aggregator	Score
Metacritic	PC: 69/100; PS4: 66/100; XONE: 67/100; NS: 75/100

Review scores
Publication	Score
Destructoid	6.5/10
Game Informer	7.75/10
GameSpot	7/10
IGN	4/10
Nintendo Life	9/10
Pocket Gamer	3/5
Push Square	6/10

City of Brass, the PlayStation 4 version released on May 4, 2018, received a score of 66 out of 100 from Metacritic from critics. The Xbox One version received a slightly higher score of 67. The PC game received 69/100 from Metacritic.

Destructoid praised the look of the game and the weapons mechanics, particularly the whip. PC Gamer especially felt the whip was a positive aspect of the game. Rolling Stone reviewed it before the main release, and overall gave it positive praise.

GameSpot gave it a mediocre review, saying there were performance issues, but that the game was notable for its "impressive balance between its pacing, difficulty curve, and combat systems." IGN was more critical, and felt the game was repetitious. It gave it a "bad" score of 4 out of 10 for being "maddeningly" difficult. PCWorld called it forgettable but functional.
