= PQube =

Instrument measuring electrical power quality

PQube (Electric power instrument)
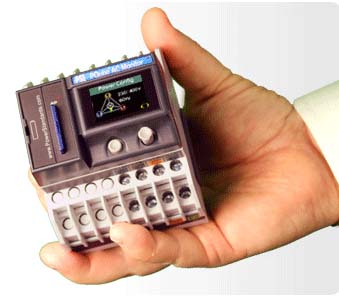

PQube is a registered trademark of Power Standards Lab for an electronic measuring instrument that records power quality and electric energy on the electric power grid.

== Applications ==
PQube instruments are widely used to gather data for academic research, and at United States Department of Energy National Laboratories and state energy regulators. U.S. federal government agencies use PQubes to detect power quality issues – for example, the Federal Aviation Administration tracks disturbances at radar control centers.

Each PQube instrument is traceable to the National Institute of Standards and Technology, so often these instruments are used in international academic and research environments.

PQubes are a key element in many smart grid projects, recording power disturbance and power flow data to examine efficiency and reliability effects.

== Information on the Web ==
Approximately 50 PQubes, located in approximately 40 countries, have been designated by their owners as free public sources of information at http://map.pqube.com . The site is updated approximately every 2 minutes with worldwide power quality and energy recordings.

Data from these PQubes can be used, for example, for developing and testing power quality algorithms. Available data include daily, weekly, and monthly files in GIF and Microsoft Excel CSV format. Voltage and current oscillographs are recorded during every power disturbance and these worldwide locations, and are freely available. Data from each worldwide site is updated approximately once per minute.
