= Lists of video games =

This is a list of all video game lists (also known as Ludography), sorted by varying classifications. The classification depends on a variety of component.

== By computer ==
=== Major computers ===
==== PC games ====
- List of PC games
  - List of free PC games

===== Linux =====
- List of Linux games

====== MS-DOS and Windows ======
- Index of DOS games
- List of Windows 3.x games
- Index of Windows games
  - List of Games for Windows titles
    - List of Games for Windows – Live titles
    - List of Windows Games on Demand
  - List of Xbox Live games on Windows 8.x
  - List of Xbox Live games on Windows 10
  - List of Xbox Live games on Windows Phone

====== MSX ======
- List of MSX games

==== Apple ====
- List of Apple II games
- List of Apple IIGS games
- List of Macintosh games

=== Mini-major computers ===
Amstrad

- List of Amstrad CPC games
- List of Amstrad PCW games

Atari

- List of Atari ST games
- List of Atari XEGS games

Commodore

- List of Commodore PET games
- List of Amiga games
- List of Commodore 16 games
- List of Commodore 64 games
- List of VIC-20 games

Sinclair

- List of ZX Spectrum games

Browser based games

- List of browser games
- List of Stadia games

=== Minor computers ===
Tandy

- List of TRS-80 games
- List of TRS-80 Color Computer games

Casio

- List of Casio PV-2000 games
- List of Casio PV-7 games

Other systems

- List of Philips VG5000 games
- List of Bandai RX-78 games
- List of Camputers Lynx games
- List of CCE MC-1000 games
- List of Compucolor II games
- List of CyberVision 2001 games
- List of DAI Personal Computer games
- List of Enterprise 64/128 games
- List of Micronique Hector I games
- List of Jupiter Ace games
- List of Acorn Electron games
- List of Coleco Adam games
- List of FM Towns games
- List of HP3000 games
- List of Kaypro games
- List of PC Booter games
- List of SAM Coupé games
- List of Mattel Aquarius games
- List of Mindset games
- List of PEL Orao games
- List of Sega AI Computer games (Note: Sega was better known for its video game consoles)
- List of Sord M5 games
- List of Samsung SPC-1000 games
- List of SV (Spectravideo) games
- List of Telmac 1800 games
- List of Tomy Tutor games
- List of VideoBrain Family Computer games

== By console ==
=== Major consoles ===
==== Microsoft Xbox ====
- List of Xbox games
  - List of Xbox System Link games (Note: Online service)
  - Xbox Live Arcade
- List of Xbox 360 games
  - List of Xbox 360 games (A–L)
  - List of Xbox 360 games (M–Z)
  - List of Xbox 360 System Link games
  - List of Xbox games compatible with Xbox 360
  - Xbox Live Arcade
- List of Xbox One games (Note: Online service Xbox Game Pass)
  - List of Xbox One games (A–L)
  - List of Xbox One games (M–Z)
  - List of backward-compatible games for Xbox One and Series X/S
  - List of Xbox One X enhanced games
- List of Xbox Series X and Series S games

==== Nintendo ====
===== Home consoles =====
- List of Nintendo Entertainment System games
  - List of Famicom Disk System games
- List of Super Nintendo Entertainment System games
  - List of Satellaview broadcasts (Note: Over the air broadcast)
- List of Virtual Boy games
- List of Nintendo 64 games
  - List of Nintendo 64DD games
- List of GameCube games
- List of Wii games
  - List of WiiWare games
  - List of Virtual Console games for Wii
- List of Wii U games (Note: Also includes digital only games)
  - List of Wii games on Wii U eShop
  - List of Virtual Console games for Wii U
- List of Nintendo Switch games
- List of Nintendo Switch 2 games
  - Nintendo Classics

===== Handheld consoles =====
- List of Game & Watch games
- List of Game Boy games
  - List of multiplayer Game Boy games
  - List of Super Game Boy games
- List of Game Boy Color games
- List of Game Boy Advance games
- List of Pokémon Mini games
- List of Nintendo DS games
  - List of DSiWare games and applications
- List of Nintendo 3DS games
  - List of Virtual Console games for Nintendo 3DS

==== Sega ====
- List of SG-1000 games
- List of Master System games
  - List of TecToy Master System 131 games
- List of Sega Genesis games
  - List of Meganet games
  - List of Sega Channel games
  - List of Sega CD games
  - List of 32X games
- List of Sega Saturn games
- List of Dreamcast games
- List of Game Gear games (Note: Handheld console system)
- List of Sega Pico games (Note: Educational console system)
  - List of Advanced Pico Beena games

==== Sony ====
- List of PlayStation games
  - List of PlayStation games (A–L)
  - List of PlayStation games (M–Z)
  - Lists of downloadable PlayStation games (Note: Online service in which PS1 games were forward compitable with later Playstation systems for digital download only.)
- List of PlayStation 2 games
  - List of PlayStation 2 games (A–K)
  - List of PlayStation 2 games (L–Z)
  - Lists of downloadable PlayStation 2 games (Note: Online service in which PS2 games were forward compitable with later Playstation systems for digital download only.)
- List of PlayStation 3 games (Note: Includes games from Playstation Online service PlayStation Network which offer games for digital download only)
  - List of PlayStation 3 games (A–C)
  - List of PlayStation 3 games (D–I)
  - List of PlayStation 3 games (J–P)
  - List of PlayStation 3 games (Q–Z)
- List of PlayStation 4 games
  - List of PlayStation 4 games (A–L)
  - List of PlayStation 4 games (M–Z)
  - List of PlayStation 4 free-to-play games
  - List of PlayStation VR games
- List of PlayStation 5 games
- List of PlayStation VR2 games
- List of PlayStation Portable games
  - List of downloadable PlayStation Portable games
  - List of PlayStation minis
- Lists of PlayStation Vita games
  - List of PlayStation Vita games (A–D)
  - List of PlayStation Vita games (E–H)
  - List of PlayStation Vita games (I–L)
  - List of PlayStation Vita games (M–O)
  - List of PlayStation Vita games (P–R)
  - List of PlayStation Vita games (S)
  - List of PlayStation Vita games (T–V)
  - List of PlayStation Vita games (W–Z)
- Lists of PlayStation Store games (Note: Store within the PlayStation Network which offer games for digital download only)
- High-definition remasters for PlayStation consoles

=== Mini major consoles ===
Atari

- List of Atari 2600 games
- List of Atari 5200 games
- List of Atari 7800 games
- List of Atari Jaguar games
- List of Atari Jaguar CD games
- List of Atari Lynx games

Bandai

- List of Bandai Super Vision 8000 games
- List of Design Master Senshi Mangajukuu games
- List of Playdia games
- List of Pippin games
- List of Terebikko games
- List of WonderSwan games
- List of WonderSwan Color games

Commodore

- List of Commodore CDTV games
- List of Amiga CD32 games

Mattel

- List of Hyperscan games
- List of Intellivision games
- List of Pixter games

NEC

- List of PC-FX games
- List of TurboGrafx-16 games

Philips

- List of CD-i games
- List of Magnavox Odyssey games
- List of Magnavox Odyssey² games

SNK

- SNK Neo Geo Games
- List of SNK Neo Geo Pocket and Neo Geo Pocket Color games

The 3DO Company

- List of 3DO Interactive Multiplayer games

Coleco

- List of ColecoVision games

=== Minor consoles ===
Casio

- List of Casio Loopy games
- List of Casio PV-1000 games

Epoch

- List of Cassette Vision games
- List of Super Cassette Vision games
- List of Epoch Game Pocket Computer games

Leapfrog

- List of ClickStart games
- List of Leapfrog Didj games
- List of Leapfrog Leapster games
- List of Leapfrog Explorer games
- List of Leapfrog LeapTV games

Tiger Electronics

- List of Game.com games
- List of R-Zone games

VTech

- List of VTech CreatiVision games
- List of VTech Socrates games
- List of VTech V.Flash games
- List of VTech V.Smile games
- List of VTech V.Smile Baby games

Handheld consoles

- List of Watara Supervision games
- List of Tapwave Zodiac games
- List of N-Gage games
- List of commercial GP32 games
- List of GP2X games
- List of GP2X Caanoo games
- List of Gizmondo games
- List of Game Master games
- List of GameKing I/II games
- List of GameKing III games
- List of Gamate games
- List of Entex Select-A-Game games
- List of Creatronic Mega Duck games
- List of Arcadia 2001 games

Home consoles

- List of 1292 Advanced Programmable Video System
- List of Action Max games
- List of Amstrad GX4000 games (Note: Amstrad was better known for its Home computers)
- List of APF Imagination APF-M1000 games
- List of Bally Astrocade games
- List of BBC Bridge Companion games
- List of Fairchild Channel F games
- List of FM Towns Marty games
- List of Gakken Compact Vision TV Boy games
- List of Zapit Game Wave games
- List of Pioneer LaserActive games
- List of Vectrex games
- List of Zeebo games
- List of Nichibutsu My Vision games
- List of Nuon games
- List of RCA Studio II games
- List of Super A'Can games
- List of Memorex VIS games
- List of Takara Video Challenger games
- List of View-Master Interactive Vision games
- List of XavixPORT games
- List of Interton VC 4000 games
- List of PC-50x Family games
  - List of SHG Black Point games
  - List of Palladium Tele-Cassetten Game games

== Other platforms ==
=== Mobile ===
- List of iOS games
- List of Ouya games

=== Arcade ===
- List of arcade video games

== By publisher ==
- List of 2K games
- List of Activision video games
- List of Atari, Inc. games
- List of Atari, Inc. (Atari, SA subsidiary) games
- List of Atlus games
- List of Blizzard Entertainment games
- List of Capcom games
- List of Cygames games
- List of Disney Interactive Studios games
- List of Electronic Arts games
- List of King games
- List of Koei games
- List of Kojima Productions games
- List of Konami games
- List of Namco games
- Lists of Nintendo games
  - List of Nintendo products
- List of video games published by Rockstar Games
- List of Sega games
- List of SNK games
- List of Sony Interactive Entertainment video games
- List of Take-Two Interactive games
- List of Ubisoft games
- List of Xbox Game Studios video games

== By hardware ==
- List of accessories to video games by system
- List of arcade video games
- List of dedicated video game consoles
- List of handheld game consoles
- List of home video game consoles
- List of microconsoles
- List of retro style video game consoles

== By date ==
- List of video games released in 2012
- List of video games released in 2013
- List of video games released in 2014
- List of video games released in 2015
- List of video games released in 2016
- List of video games released in 2017
- List of video games released in 2018
- List of video games released in 2019
- List of video games released in 2020
- List of video games released in 2021
- List of video games released in 2022
- List of video games released in 2023
- List of video games released in 2024
- List of video games released in 2025
- List of video games released in 2026

== By development status ==
- Lists of cancelled video games
- List of video games in development
- List of video games in early access
- List of video game vaporware

== By character or franchise ==
- List of .hack media
- List of Beatmania video games
- List of Bleach video games
- List of Bomberman video games
- List of Castlevania media
- List of Dance Dance Revolution video games
- List of Digimon video games
- List of Disney video games
- List of Eamon adventures
- List of F-Zero media
- List of Final Fantasy video games
- List of Final Fantasy media
- List of Guitar Freaks and Drum Mania video games
- List of Kirby media
- List of The Legend of Zelda media
- List of Mega Man video games
- List of Metroid media
- List of Mortal Kombat media
- List of Nancy Drew video games
- List of Naruto video games
- List of Pokémon video games
- List of Resident Evil media
- List of The Simpsons video games
- List of Sonic the Hedgehog video games
- List of Star Wars video games
- List of StarCraft media
- List of Story of Seasons video games
- List of Transformers video games
- List of Xenosaga characters
- List of video games featuring Miis
- List of WWE video games
  - List of WWE 2K Games video games

=== Mario ===
- List of Donkey Kong video games
- List of Luigi video games
- List of Mario educational games
- List of Mario puzzle games
- List of Mario racing games
- List of Mario role-playing games
- List of Mario sports games
- List of Wario video games
- List of Yoshi video games
- List of video games featuring Mario

== By feature ==
- List of augmented reality video games
- List of computer games with spawn versions
- List of gacha games
- List of geolocation-based video games
- List of stereoscopic video games
- List of video games that support cross-platform play
- List of local multiplayer video games by system

== By region ==
=== Development ===
- List of video games developed in Austria
- List of video games developed in Belgium
- List of video games developed in the Czech Republic
- List of video games developed in Estonia
- List of video games developed in France
- List of video games developed in Hong Kong
- List of video games developed in Iran
- List of video games developed in Ireland
- List of video games developed in the Netherlands
- List of video games developed in Portugal
- List of video games developed in Slovakia
- List of video games developed in Spain
- List of video games developed in Turkey

== By genre ==
=== Action ===
- List of beat 'em ups
- List of fighting games
- List of first-person shooters
- List of light-gun games
- List of maze video games
- List of platform game series
- List of third-person shooters

=== Casual and puzzle ===
- List of party video games
- List of puzzle video games
  - List of Tetris variants
- List of quiz arcade games

=== Role-playing ===
- List of role-playing video games
  - List of action role-playing video games
  - List of massively multiplayer online role-playing games
    - List of MUDs
  - List of roguelikes
  - List of tactical role-playing video games

=== Simulation ===
- List of simulation video games
  - List of business simulation video games
  - List of city-building video games
  - List of god video games
  - List of racing video games
  - List of space flight simulation games

=== Sports ===
- List of American football video games
- List of association football video games
- List of Australian rules football video games
- List of baseball video games
- List of basketball video games
- List of Formula One video games
- List of golf video games
- List of ice hockey video games
- List of licensed professional wrestling video games
- List of NASCAR video games
- List of rugby union video games
- List of snowboarding video games
- List of sumo video games
- List of Olympic video games
- List of tennis video games
- List of volleyball video games
- List of WWE video games

=== Strategy ===
- List of 4X video games
- List of artillery video games
- List of chess software
- List of grand strategy video games
- List of multiplayer online battle arena games
- List of real-time strategy video games
- List of real-time tactics video games
- List of turn-based strategy video games
- List of turn-based tactics video games

=== Other ===
- List of card game-based video games
- List of Christian video games
- List of educational video games
- List of erotic video games
  - List of eroge
- List of graphic adventure games
- List of historical video games
- List of horror video games
- List of music video games
- List of ninja video games
- List of survival video games
- List of text-based computer games
- List of vampire video games
- List of Western video games
- List of World War I video games
- List of World War II video games
- List of zombie video games

== By technology ==
- List of cel-shaded video games
- List of RPG Maker games

== By license ==
- List of freeware video games
  - List of freeware first-person shooters
- List of open-source video games
- List of commercial video games released as freeware
- List of commercial video games with available source code
- List of crossovers in video games
- List of video games based on anime or manga
- List of video games based on cartoons
- List of video games based on comics
  - List of video games based on DC Comics
- List of video games based on films

== By player type ==
- List of cooperative video games
- List of massively multiplayer online games
  - List of free massively multiplayer online games
  - List of massively multiplayer online first-person shooter games
  - List of massively multiplayer online real-time strategy games
  - List of massively multiplayer online turn-based strategy games
- List of free multiplayer online games
- List of multiplayer browser games

== By reception ==
- List of banned video games
- List of best-selling game consoles
- List of best-selling video games
  - List of best-selling PC games
  - List of best-selling video game franchises
  - List of highest-grossing arcade games
- List of commercial failures in video games
- List of controversial video games
- List of recalled video games
- List of video games listed among the best
- List of video games notable for negative reception

== Other ==
- Lists of video game soundtracks
- List of most expensive video games to develop
- List of pinball manufacturers
- List of video game crowdfunding projects
- List of video game console emulators
- List of video game remakes and remastered ports
- List of video games derived from modifications
- List of video games in the Museum of Modern Art
- List of video games notable for speedrunning
- List of video games with LGBT characters

== See also ==
- List of video game websites
- List of video gaming topics
- Lists of films
- Lists of television programs
- Lists of books
- Lists of comics
