= Lightsword =

Lightsword may refer to:

- Lightsaber, a fictional sword in the Star Wars franchise
- Lightsword, a call sign and nickname of the 623rd Air Control Squadron of the United States Air Force
- Lightsword, a GameKing/GameKing II game

== See also ==
- Sword of Light (disambiguation)
