= Index of Windows games =

This is an index of Microsoft Windows games.

This list has been split into multiple pages. Please use the Table of Contents to browse it.

This list contains 4580 game titles across all lists. (Note: This number is always up to date by this script.)

== See also ==
- Lists of video games
- Index of DOS games
- List of Windows 3.x games
