= List of video games developed in Turkey =

This is a list of released and upcoming video games that are developed in Turkey. The list is sorted by game title, platform, year of release and their developer. This list does not include serious games.

Title	Platform	Year	Developer
Barbaros	Commodore 64	1986	UFO Computer
Keloğlan	Commodore 64, ZX Spectrum	1989	Byte Bilgisayar
Asterix (Unofficial)	Amiga	1991	Locus Team
Dinozorus	Amiga 1200	1991	Uğur Özyılmazel
Dead Breath	Amiga	1992	Locus Team/Locus Design
Hançer	Amiga	1992	Future Dreams
İstanbul Efsaneleri: Lale Savaşçıları	Amiga, Windows, Linux	1994	SiliconWorx
Dual Blades	Gameboy Advance	2001	Vivid Image
Siemens: Görevimiz Temizlik	Windows	2008?	?
Mount & Blade: Warband	Windows	30 March 2010	TaleWorlds
Süpercan	Windows	6 May 2011	Sobee
Caillou Çiftlikte	Windows	2012	?
Monochroma	Windows	28 May 2014	Nowhere Studios
Zula	Windows, Android, iOS	22 February 2015	MadByte Games
Mount & Blade	Windows	16 September 2008	TaleWorlds
Mount & Blade: With Fire & Sword	Windows	3 May 2011	TaleWorlds
Mount & Blade II: Bannerlord	Microsoft Windows, Xbox One, Xbox Series X/S, PlayStation 4, PlayStation 5	30 March 2020	TaleWorlds
Anomaly Agent	Microsoft Windows, Nintendo Switch, Xbox One, Xbox Series X/S	24 January 2024	Phew Phew Games
Feather Party	Microsoft Windows	03 March 2024	threeW Games
Liar's Bar	Windows	02 October 2024	Curve Animation
Warden's Will	Microsoft Windows	08 Jan 2025	ELYZIO
okey.gg	Windows, MacOS, Linux	09 May 2025	yilmaz.games
Zombie Graveyard Simulator	Microsoft Windows	05 June 2025	threeW Games
Supermarket Simulator	Windows, MacOS, Xbox Series X/S, PlayStation 4, PlayStation 5	19 June 2025	Nokta Games
Anomaly President	Windows	03 August 2026	Phew Phew Games
Pera Coda	TBA	2026	ELYZIO & Falan
BOMBANANA!	Windows, MacOS	09 November 2026	Lefto Studio
Ertugrul of Ulukayin	TBA	Q4 2026	Tekden Studio
