= Sega Pico =

Educational video game console

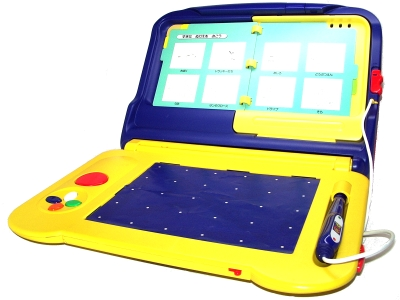
- Also known as: Kids Computer Pico; KOR: Samsung Pico
- Manufacturer: Sega Toys
- Type: Home video game console
- Generation: Fourth
- Released: JP: June 1993; NA: November 1994; EU: 1994; KOR: 1995
- Introductory price: JP¥13,440; US$139; CN¥690; US$49.95 (Majesco)
- Discontinued: EU: 1998; NA: February 1998; KOR: 2002; JP: 2005
- Units sold: JP: 3.4 million; NA: 400,000 (as of January 1996)
- Media: "Storyware" (Cartridge)
- CPU: Motorola 68000 @ 7.6 MHz
- Memory: 64 KB RAM, 64 KB VRAM
- Display: Progressive: 320×224, 256×224 (NTSC) or 320×240, 256×240 (PAL) pixels, 512 color palette, 61 colors on-screen; Interlaced: 320×448, 256×448 (NTSC) or 320×480, 256×480 (PAL)
- Sound: Texas Instruments SN76489, NEC μPD7759
- Successor: Advanced Pico Beena

The Sega Pico, also known as Kids Computer Pico, (Note: Japanese: キッズコンピューター・ピコ, Hepburn: Kizzu Konpyūtā Piko) is an educational video game console by Sega Toys. The Pico was released in June 1993 in Japan and November 1994 in North America and Europe. Sales in South Korea and China began in 1995 and 2002 respectively.

Marketed as "edutainment", the main focus of the Pico was educational video games for children between 3 and 7 years old. Releases for the Pico were focused on education for children and included titles supported by licensed franchised animated characters, including Sega's own Sonic the Hedgehog series.

Though the Pico was sold continuously in Japan through the release of the Beena, in North America and Europe the Pico was less successful and was discontinued in early 1998, later being re-released by Majesco. Overall, Sega claims sales of 3.4 million Pico consoles and 11.2 million game cartridges, and over 350,000 Beena consoles and 800,000 cartridges. It was succeeded by the Advanced Pico Beena, released in Japan in 2005. The ePico, the successor to the Pico and Beena, was also released in Japan in 2024.

== Design and software ==
A screenshot from Sonic Gameworld, an example of a typical Pico game

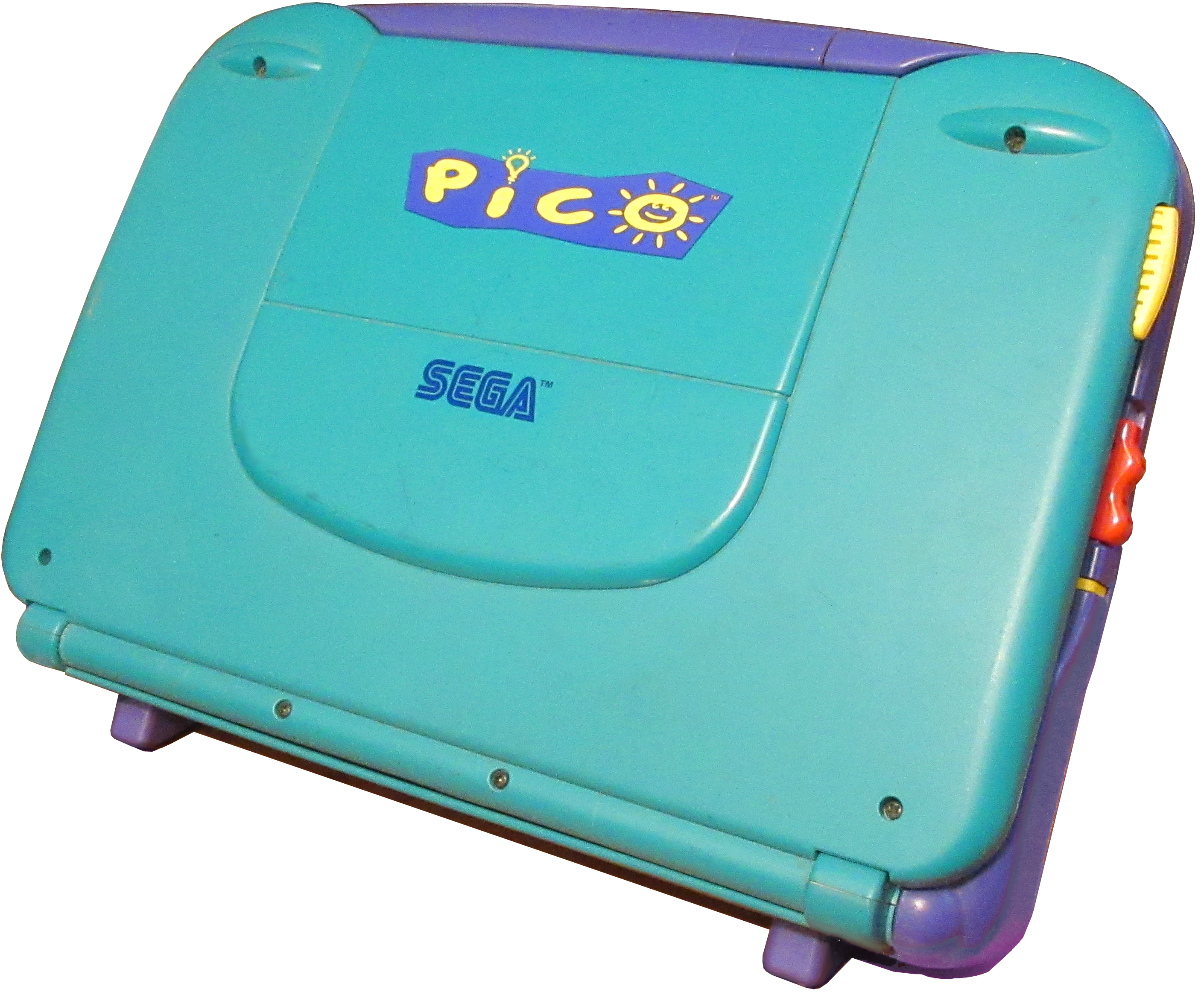
Sega Pico in folded position

Powered by the same hardware used in the Sega Genesis, the physical shape of the Pico was designed to appear similar to a laptop. Included in the Pico is a stylus called the "Magic Pen", and a pad to draw on. Controlling the games for the system is accomplished either by using the Magic Pen like a mouse, or by pressing the directional buttons on the console. The Pico does not include a screen, and instead must be connected to a monitor through the composite video output. Touching the pen to the pad allows drawing, or moving/animating a character on the screen.

Cartridges for the system were referred to as "Storyware", and took the form of picture books with a cartridge slot on the bottom. The Pico changes the television display and the set of tasks for the player to accomplish each time a page is turned. Sound, including voices and music, also accompanied every page. Games for the Pico focused on education, including subjects such as music, counting, spelling, reading, matching, and coloring. Titles included licensed animated characters from various franchises, such as Disney's The Lion King: Adventures at Pride Rock and A Year at Pooh Corner. Sega also released titles including their mascot, Sonic the Hedgehog, including Sonic Gameworld and Tails and the Music Maker.

According to former Sega console hardware research and development head Hideki Sato, the development of the Sega Pico was possible due to the company's past work on the My Card cartridges developed for the SG-1000, as well as on drawing tablets. The sensor technology used in the pad came from that developed for the 1987 arcade game World Derby, while its CPU and graphics chip came from the Genesis. The Pico does not include the Genesis's sound coprocessor and FM sound chip, the Zilog Z80 and Yamaha YM2612 respectively, leaving only the Texas Instruments SN76489 PSG integrated onto the console's graphics chip as the main sound generator alongside the addition of an NEC μPD7759 ADPCM chip that was borrowed from Sega's arcade system boards of the time such as the System 16B and System C2.

== History ==
At a price of ¥16,000, the Pico was released in Japan in June 1993. In North America, Sega unveiled the Pico at the 1994 American International Toy Fair, showcasing its drawing and display abilities ahead of its release in November. The console was advertised at a price of approximately US$160, but was eventually released at a price of US$139. "Storyware" cartridges sold for US$39.99 to 49.99. The Pico's slogan was "The computer that thinks it's a toy." The Pico would later be released in China in 2002, priced at CN¥690.

The Pico was recognized in 1995 by being listed on Dr. Toy's 100 Best Products, as well as being listed in Child as one of the best computer games available. According to Joseph Szadkowski of The Washington Times, "Pico has enough power to be a serious learning aid that teaches counting, spelling, matching, problem-solving, memory, logic, hand/eye coordination and important, basic computer skills." Former Sega of America vice president of product development Joe Miller claims that he named his dog after the system because of his passion for the console. The Pico also won a few awards, including the "National Parenting Seal of Approval", a "Platinum Seal Award", and a gold medal from the "National Association of Parenting Publications Awards".

After a lack of success, Sega discontinued the Pico in North America in early 1998. Later, in August 1999, a remake of the Pico made by Majesco was released in North America at a price of US$49.99, with Storyware titles selling at US$19.99. According Steven L. Kent, he claims that Sega of Japan CEO Hayao Nakayama watched the Pico "utterly fail" in North America.

In early 1995, Sega of America reported that it had sold 400,000 units in North America. In 2000, Sega claimed that the Pico had sold 2.5 million units. As of April 2005, Sega claims that 3.4 million Pico consoles and 11.2 million software cartridges had been sold worldwide.

== Yamaha Copera ==
In December 1993, Yamaha released the Copera in Japan at a price of ¥35,000. The Copera is an enhanced variant of the Pico designed for musical education, with additional sound hardware such as a Yamaha FM sound chip and a new PCM sound chip (Note: Presumably based on the 2/4-op 18/12-channel YMF262 (OPL3) and a four-channel PCM audio chip according to reverse engineering efforts), stereo audio output, a microphone input, and two MIDI ports. It is compatible with all Pico software, as well as dedicated software making use of the enhanced hardware known as 'Mixt Books', which are not compatible with regular Pico hardware.

== Advanced Pico Beena ==
Advanced Pico Beena
- Manufacturer: Sega Toys
- Type: Home video game console
- Generation: Sixth
- Released: JP: August 6, 2005
- Lifespan: 2005–2011
- Discontinued: JP: 2011
- Media: "Storyware" (Cartridge)
- CPU: ARM7TDMI @ 81 MHz
- Predecessor: Sega Pico

The Advanced Pico Beena, also known simply as Beena or BeenaLite, is an educational console system targeted at young children sold by Sega Toys, released in August 2005 exclusively in Japan. It is the successor to the Pico and marketed around the "learn while playing" concept. According to Sega Toys, the focus of the Advanced Pico Beena is on learning in a new social environment and is listed as their upper-end product. Topics listed as being educational focuses for the Beena include intellectual, moral, physical, dietary, and safety education. The name of the console was chosen to sound like the first syllables of "Be Natural".

Compared to the Pico, Beena adds several functions. Beena can be played without a television and supports multiplayer via a separately sold additional Magic Pen. The console also supports data saving. Playtime can be limited by settings in the system. Some games for the Beena offer adaptive difficulty, becoming more difficult to play based on the skill level of the player. The Beena Lite, a more affordable version of the console, was released on July 17, 2008. As of 2010, Sega estimated that 4.1 million Beena consoles had been sold, along with 20 million game cartridges.

In 2014, Sega launched the educational mobile app Telebeena that could be paired with a (Sharp) smart TV.

== ePico ==
The ePico is an educational console system targeted at young children sold by Sega Fave, released on October 10, 2024 in Japan. It is the successor to the Advanced Pico Beena.

The ePico is similar in nature to the Cocopad (the Japanese version of the LeapPad) and requires special picture book software to function, as with the Pico and Beena among others, however it is not compatible with Pico, Beena, or Cocopad/LeapPad software. The ePico also uses a special mat that allows it to be used without relying on the stylus (also called Magic Pen), and has an additional function that is planned to be developed for the "ePico Enthusiasm Report," a personal page for parents that will report on what their child is interested in using the "multiple intelligences theory" developed at Harvard University.

== See also ==
- List of Sega Pico games
