= List of action role-playing video games =

This is a comprehensive index of commercial action role-playing games (Action RPGs), sorted chronologically by year. Information regarding release platform, release type, game setting, developers, publishers, and country of origin is provided where available. The table can be sorted by clicking on the small boxes next to the column headings.

This page includes any games listed as either Action RPGs or Soulslikes. This page does not currently include games listed as Looter shooters

== See also ==
- Lists of video games
- List of tactical role-playing video games
