= List of recalled video games =

This is a list of video games that have been recalled for various reasons after their initial release and then rereleased on a later date.

== List ==
Title	Scale	Reason	Reported Date
Atelier Lise ~The Alchemist of Orde~	Japan	Contained several major bugs, which often leads to the game crashing.	2008
Atelier Marie: The Alchemist of Salburg	Japan	The initial print run of the Dreamcast version was infected by the Kriz computer virus which affected Microsoft Windows systems. The screensaver virus that came with the bonus content partition in the GD-ROM erased CMOS and BIOS settings, and attempted to overwrite files located on hard drives and the local network.	2001
Batman: Arkham Knight	Worldwide	Massive issues with performance on PC, regardless of the quality of the system being used.	2015
Biz Nouryoku DS Series: Wagokoro no Moto	Japan	One day before release, one of the people who worked in the game was arrested for groping a woman. Some copies were sold, since the recall happened on launch.	2007
Cyberpunk 2077	Worldwide	Widespread complaints about technical issues and bugs; poor performance on Xbox One and PlayStation 4 consoles.	2020
Disney's Animated Storybook: The Lion King	North America	Due to a highly-publicised incident involving initial copies of the game crashing on Compaq Presario computers with certain video drivers, defective copies of the game were recalled in exchange for a newer edition of the game with wider hardware support. The Lion King controversy eventually led to the development of the more popular DirectX multimedia API.	1994
Fantasia	Worldwide	Sega was granted the licensing against the wishes of Walt Disney.	1992
Final Lap	North America	Atari and Namco were sued by Phillip Morris over its use of Marlboro and other cigarette logos in the game. An upgraded ROM for arcades was issued removing the cigarette logos.	1990
Formula 1 97	Worldwide	While no content was edited from the game, a legal issue regarding the inclusion of the FIA logo in the game's box art prompted the game to be recalled and re-released with a new box art without the FIA logo.	1997
Fruits Mura no Doubutsutachi 2: Osora no Fruits Land	Japan	A bug was discovered, which can corrupt saved data.	2006
Grand Theft Auto: San Andreas	Worldwide	The "Hot Coffee" mod which unlocks a minigame in which the main character has sex with his girlfriend. See Hot Coffee minigame controversy.	2005
The Guy Game	North America	One of the girls featured in the game sued the developers, claiming the footage was released without her consent and that she was a minor at the time of filming.	2005
Wii ports of Humongous Entertainment games	North America	The Wii ports of Freddi Fish and the Case of the Missing Kelp Seeds, Pajama Sam: No Need to Hide When It's Dark Outside, and Spy Fox: Dry Cereal, published by Majesco and ported by Mistic Software, were recalled in 2009 due to GNU GPL violations pertaining to ScummVM engine; all three games were recalled as a part of the port developer's settlement with ScummVM developers.	2008
Kakuto Chojin	United States, Japan	Use of a verse from the Qur'an.	2003
The Legend of Zelda: Ocarina of Time	United States	Use of quotes from the Qur'an and the use of the Islamic Symbol.	1998
Limbo of the Lost	Europe, North America	Immediately after its US release, this game developed by Majestic Studios (published by Tri Synergy in the US) was recalled due to allegations of plagiarizing many well-known games and movies.	2007 (EU) 2008 (NA)
LittleBigPlanet	Worldwide	Quotes from the Qur'an mixed with music.	2008
Mario Party	United States	Sued by the New York Attorney General over joystick movements that can cause injury. Nintendo was ordered to issue gloves to help reduce arm injuries.	2000
Mario Party 8	United Kingdom	Use of the word "spastic," which is considered highly offensive in the UK.	2007
Metroid: Other M	Japan	The game has a serious game breaking software bug where it is possible for Samus Aran to accidentally get stuck in sector 3 by having a door lock up permanently.	2010
Mind Quiz	United Kingdom	Use of the word "spastic," which is considered highly offensive in the UK.	2006
Myth II: Soulblighter	Worldwide	Contained a bug where, if the game was installed to the root of the user's hard drive and subsequently uninstalled, it would remove all data from the hard drive.	1998
Quiz Magic Academy DS	Japan	Contained several major bugs, which often leads to the game crashing.	2008
The Race Against Time	United Kingdom	The original print of the game was recalled due to its unauthorised use of the likeness of American track and field athlete Jesse Owens. Subsequent pressings used a picture of Carl Lewis; Lewis offered his likeness for free to benefit the Sport Aid charity. ACE later placed it as one of the biggest marketing disasters of 1988.	1988
Samurai Shodown V Special (AES version)	Worldwide	An attempt to censor some of the finishing moves created several bugs, such as with the game's training mode.	2004
Segagaga	Japan	The original release featured a character been called "Adult Child", which was considered offensive by the Japan Adult Children's Association.	2001
SNK vs. Capcom: Card Fighters DS	United States	A bug exists where the game could crash after talking to an opponent that must be defeated to progress in the second play through.	2007
Sonic Blast Man	North America, Japan	Young players fractured or injured wrists and arms as a result of hitting the Blastman's punching pad without using the gloves.	1995
Spider-Man 2: Enter Electro	Worldwide	Several stage names and dialogues were changed and a building in the final stage was modified to remove resemblance with the World Trade Center due to sensitivity issues, since the game was released after the September 11 attacks.	2001
Super Monaco GP	North America	Sega sued by Phillip Morris over its use of Marlboro logos in the game. An upgraded ROM for arcades was issued removing the cigarette logos.	1991
Super Paper Mario	Europe, Australia	A bug in level 2-2 caused the game to crash when a certain optional line of dialogue was triggered due to code that prompted the player to select a response, even though it had no options for responses. This was triggered if the game's language was set to English, German, or Spanish. A revision was released shortly after that fixed the bug.	
Taiko no Tatsujin: Touch de Dokodon!	Japan	The game contained a bug that made it unplayable if all save files featured Don-chan wearing costumes.	2007
Tales of Graces	Japan	The game contained many bugs, especially when playing a new game on "New Game+" mode.	2010
Tetris: The Soviet Mind Game	North America	Tengen Console Versions recalled due to licensing issues. Tetris was licensed to Andromeda software by ELORG (at the time owned by the Government of Russia) for use only on personal computers. Andromeda Software then sub-licensed the game to Mirrorsoft. Mirrorsoft then illegally sold Console Rights to Atari Games and their subsidiary Tengen. Tengen then released their own version of Tetris for Nintendo and Sega in North America and then sub-licensed these rights to Bullet Proof Software for the Japanese market. However when Bullet Proof Software (BPS) and Nintendo tried to the license the handheld rights from ELORG, Bullet Proof Software was told that ELORG never licensed the console rights to anyone. Nintendo and BPS would eventually license the console and handheld Tetris rights from ELORG. Atari and Tengen sued Nintendo over this and lost as Mirrorsoft did not have these rights. Atari and Tengen had to recall their version of Tetris as the result.	
Tiger Woods 99 (PlayStation version only)	Worldwide	The dummy file in the game was revealed to be The Spirit of Christmas a.k.a. Jesus vs. Santa, created by the creators of South Park, which EA viewed as "offensive to consumers". No such file existed in the PC version.	1999
Too Human and X-Men: Destiny	Worldwide	Due to legal issues regarding the use of Unreal Engine 3 between Silicon Knights and Epic Games, these two games were recalled, with all unsold copies destroyed.	2012
Wrestle Kingdom (Xbox 360 version only)	Japan	Issues with saving to Xbox 360's hard drive prompted a recall of the game.	2005
WWF No Mercy	Worldwide	The game's internal memory would occasionally erase saved game progress.	2000

== See also ==
- Lists of video games
