= List of video games developed in the Republic of Ireland =

This is a list of video games developed in Ireland.

Title	Developer	Publisher	Platforms	Original Release Date
Space Funeral	thecatamites	thecatamites	Windows	September 17, 2010
Anthology of the Killer	thecatamites	thecatamites	Windows, macOS, Linux	May 28, 2024
Phantom Fighter	Emerald Software	Martech	Amiga	October 1988
FranknJohn	bitSmith Games	bitSmith Games	Windows, Linux	March 4, 2015
Ku : Shroud of the Morrigan	bitSmith Games	bitSmith Games	Windows, Mac, Linux, Android, iOS	March 17, 2014
ZompireWolf	DurtBird	DurtBird	iOS, Android, Windows, Mac	TBA (Abandoned in 2017)
After Life	Green Sawdust	Green Sawdust	Windows, Mac	November 2016
Guild of Dungeoneering	Gambrinous	Versus Evil	Windows, Mac	July 14, 2015
Project G	Nebula Interactive	Nebula Interactive	Windows	May 13, 2016
Deadstone	Timeslip Softworks	Timeslip Softworks	Windows, Mac	November 12, 2014
FRZ: Free Racing Zero	SixMinute	Fingersoft	iOS, Android	2014
The Very Hungry Caterpillar™ – Shapes & Colors	StoryToys	StoryToys	iOS	2016
Cellular	Tribal City Interactive	Tribal City Interactive	iOS	2016
Speed Freaks	Funcom Dublin Ltd.	Sony Computer Entertainment	PlayStation	September 15, 1999
Impact Racing	Funcom Dublin Ltd.	JVC Musical Industries	PlayStation, Saturn	July 1, 1996
Championship Motocross Featuring Ricky Carmichael	Funcom Dublin Ltd.	THQ	PlayStation	August 15, 1999
Lifespeed	Wee Man Studios	Wee Man Studios	New Nintendo 3DS	2016
Pitstop	Eirplay Games	AirG	Nokia Series 40 & 60	2005
Mindframe Arena	Fierce Fun	Fierce Fun	Windows, IOS, Android	2018
Empire of Sin	Romero Games	Paradox Interactive	Windows, macOS, PlayStation 4, Xbox One, Nintendo Switch	December 1, 2020
Kill Phil	squaregang	squaregang	Web Browser	June 11, 2021
Harmful The Second Tape	Tooth and Claw Games	Tooth and Claw Games	Windows, Mac, Linux	August 28, 2020
The House of Unrest (Dread X Collection: The Hunt)	Dan McGrath	DreadXP	Windows	April 14, 2021
Ready or Not	Void Interactive (Cork)	Void Interactive	Windows	December 17, 2021
