= Lists of arcade video games =

This is a list of arcade video games organized alphabetically by name. It does not include PC or console games unless they were also released in video arcades. See lists of video games for related lists.

This list contains 4609 game titles.

== See also ==
- List of highest-grossing arcade games
- List of Amiga arcade conversions
- Killer List of Videogames
