= Sword of Light (disambiguation) =

The Sword of Light is an Irish and Scottish mythological sword.

Sword of Light may also refer:

- Sword of Light, a fictional sword of Gourry Gabriev in the light novel series Slayers
- Falchion, also known as the Sword of Light, a fictional sword in the video game Fire Emblem: Shadow Dragon and the Blade of Light
- Sword of Light, a fictional sword in the television series Mighty Morphin Power Rangers
- Sword of Light, a fictional sword of the Black Knight in the Marvel Universe
- Sword of Light, a fictional sword in the film League of Gods
- Sword of Light, a fictional sword in the television series Niko and the Sword of Light
- Sword of Light, a fictional sword in the video game Dragon Quest XI

== See also ==
- Lightsword (disambiguation)
