= Eirplay =

Computer game company

- Industry: Web and mobile games
- Founded: 2002
- Founder: Peter Lynch
- Defunct: 2009; 16 years ago
- Headquarters: Ireland

Eirplay was an Irish computer game company founded by Peter Lynch. The company developed web and mobile games (J2ME) for a variety of platforms and publishers. It was founded in 2002 and ceased trading in 2009. Eirplay was based in the Digital Hub, Dublin, Ireland. The company published games for both the Irish market and international mobile games marketplace.

Distributors: Handango, AirGames, SSG, Selatra, Eirborne, Trust5

Company legal status: Private limited company

Directors: Michael Lynch; Peter Lynch

Mobile Java (J2ME) Games produced by Eirplay	Year
Claw	2004
Crazy Crèche	2003
Monster Madness	2003
Khofu	2005
Dropkick	2004
Strike Attack	2005
Toxic Terrors	2006
Pitstop	2006
Whack a Maoi	2006

== Awards ==
Sep 2003 - Eirplay wins a commendation award at the Hothouse (Dublin Institute of Technology) Awards for Best Start-up Company.

Jan 2004 - The company wins ‘Game Developer of the Year’ at the O2 Digital Media Awards

Nov 2007 - Eirplay wins the Eircom Web Innovation Award with Playza
