= List of local multiplayer video games by system =

This is a list of video games which can be played by multiple users on a singular device. This page is not about LAN Play.

== Computer ==
Title	Genre(s)	Year	Players	Windows	OS X	Linux	Controller Support	Notes	Source
Bloody Trapland	Platformer	2013	4	Yes	No	No	Yes		
Dungeon Defenders	Action RPG, Tower Defense	2011	4	Yes	Yes	Yes	Yes		
Gang Beasts	Beat 'em up, Party	2014 (Early Access)	8	Yes	Yes	Yes	Yes		
Helldivers	Shoot 'em up	2015	4	Yes	No	No	Yes		
Hyper Ultra Astronautics	Action, Shoot 'em up, Party	2019	16	Yes	No	Yes	Yes		
Magicka	Action, RPG, Adventure	2011	4	Yes	No	No	Yes		
Monaco: What's Yours Is Mine	Action, Adventure, Casual, Indie, Strategy	2013	4	Yes	Yes	Yes	Yes		
Move or Die	Action, Indie	2016	4	Yes	Yes	Yes	Yes		
Octodad: Dadliest Catch	Action, Adventure, Indie	2014	4	Yes	Yes	Yes	Yes		
Overcooked	Action, Casual, Indie, Simulation	2016	4	Yes	No	No	Yes		
Overcooked 2	Action, Casual, Indie	2018	4	Yes	Yes	Yes	Yes		
Panic Party	Action, Party	2017	4	Yes	Yes	Yes	Yes		
Photon Rush	Racing, Action, Party	2017	16	Yes	Yes	Yes	Partial		
Rocket League	Sports	2015	4	Yes	Yes	Yes	Yes		
Serious Sam 3: BFE	FPS	2011	4	Yes	Yes	Yes	Yes		
SpeedRunners	Platformer	2016	4	Yes	Yes	Yes	Yes		
Trine	Action, Adventure, Indie	2009	3	Yes	Yes	Yes	Yes		
Trine 2	Action, Adventure, Indie	2013	3	Yes	Yes	Yes	Yes		
Ultimate Chicken Horse	Action, Casual, Indie	2016	4	Yes	Yes	Yes	Yes		
Worms Ultimate Mayhem	Strategy	2011	4	Yes	No	No	Partial		
CD-RUN	Platformer	2019	8	Yes	No	No	Yes		

== Dreamcast ==
Title	Genre(s)	Year	Players	Available	Notes	Source
Power Stone 2	Fighting	2000	4	JP, NA, EU		
AeroWings	Flight Simulator	1999	4	JP, NA, EU		
Animastar	Role Playing	2000	4	JP		
Aoi Hagane no Kihei: Space Griffon	Side Scroller, Shooter	1999	4	JP		
Aqua GT	Racing	2000	4	PAL		
Armada	Shooter	1999	4	NA		
Army Men: Sarge's Heroes	Action	2000	4	NA, PAL		
Atari Anniversary Edition	Miscellaneous, Compilation	2001	4	NA		
Atsumare! GuruGuru Onsen	Miscellaneous, Board Games	1999	4	JP		
Atsumare! GuruGuru Onsen BB	Miscellaneous, Board Games	2000	4	JP		
Baldr Force EXE	Action	2004	4	JP		
BassRush Dream	Sports, Nature, Fishing	2000	4	JP		
Battle Beaster	Action	2001	4	JP		
BikkuriMan 2000 Viva! Festival!	Miscellaneous	2000	4	JP		
Black/Matrix AD	Strategy, Turn-Based, Fantasy	1999	4	JP		
Blue Sky Blue	Adventure	2003	4	JP		
Blue Submarine No. 6: Saigetsu Fumahito- Time and Tide	Adventure	2000	4	JP		
Boko Yume no Tatsujin	Adventure	2002	4	JP		
Boku no Tennis Jinsei	Sports, Traditional, Tennis	2001	4	JP		
Boku to Bokura no Natsu	Sports, Traditional, Tennis	2002	4	JP		
Boku, Doraemon	Adventure	2001	4	JP		
Bomber Hehhe	Adventure	2002	4	JP		
Bomberman Online	Puzzle, Action	2001	4	NA		
Border Down	Action, Shooter, Scrolling	2003	1	JP		

== GameCube ==
Title	Genre(s)	Year	Players	Available	Notes	Source
Alien Hominid	Platform game, Shoot 'em up, Run and gun	2004	2	NA		
Battle Stadium D.O.N	Fighting	2006	4	JP		
Bloody Roar: Primal Fury	Fighting	2002	2	JP, NA, PAL		
Capcom vs. SNK 2 EO	Fighting	2003	2	JP, NA, PAL		
Custom Robo	Action RPG	2004	4	JP, NA		
F-Zero GX	Racing	2003	4	JP, NA, PAL	16:9 support.	
Final Fantasy Crystal Chronicles	Action RPG	2003	4	JP, NA, PAL	Each player must use a Game Boy Advance as a controller.	
Gauntlet Dark Legacy	Hack and slash, dungeon crawl	2002	4	NA, PAL		
Geist	FPS	2005	4	NA		
Gotcha Force	Action RPG	2003	4	JP, NA		
James Bond 007: Nightfire	FPS	2002	4	NA, PAL		
Kirby Air Ride	Racing	2003	4	JP, NA, EU, AUS		
Lego Star Wars: The Video Game	Action-Adventure	2005	2	NA, EU		
Mario Kart: Double Dash	Racing	2003	4	JP, EU, NA, AUS	16-player multiplayer via LAN connection is available.	
Mario Party 4	Party	2002	4	JP, EU, NA, AUS, BRA, KO		
Mario Party 5	Party	2003	4	NA, JP, EU		
Mario Party 6	Party	2004	4	JP, NA, EU, AUS		
Mario Party 7	Party	2005	8	NA, JP, EU, AUS		
Mario Power Tennis	Sports	2004	4	JP, NA, PAL		
Medal of Honor: Frontline	FPS	2002	4	NA, EU		
Metroid Prime 2: Echoes	FPS, Adventure	2004	4	NA, EU, AUS, JP		
Naruto: Clash of Ninja	Fighting	2003/2006	2	NA, JP		
Naruto: Clash of Ninja 2	Fighting	2003/2006	4	NA, EU, JP		
Pac-Man Vs.	Party	2003	4	JP, NA, PAL	One player controls Pac-Man using a Game Boy Advance connected to the fourth controller port, while each of the other players controls a ghost.	
Phantasy Star Online Episode I & II	Action RPG, MMORPG	2002	4	JP, NA, EU	Online multiplayer also available.	
Soulcalibur II	Fighting	2003	2	JP, NA, EU		
Star Fox: Assault	TPS	2005	4	NA, JP, EU, AUS		
Super Mario Strikers	Sports	2005	4	EU, NA, JP, AUS		
Super Monkey Ball	Party	2001	4	NA, JP, EU, AUS		
Super Monkey Ball 2	Party	2002	4	NA, JP, EU, AUS		
Super Smash Bros. Melee	Fighting	2001	4	JP, NA, EU, AUS		
The Legend of Zelda: Four Swords Adventures	Action, Adventure	2004	4	JP, NA, EU, AUS	Each player must use a Game Boy Advance as a controller.	
TimeSplitters: Future Perfect	FPS	2005	4	NA, EU, AUS		
Viewtiful Joe: Red Hot Rumble	Fighting, Party	2005	4	JP, NA, EU, AUS		
WarioWare Inc Mega Party Game$	Party	2003	4	JP, NA, EU		
XIII	FPS	2003	4	NA, EU		

== Nintendo 64 ==
Title	Genre(s)	Year	Players	Available	Notes	Source
007: The World is Not Enough	FPS	2000	4	NA, EU		
1080: TenEighty Snowboarding	Sports, Snowboard	1998	2	NA, EU, JP, KO, AUS		
Banjo-Tooie	Platformer, Adventure, Action	2000	4	NA, EU, JP	16:9 supported	
Conker's Bad Fur Day	Platformer, Adventure, Action	2001	4	NA, EU, AUS		
Cruis'n USA	Racing	1996	2	NA, EU, SA		
Cruis'n World	Racing	1998	4	NA, EU		
Diddy Kong Racing	Racing	1997	4	NA, EU, JP, KO, AUS		
Donkey Kong 64	Platformer	1999	4	NA, PAL, AUS, JP	Expansion Pak required to play 16:9 supported	
Dr. Mario 64	Puzzle	2001	4	US		
Duke Nukem 64	Puzzle	1997	4	US, EU	Duke Nukem 3D (PC) with censures	
F-Zero X	Racing	1998	4	NA, EU, JP, AUS		
GoldenEye 007	FPS, Action	1997	4	NA, EU, JP, SA, AUS		
International Superstar Soccer 64	Sports, Soccer	1997	4	NA, EU, JP		
Killer Instinct Gold	Fighting	1996	2	NA, EU		
Mario Golf	Sports, Golf	1999	4	NA, EU, JP, AUS	Released as "Mario Golf 64" in Japan.	
Mario Kart 64	Racing	1996	4	JP, NA, EU		
Mario Party	Party, Boardgame	1998	4	JP, NA, EU		
Mario Party 2	Party, Boardgame	1999	4	JP, NA, AUS, EU		
Mario Party 3	Party, Boardgame	2000	4	JP, NA, EU, AUS		
Mortal Kombat 4	Fighting, 3D	1998	2	US, EU		
Mortal Kombat Trilogy	Fighting	1996	2	US, EU		
Perfect Dark	FPS, Action	2000	4	JP, NA, EU, AUS		
Pokémon Stadium	Strategy	2000	4	JP, NA, EU, SA, AUS	Released as "Pocket Monsters Stadium 2" in Japan.	
Pokémon Stadium 2	Strategy	2000/2001	4	JP, NA, EU, AUS	Released as "Pokemon Stadium Kin Gin Crystal Version" in Japan.	
Super Smash Bros.	Fighting	1999	4	JP, NA, EU		
The New Tetris	Puzzle	1999	4	US, EU		
Tony Hawk's Pro Skater	Sports, Skateboard	2000	2	US, EU		
Tony Hawk's Pro Skater 2	Sports, Skateboard	2001	2	US, EU		
Tony Hawk's Pro Skater 3	Sports, Skateboard	2002	2	US		
Turok: Rage Wars	FPS	1999	4	US, EU		
Turok 2: Seeds of Evil	FPS	1998/1999	4	US, EU, JP, AS		
Turok 3: Shadow of Oblivion	FPS	2000	4	US, EU		
Worms Armageddon	Strategy	1999/2000	4	US, EU		

== Nintendo Switch ==
Title	Genre(s)	Year	Players	Available	Pro controller support	GC controller support	Notes	Source
Mario Tennis Aces	Sports	2018	4	WW	Yes	?		
Shovel Knight Treasure Trove	Platformer	2014	4	WW	Yes	?		
Super Smash Bros. Ultimate	Fighting	2018	8	WW	Yes	Yes		
Super Mario Maker 2	Platformer	2019	4	WW	Yes	?		
Donkey Kong Country: Tropical Freeze	Platformer	2018	2	WW	Yes	?		
New Super Mario Bros. U Deluxe	Platformer	2019	4	WW	Yes	?		
INK	Platformer	2018	2	WW	Yes	?		
Flat Heroes	Platformer	2018	4	WW	Yes	?		
Pode	Puzzle Platformer	2018	2	WW	Yes	?		
Human: Fall Flat	Puzzle Platformer	2017	2	WW	Yes	?		
Putty Pals	Puzzle Platformer	2017	2	WW	Yes	?		
Bloodstained: Curse of the Moon 2	Action Platformer	2020	2	WW	Yes	?		
Luigi's Mansion 3	Action Adventure	2019	8	WW	Yes	?	2 player coop, 8 player versus	
Mario Kart 8 Deluxe	Racing	2017	4	WW	Yes	Yes		
Quiplash 2 InterLASHional	Party game	2020	8	WW	?	?		
Just Dance 2022	Party game, Music	2021	6	WW	?	?	Smartphone can be used as controller	
Worms W.M.D.	Turned based tactics	2017	6	WW	Yes	?		
Naruto Shippuden Ultimate Ninja Storm 4	Fighting	2016/2020	2	WW	Yes	?		

== PlayStation ==
Title	Genre(s)	Year	Players	Multitap	Available	Notes	Source
Bishi Bashi Special	Party	2000	8	Yes	JP, EU		
Crash Bash	Party	2000	4	Yes	NA, EU, JP		
Crash Team Racing	Racing	1999	4	Yes	NA, EU		
Team Buddies	Tactical Shooter	2000	4	Yes	EU, NA		
Twisted Metal	Vehicular combat	1995	2	No	NA, EU, JP		
Twisted Metal 2	Vehicular combat	1996	2	No	NA, EU, JP		
Twisted Metal III	Vehicular combat	1998	4	Yes	NA, EU, JP		
Twisted Metal 4	Vehicular combat	1999	4	Yes	NA, EU, JP		
Loaded	Top down shooter	1995	2	No	NA, EU, JP		
Star Wars: Jedi Power Battles	Hack and slash	2000	2	No	NA		

== PlayStation 2 ==
Title	Genre(s)	Year	Players	Multitap	Available	Notes	Source
Champions of Norrath	Action role-playing, hack and slash	2004	4	Yes	NA, EU		
Champions: Return to Arms	Action role-playing, hack and slash	2005	4	Yes	NA, EU		
Gauntlet Dark Legacy	Hack and slash, dungeon crawl	2001	4	Yes	JP, NA, PAL		
Ratchet & Clank 3	Platformer, TPS	2004	4	Yes	NA, EU, AUS, JP		
The Adventures of Cookie & Cream	Action adventure	2000	2	Yes	NA, EU, AUS, JP		

== PlayStation 3 ==
Title	Genre(s)	Year	Players	Available	Notes	Source
Call of Duty: Modern Warfare 2	FPS	2009	4	EU, JP, NA, AUS		
WWE 2K17	Fighting, Action	2016	7	NA, AU, EU, JP		
LittleBigPlanet 2	Platformer	2011	4	NA, EU, AU, UK		
WWE All Stars	Fighting, Action	2011	4	NA, EU		
WWE Legends of WrestleMania	Fighting, Action	2009	4	NA, AU, EU, JP		
Call of Duty: Ghosts	FPS	2013	2	NA, EU		
Injustice: Gods Among Us	Fighting, Action	2013	2	EU		
Gran Turismo 6	Racing, Simulation	2013	2	AU, EU, JP, KO		
Kane & Lynch: Dead Men	FPS, Action	2007	2	NA, EU, AU		
Kane & Lynch 2: Dog Days	FPS, Action	2010	2	NA, AU, EU		
Call of Duty: Black Ops	FPS	2010	4	EU, JP, NA, AUS		
FIFA 16	Sports	2015	7	NA, EU		
Army of Two	FPS, Action	2008	2	NA, EU, AU, JP		
Army of Two: The 40th Day	FPS, Action	2010	2	NA, AU, EU, JP		
Army of Two: The Devil's Cartel	FPS, Action	2013	2	NA, AU, EU, JP		
LittleBigPlanet	Platformer	2008	4	NA, PAL, JP		
PlayStation All-Stars Battle Royale	Fighting, Action, Platform	2012	4	NA, EU, AUS, JP		
Resident Evil 5	TPS, Survival horror	2009	2	EU, JP, NA, AUS		
Resistance: Fall of Man	FPS	2006	4	EU, JP, NA		
Twisted Metal (2012 video game)	Simulation, Vehicle, Combat	2012	4	NA, AU, EU		
Minecraft	Open world, Sandbox	2013	4	NA, AU, EU, US		

== PlayStation 4 ==
Title	Genre(s)	Year	Players	Available	Notes	Source
Diablo 3	Action role-playing, hack and slash	2014	4	WW		
Broforce	Run-and-gun platform	2016	4	WW		
Minecraft	Adventure	2014	4	WW		
Rocket League	Sports	2015	4	WW		
Outward	Survival, RPG	2019	2	WW		

== PlayStation 5 ==
Title	Genre(s)	Year	Players	Available	Notes	Source
It Takes Two	Platform	2021	2	WW		
Outward	Survival, RPG	2019	2	WW		

== Super Nintendo Entertainment System ==
Title	Genre(s)	Year	Players	Multitap	Available	Notes	Source
Secret of Mana / Seiken Densetsu 2	Action RPG	1993	3	Yes	JP, NA, PAL		

== Wii ==
Title	Genre(s)	Year	Players	Available	GC Controller Support	Classic Controller Support	Notes	Source
007: Quantum of Solace	FPS	2008	4	NA, EU, AUS, JP	No	No		
Conduit 2	FPS	2011	4	NA, EU	No	Yes		
Dokapon Kingdom	Party	2008	4	JP, NA, EU	Yes	No		
Dragon Ball Z Budokai Tenkaichi 3	Fighting	2007	2	JP, NA, EU	Yes	Yes		
GoldenEye 007	FPS	2010	4	NA, EU, AUS	Yes	Yes		
Mario Kart Wii	Racing	2008	4	JP, EU, AUS, NA	Yes	Yes		
Mario Party 8	Party	2007	4	NA, EU, AUS, JP	No	No		
Mario Party 9	Party	2012	4	EU, AUS, NA, JP	No	No		
Medal of Honor: Vanguard	FPS	2007	4	NA, EU, AUS	No	No		
Sonic & Sega All-Stars Racing	Racing	2010	4	NA, EU, AUS	No	Yes		
Super Smash Bros. Brawl	Fighting, Action	2008	4	JP, NA, AUS, EU	Yes	Yes	Co-op: 2 players, Versus: 4 players	
New Super Mario Bros. Wii	Platformer	2009	4	JP, NA, AUS, EU	Yes	Yes		
Western Heroes	Action	2010	4					

== Wii U ==
Title	Genre(s)	Year	Players	Available	Wiimote Support	Wiimote + Nunchuk Support	Classic Controller Support	Wii U Pro Controller Support	Notes	Source
Donkey Kong Country: Tropical Freeze	Platformer	2014	2	JP, NA, EU, AUS	Yes	Yes	No	Yes		
Mario Kart 8	Racing	2014	4	JP, NA, EU, AUS	Yes	Yes	Yes	Yes		
Mario Party 10	Party	2015	5	JP, NA, EU, AUS	Yes	No	No	No		
New Super Mario Bros. U	Platform	2012	5	NA, PAL, JP	Yes	No	No	No		
Nintendo Land	Party	2012	5	NA, PAL, JP	Yes	Yes	No	No		
Rayman Legends	Platformer	2013	5	AUS, EU, NA	Yes	Yes	Yes	Yes		
Runbow	Platformer, racing	2015	9	JP, NA, EU, AUS	Yes	Yes	Yes	Yes		
Sonic & All-Stars Racing Transformed	Racing	2012	5	NA, EU, JP	Yes	Yes	Yes	Yes		
Super Mario 3D World	Platformer	2013	4	JP, NA, EU, AUS	Yes	Yes	Yes	Yes		
Super Smash Bros. for Wii U	Fighting	2014	8	JP, NA, EU, AUS	Yes	Yes	Yes	Yes	GameCube Controller compatible using GameCube Controller Adapter	
Tekken Tag Tournament 2	Fighting	2012	4	NA, EU, AUS, JP	Yes	No	Yes	Yes		
The Wonderful 101	Action, Adventure	2013	5	EU, JP, NA, AUS	No	No	Yes	Yes		
Wii Party U	Party	2013	4	NA, EU, AUS, JP	Yes	No	No	No		

== Xbox ==
Title	Genre(s)	Year	Players	Available	Notes	Source
Combat: Task Force 121	FPS	2005	4	NA, EU		
Flatout	Racing	2005	8	NA, EU	Split screen: 4 players, Hot seat: 8 players	
Flatout 2	Racing	2006	8	NA, EU	Split screen: 2 players, Hot seat: 8 players	
Halo: Combat Evolved	FPS	2001	4	NA, EU, AUS, JP	Campaign: 2 players, Multiplayer: 4 players	
Halo 2	FPS	2004	4	NA, EU, AUS, JP	Campaign: 2 players, Multiplayer: 4 players	
Medal of Honor: European Assault	FPS	2005	4	NA, EU		
Medal of Honor: Frontline	FPS	2002	4	NA, EU		
Medal of Honor: Rising Sun	FPS	2003	4	NA, EU	Campaign: 2 players, Multiplayer: 4 players	
World War II Combat: Road to Berlin	FPS	2006	4	NA		
World War II Combat: Iwo Jima	FPS	2006	4	NA		

== Xbox 360 ==
Title	Genre(s)	Year	Players	Available	Notes	Source
Blur	Racing	2010	4	NA, EU		
Call of Duty 4: Modern Warfare	FPS	2007	4	NA, EU, AUS		
Call of Duty: Advanced Warfare	FPS	2014	2	WW		
Call of Duty: Black Ops	FPS	2010	4	WW	Zombies: 2 players, Multiplayer: 4 players	
Call of Duty: Black Ops II	FPS	2012	4	WW		
Call of Duty: Ghosts	FPS	2013	2	WW		
Call of Duty: Modern Warfare 2	FPS	2009	4	WW	Special Ops: 2 players, Multiplayer: 4 players	
Call of Duty: Modern Warfare 3	FPS	2011	4	WW	Special Ops: 2 players, Multiplayer: 4 players	
Call of Duty: World at War	FPS	2008	4	NA, EU, AU	Campaign: 2 players, Nazi Zombies: 2 players, Multiplayer: 4 players	
Gears of War	TPS	2006	2	US, EU, AUS, KO, JP		
Gears of War 2	TPS	2008	2	US, EU, AUS, KO, JP		
Gears of War 3	TPS	2011	2	US, EU, AUS, SA, KO, JP		
Gears of War: Judgment	TPS	2013	2	WW		
Halo: Combat Evolved Anniversary	FPS	2011	4	WW	Campaign: 2 players, Halo: Reach Anniversary Multiplayer: 4 players	
Injustice: Gods Among Us	Fighting	2013	2	NA, EU, AUS		
Left 4 Dead	FPS, Survival horror	2008	2	NA, EU, AUS		
Left 4 Dead 2	FPS, Survival horror	2009	2	NA, EU		
Minecraft	Adventure	2012	4	WW		
Mortal Kombat	Fighting	2011	4	NA, EU, AUS		
Need for Speed: Most Wanted	Racing	2005	2	NA, EU		
Rio	Party	2011	4	NA, EU, AUS, AS		
Tekken Tag Tournament 2	Fighting	2012	4	WW		

== Xbox One ==
Title	Genre(s)	Year	Players	Available	Notes	Source
Halo: The Master Chief Collection	FPS	2014	4	WW		
Minecraft	Adventure	2014	4	WW		

== Additional information ==
Data about local multiplayer functionality in games is highly underreported, so all datasets are incomplete and don't take into consideration retro and indie games that would have a considerable impact on the results.

That said, according to the dataset gathered by the website Co-optimus (also incomplete but with more than 1000 games), there's a clear peak in local multiplayer games around the 7° generation of consoles coinciding with the popularization of online multiplayer games on consoles like the PS3 and Xbox 360.

Local Multiplayer Games Throughout the Years

== Legend ==
Availability	Explanation
^{AS}	Asia
^{AUS}	Australasia
^{BRA}	Brazil
^{EU}	European Union Russia Switzerland Norway
^{JP}	Japan
^{KO}	Republic of Korea
^{NA}	North America
^{PAL}	PAL system
^{SA}	South America
^{WW}	World Wide

== See also ==
- List of Wii games
- List of GameCube games
