= List of Sega Pico games =

This is a list of released games for the Sega Pico video game console. The list is sorted by games alphabetically along with their developer and publisher.
An additional list of games released for the system's successor, Advanced Pico Beena, is also provided.

As of January 2015, the total number of games released for the console is unknown, however, over 300 games were released for it.

== Games ==
There are 256 (Note: This number is always up to date by this script.) games on this list.

Title	Developer	Publisher	Year
6000-nin no Sensei-tachi ga Tsukutta Tanoshii Shougakkou Tanken 1	Sega	Sega	JP: September 30, 1999 January 1, 2001 (Re-release)
6000-nin no Sensei-tachi ga Tsukutta Tanoshii Shougakkou Tanken 2	Sega Toys	Sega Toys	JP: June 18, 1999
A Year at Pooh Corner	Novotrade	Sega	JP: July 26, 1993; NA: November 15, 1994; EU: December 31, 1994; BR: September 18, 1994; KR: October 2, 1997
Adventures in Letterland with Jack & Jill	Thinking Cap	Thinking Cap	NA: September 10, 1995; KR: June 23, 1996
Aendiwa Billieui Suhaktamheom	Samsung	Samsung	KR: March 12, 1997
Ai to Yume no Kuni Sanrio Puroland Asobinagara Oboeyou! Hiragana Katakana	Sega	Sega	JP: August 2, 1997
Ai to Yume no Kuni Sanrio Puroland Chanto Dekirukana Minna to Tanoshii o-Yuugikai	Sega	Sega	JP: May 1, 1998
Ai to Yume to Bouken Sanrio Puroland!	Sega	Sega	JP: October 18, 1994
Allowa Pongka		Samsung	KR: November 15, 1999
Anpanman no Hajimete Mouse Pico: Anpanman to PC Renshuu!	Fupac	Sega	JP: January 24, 2002
Anpanman Pico: Waku Waku Pan Koujou	Fupac	Bandai	JP: June, 2001
Anpanman to Chinou Up!	Gakken	Gakken	JP: September, 2002
Ashita no Nadja	Bandai	Bandai	JP: March 12, 2003
B-Fighter Kabuto	Bandai	Bandai	JP: May 15, 1996
B-Robo Kabutack	Bandai	Bandai	JP: July 10, 1997
Bakuryuu Sentai Abaranger	Bandai	Bandai	JP: April 1, 2003
The Berenstain Bears: A School Day	Sega	Sega	NA: February 20, 1995; EU: November 15, 1995; KR: January 1, 1997
Bioneun Nal	Samsung	Samsung	KR: 1996
Bishoujo Senshi Sailor Moon SuperS	Bandai	Bandai	JP: October 19, 1995
Bishoujo Senshi Sailor Moon S	Bandai	Bandai	JP: July 20, 1994
Bishoujou Senshi Sailor Moon Sailor Stars: Tokimeki Party	Bandai	Bandai	JP: August 9, 1996
A Bug's Life	Sega	Sega	JP: December 31, 1999; KR: March 12, 2000
Chibi Maruko-chan Issho ni Asobou yo		Takara	JP: July 25, 1995
Choukou Senshi Changerion	Sega	Sega	JP: May 1, 1996
Cooking Pico: Minna to Issho ni Hajimete Cooking!	Sega	Sega	JP: July 25, 1999
Copera no Chikyuu Daisuki	Yamaha	Yamaha	JP: November 15, 1998
Copera no Koto Otona Ani	Yamaha	Yamaha	JP: May 15, 1994
Copera no Time Machine	Yamaha	Yamaha	JP: October 3, 1993
Crayola Crayons: Create a World	Sega	Sega	NA: August 2, 1995; KR: November 19, 1998
Crayon Shin-chan no Ora to Ishho ni Asobou yo!	Bandai	Bandai	JP: March 1, 1994
Crayon Shin-chan no Oekaki Note	Bandai	Bandi	JP: January 1, 1995
Cutey Honey Flash	Bandai	Bandai	JP: June 19, 1997
Dance Pico: Hashitte Odotte Chou Happy!	Sega	Sega	JP: February, 2003
Denji Sentai Megaranger	Bandai	Bandai	JP: July 26, 1997
Densha Daishuugou	Sega	Sega Yonezawa	JP: January 1, 1996
Disney Princess Suteki ni Lesson! Hiragana Katakana	Sega Toys	Sega Toys	JP: October 18, 2004
Disney Princesses: Ariel	Sega Toys	Sega Toys	JP: April 26, 2004
Disney Princesses: Princess ni Naritai!	Sega Toys	Sega Toys	JP: December 9, 2003
Disney's The Lion King: Adventures at Pride Rock	Sega	Sega	NA: May 13, 1995; EU: August 2, 1995; BR: February 24, 1996; KR: January 1, 1997
Disney's Pocahantas Riverbend Adventures	Realtime Associates, Disney Interactive	Sega	US: 1995; EU: 1995; DE: 1995; BR: February 1995
Do Re Mi Fa Densetsu	Yamaha	Yamaha	JP: December, 1993
Donald no Obake Taiji	Sega	Sega	JP: July 26, 1993 April 25, 1998 (Hajimema Series re-release); DE: October 14, 1995 (Cancelled)
Donald no TV Show	Sega	Sega	JP: December 15, 1995
Doraemon no Utatte Pico: Issho ni Utaou! Doraemon Waku Waku Karaoke	Sega	Sega	JP: 1998
Doraemon: Chiiku Asobi Doraland	Shogakukan	Shogakukan	JP: July 18, 2003
Doraemon: Eigo de Asobou ABC	Shogakukan	Shogakukan	JP: July 10, 2002
Doraemon: Ensoku-Imohori-Undoukai	Shogakukan	Shogakukan	JP: September 12, 1997 September 18, 2003 (10th Anniversary re-release)
Doraemon: Kazoete-Kanzan Kazu Tokei	Shogakukan	Shogakukan	JP: September 14, 2001
Doraemon: Nobita no Machinaka Doki Doki Tanken!	Shogakukan	Shogakukan	JP: May 1, 1994 August 1, 2003 (10th Anniversary re-release); TW: January 1, 1999
Doraemon: Nobita to Maigo no Kyouryuu	Shogakukan	Shogakukan	JP: March 12, 1993
Doraemon: Time Machine de Daibouken!	Shogakukan	Shogakukan	JP: October 27, 1995
Doraemon: Yometa yo-Kaketa yo Hiragana Katakana	Shogakukan	Shogakukan	JP: August 31, 1999
Doraemon: Youchien wa Tanoshii na	Shogakukan	Shogakukan	JP: May 15, 1997 February 13, 2004 (Best Selection re-release)
Doubutsu Pico: Hamster Land	Bandai	Arc System Works	JP: March 15, 2003
Drive Pico: Go Go! Car Navi Touring!	Sega	Sega	JP: June 20, 2003
ECC Junior no Hajimete Eigo Vol. 1 Patty-chan Family	Sega	Sega	JP: March 7, 2002
ECC Junior no Hajimete Eigo Vol. 2 Patty-chan no Picnic	Sega	Sega	JP: March 7, 2002
ECC Junior no Hajimete Eigo Vol. 3 Patty-chan no o-Tanjoubi	Sega	Sega	JP: March 7, 2002
ECC Junior no Hajimete Eigo Vol. 4 Doubutsu Daisuki, Patty-chan	Sega	Sega	JP: March 7, 2002
ECC Junior no Hajimete Eigo Vol. 5 Merry Christmas, Patty-chan	Sega	Sega	JP: March 7, 2002
ECC Junior no Hajimete Eigo Vol. 6 Patty-chan Yuuenchi ni Iku	Sega	Sega	JP: March 7, 2002
Ecco Jr. and the Great Ocean Treasure Hunt!	Sega	Sega	JP: October 31, 1995; NA: August 2, 1994; EU: January 1, 1995; BR: December 18, 1994; KR: December 31, 1994
Exciting! Hataraku Norimono-tachi!!	Sega	Sega	JP: October, 1997
Fishing Pico: Donald no Adventure Fishing	Sega	Sega	JP: 2000
Futari wa Pretty Cure	Bandai	Bandai	JP: June, 2004
Gabutcho Challenge Fishing	Sega	Sega	JP: January, 1998
Gakken Hajimete no Moji-Kotoba	Gakken	Gakken	JP: December, 2000
Gakken no o-Benkyou Soft Eigo ABC	Gakken	Gakken	JP: August, 1996
Gakken no o-Benkyou Soft Hiragana	Gakken	Gakken	JP: September, 1995
Gakken no o-Benkyou Soft Kakezan Kuku	Gakken	Gakken	JP: 1995
Gakken no o-Benkyou Soft Kanji	Gakken	Gakken	JP: December, 1994
Gakken no o-Benkyou Soft Kazu-Suuji	Gakken	Gakken	JP: 1995
Gakken no o-Benkyou Soft Tashizan Hikizan	Gakken	Gakken	JP: 1995
Gakken Pico de Gakushuu 1-nensei	Gakken	Gakken	JP: 2002
Gakken Pico de Kagaku 1 Hakken Mushi no Himitsu	Gakken	Gakken	JP: 2001
Ganbare! Bokura no Compati Heroes	Banpresto	Banpresto	JP: April, 1996
Gegege no Kitarō	Bandai	Bandai	JP: July, 1996
Gekisō Sentai Carranger	Bandai	Bandai	JP: April 3, 1996
Geumdokki Eundokki			
Go! Go! Konii-chan! Doki Doki World	Bandai	Bandai	JP: January, 1997
Godzilla: Doki Doki Kaijuu-tou!	Sega	Sega	JP: July 25, 1995
The Great Counting Caper with The 3 Blind Mice	Realtime Associates	Thinking Cap Software	NA: July, 1995
Gu~chokorantan Minna de Oekaki ! Tanoshii Asobi mo ippai!	NHK	Sega	JP: 2001
Hajimete Asobu Pico Soft: Anpanman no Iro-Kazu-Katachi	Fupac	Sega	JP: 2001
Hataraku Kuruma Diapet Daishuugou	Sega	Sega	JP: September 25, 1995
Heisei Kyouiku Iinkai Jr. Mezase Yuutousei	SPS	Imagineer	JP: December, 1995
Heisei Tensai Bakabon Minna de Family Restaurant ni Iku no da!	General Entertainment	General Entertainment	JP: February, 1995
Hello Kitty no Suteki na o-Tanjoubi	Sega	Sega	JP: 1997
Hello Kitty no Tanoshii Butoukai	Sega	Sega	JP: June 26, 1993
Hello Kitty no Tanoshii o-Mise-ya-san	Atlus	Sega	JP: 2002
Hello Kitty to McDonald de Asobo!	Sega	Sega	JP: 2001
Hirake! Ponkikki Party o Hirakou!	Sega	Sega	JP: June, 1993
Issho ni Hashirou Kikansha Thomas	Bandai	Bandai	JP: 2004
Issho ni Pico: Itsudemo Issho Doraemon	Fupac	Sega	JP: December 23, 1999
Jeulgeoun Deuraibeu			
Jidou Eiken Taiou Soft Moomin to Eigo Tanjoubi no Okurimono	Obunsha	Obunsha	JP: June 24, 1995
Kaitou Saint Tail: Saint Tail to One, Two, Three!	Sega	Sega	JP: December, 1995
Kamen Rider 555	Bandai	Bandai	JP: May 1, 2003
Kamen Rider Agito & Kuuga Wild Battle	Bandai	Bandai	JP: April 1, 2001
Kangofu-san Pico: Yasashiku o-Teate Pico Clinic!	Sega	Sega	JP: April, 2001
Kawaii Nakama o Sodateyou-tsu no Shippo	Sega	Sega	JP: 1998
Kerokero Keroppi no Harikiri Undoukai	Sega	Sega	JP: 1993
Keyboard Pico: Kantan Waku Waku Keyboard	Sega	Sega	JP: 1997
Keyboard Pico 2: Sawattemiyou! Yoiko no Hajimete Keyboard	Sega	Sega	JP: 1997
Kikansha Thomas ni Notte	Bandai	Bandai	JP: March, 1995
Kiki & Rara: Hoshi no Kazu Asobi	Sega	Sega	JP: September 12, 2003
Kiteretsu Daihyakka Edo ni Itte Kiteretsu Sai-sama ni Au Nari	Sega	Sega	JP: 1994
Kitty to Minna no Keyboard Pico: Kitty to Minna no Hajimete Keyboard	Sega	Sega	JP: April, 2004
Konbini de o-Kaimono!	Sega	Sega	JP: 2001
Kosume Pico Motto Kawaiku Naritai na	Sega	Sega	JP: June, 2002
Kouchuu Ouja Mushiking: Atsumete Asobou Kouchuu Zukan	Sega	Sega	JP: 2005
Kuma no Pooh-san Christopher Robin wo Sagase!	Kodansha	Kodansha	JP: April, 1999
Kuma no Pooh-san Tanoshii Tashizan Hikizan	Gakken	Gakken	JP: March 11, 2004
Kumon no Sukusuku Lesson 1-kara 30-made no Suuji	Pre Stage	KUMON	JP: 2001
Kumon no Sukusuku Lesson Hajimete no Hiragana	Pre Stage	KUMON	JP: January 24, 2002
Lego Fun to Build	Sega	Sega	JP: 1995
Licca-chan ni Naritai!	Sega	Sega	JP: October, 2001
Magic Crayons	Sega	Sega	NA: June 19, 1994; EU: July 10, 1994
Magic Knight Rayearth: Magic Knight Tanjou	Sega	Sega	JP: October 27, 1995
Math Antics with Disney's 101 Dalmatians	Appaloosa Interactive	Sega	NA: 1996; JP: 1997
McDonald's de Asobo!	Sega	Sega	JP: July 15, 1999
Melody Land	Yamaha	Yamaha	JP: December, 1993
Mezase Pro Yakyuu	Sega	Sega	JP: 1995
Mickey no Boku wa Meitantei	Kodansha	Kodansha	JP: February, 2000
Mickey no Tokyo Disneyland Stamp Rally	Kodansha	Kodansha	JP: August, 1996
Mickey no Yukai na Bouken	Sega	Sega	JP: June 26, 1993
Mickey to Ooki na Furudokei	Sega	Sega	JP: April, 1995
Mickey to Utau Tori no Shima Minnie o Sagashite Waku Waku Daibouken!	Kodansha	Kodansha	JP: July, 1998
Mickey's Blast Into the Past	Sega	Sega	NA: August 2, 1994; EU: January 15, 1995
Miimi to Taata no Waiwai Oekaki Doubutsuen	Sega	Sega	JP: 1993
Mike to Asobou Tobidase Milky Way	Yamaha	Yamaha	JP: 1994
MiniMoni. Eigo de Asobundapyon!	Sega	Sega	JP: March, 2003
MiniMoni. Shougakkou e Ikundapyon!	Sega	Sega	JP: March, 2003
MiniMoni. TV ni Derundapyon!	Sega	Sega	JP: June 13, 2002
Minna de Odorou: Oz no Mahoutsukai	Westone	Sega	JP: June, 1996
Mo~tto! Ojamajo Doremi	Fupac	Bandai	JP: June, 2001
Moero! Robokon: Oekaki Robokon!!	Bandai	Bandai	JP: 1999
Moshi Moshi Pico: Dare ga Deru kana Moshi Moshi Pico de TV to o-Shaberi!	Sega	Sega	JP: 1997
The Muppets On The Go!	Climax	Sega	US: March, 1996
Musical Zoo (In Japan known as) Do Re Me Fa Animals no Tanoshii Ensoukai (ドレミファアニマルズの たのしいえんそうかい)	Sega	Sega	JP: 1994; US: January 1995
My Grandfather's Farm	Climax	Sega	KR: 1996
NHK o-Kaasan to Issho Do Re Mi Fa Do~nuts! Asobi Ippai Uta Ippai!	Bandai	Bandai	JP: April, 1995
NHK o-Kaasan to Issho Do Re Mi Fa Do~nuts! Oekaki Daaisuki! Omoshiro Oekaki Daishuugou!	Bandai	Bandai	JP: 1998
NHK o-Kaasan to Issho Genki na Ko Atsumare!	Bandai	Bandai	JP: November 25, 1995
Ninja Sentai Hurricanger & Hyakujuu Sentai Gaoranger Chou Sentai Super Battle	Bandai	Bandai	JP: February 1, 2002
Ninja Sentai Kakuranger	Bandai	Bandai	
Ninpuu Sentai Hurricanger & Hyakujuu Sentai Gaoranger Chou Sentai Super Battle	Arc System Works	Bandai	JP: April, 2002
Nintama Rantarou	Bandai	Bandai	JP: March, 1996
Norimono Studio Go Go! Noristar Asobi Macho!	Shogakukan	Shogakukan	JP: November, 2002
Nurie Daisuki! Dumbo no Waku Waku Circus!	Sega	Sega	JP: February, 1997
O-Ryouri Daisuki! Kitchen Pico	Sega	Sega	JP: July 18, 2003
O-Sewa Shimasho! Akachan Pico	Sega	Sega	JP: July 1, 2002
Ojamajo Doremi #	Fupac	Bandai	JP: March, 2000
Ojamajo Doremi Dokka~n!	Fupac	Bandai	JP: May, 2002
Ojarumaru	Bandai	Bandai	JP: September, 1999
Ongaku Daisuki Snoopy	Sega	Sega	JP: 1996
Oshare no Kuni no Alice	Yamaha	Yamaha	
Oshare Pico: Suteki ni Henshin! Runa-chan no Oshare Hair Salon	Sega	Sega	JP: August, 2000
Otto Katachitchi	Yamaha	Yamaha	
Ougon Yuusha Goldran Himitsu Daihyakka	Takara	Takara	JP: August 25, 1995
Outa no Canvas	Yamaha	Yamaha	
Packet 2: Yukai na Nakama to Game de Kazuasobi	Sega	Sega	JP: October, 1997
Paddington no Sekai Ryokou	Sega	Sega	JP: May, 1996
PC Setsuzoku Kit Pico Town ni Dekakeyou!	Sega	Sega	JP: June 1, 2001
Pekora no Daibouken Maboroshi no Ice Cream o Sagase!	Sega	Sega	JP: 1998
Pepe's Puzzles	Sega	Sega	US: March, 1995
Pet to Issho ni Tanoshiku Asobo♪ PC Pico	Sega	Sega	JP: August, 2004
Petapeta Chokkin Asoberu Zukan ~Doubutsu~	Sega	Sega	JP: November, 1995
Peter Pan Neverland e Ikou!	Sega	Sega	JP: September, 1997
Pico Soccer Mezase Soccer Senshu	Sega	Sega	JP: 1995
Plarail Pico: Plarail de Asobou!	Sega	Sega	JP: September 21, 2001
Pocket Monsters Advanced Generation Minna de Pico Pokémon Waiwai Battle!	Sega	Sega	JP: July 13, 2004
Pocket Monsters Advanced Generation: Hiragana Katakana Kakechatta!	Sega	Sega	JP: November 17, 2003
Pocket Monsters: Suuji o Tsukamaeyou!	Sega Toys	Sega	JP: July 23, 2002
Pooh-san no Hajimete no Eigo	Kodansha	Kodansha	JP: January, 2001
Pooh-san no Ichinichi	Sega	Sega	JP: 1995
Professor Pico and the Paintbox Puzzle	Sega	Sega	EU: March 12, 1999
Quiz ni Challenge! Doraemon	Sega	Sega	JP: 1995
Race ni Deyou yo! Ken-chan to Pepe: Boku no Kuruma de Daibouken	Sega	Sega	JP: 1996
Rhythm Pico: Pippi-chan to Rhythm Asobi	Sega	Sega	JP: 1999
Richard Scarry's Huckle and Lowly's Busiest Day Ever.	Sega	Sega	USA: 1994; UK: 1994; FRA: 1994; ESP: 1994; ITA: 1994; JPN: October 31, 1995
Saa Shuppatsu da! Ken-chan to Pepe no Wanpaku Drive	Sega	Sega	JP: April, 1996
Sanchoume no Tama: Momo-chan wa Doko!	Bandai	Bandai	JP: July 10, 1994
Sanou Kaihatsu Series 1 Zukei Ninshiki	Imagineer	Imagineer	JP: August 31, 1995
Sanou Kaihatsu Series 2 Suuryou - Keisan	Imagineer	Imagineer	JP: October 2, 1995
Sanou Kaihatsu Series 3 Hikaku - Bunrui	Imagineer	Imagineer	JP: October 2, 1995
Sanou Kaihatsu Series 4 Suiri - Kousei	Imagineer	Imagineer	JP: December 8, 1995
Sanou Kaihatsu Series 5 Meiro - Kioku	Imagineer	Imagineer	JP: 1995
Sanou Kaihatsu Series 6 Ouyou Mondai	Imagineer	Imagineer	JP: 1995
Sanrio Festival Tanoshii Card-dzukuri	Sega	Sega	JP: November 30, 1995
Sanrio Puroland de Dance Carnival: Minna de o-Ryouri o-Saihou	Sega	Sega	JP: October 27, 1995
Satonaka Machiko no Tanoshii Origami	Nayuta Studio	Nayuta Studio	JP: November, 1995
Scholastic's The Magic School Bus Going Places	Novotrade	Sega	NA: February 24, 1995
Sekai Meisaku Gekijou	Sega	Sega	JP: July 25, 1995
Sesame Street: Alphabet Avenue	Appaloosa Interactive	Sega	US: June, 1997
Shichida Makoto Kanshuu Unou Image Training Hiragana Katakana Casino de Moja Vegas Dream!	Pony Canyon	Pony Canyon	JP: April, 2000
Shichida Makoto Kanshuu Unou Image Training: Sansuu Eigo de Mojars ni Chousen	Pony Canon	Pony Canon	JP: 2004
Shimajirou to Yume no Kuni e Daibouken!	Sega	Sega	JP: October, 2002
Shimashimatora no Shimajirou Tanoshii Ichinichi	Sega	Sega	JP: June, 2000
Shin Ultra Hero	Bandai	Bandai	JP: September, 1998
Shin Ultraman Pico Ultra Fighting Base	Bandai	Bandai	JP: October, 2001
Shinseiki Ultraman Densetsu	Bandai	Bandai	JP: September, 2002
Shirayuki-hime	Sega	Sega	JP: September, 1999
Smart Alex and Smart Alice: Curious Kids	Novatrade	Sega	US: 1995; EU: 1995
Snoopy no Gakugeikai	Sega	Sega	JP: October 27, 1995
Sodatete Manabu Doubutsu Oukoku!	Sega	Sega	JP: August, 1996
Sonic the Hedgehog's Gameworld	Aspect	Sega	JP: August 2, 1994; NA: November 19, 1996
Soreike! Anpanman Eigo to Nakayoshi 2 Tanoshii Carnival	Sega	Sega	JP: 1995
Soreike! Anpanman Eigo to Nakayoshi Youchien de ABC	Sega	Sega	JP: 1995
Soreike! Anpanman no Game de Asobou Anpanman	Bandai	Bandai	JP: 1994
Soreike! Anpanman no Medalympic World	Bandai	Bandai	JP: November 17, 1995
Soreike! Anpanman no Medalympic World 2	Bandai	Bandai	JP: July, 1999
Soreike! Anpanman no Minna de Kyousou Anpanman!	Bandai	Bandai	JP: 1995
Soreike! Anpanman no o-Hanashi Daisuki Anpanman	Bandai	Bandai	JP: November, 1994
Soreike! Anpanman: Anpanman no Chie no World	Bandai	Bandai	JP: July 18, 2003
Soreike! Anpanman: Anpanman to Denwa de Asobou!	Bandai	Bandai	JP: December, 1997
Soreike! Anpanman: Anpanman no Hitori de Dekichatta!	Sega	Sega	JP: February 5, 2005
Soreike! Anpanman: Anpanman to Kotoba Asobi	Sega	Sega	JP: 1998
Soreike! Anpanman: Anpanman to Suuji Asobi	Sega	Sega	JP: September, 2000
Soreike! Anpanman: Anpanman to Tanoshii Drive!	Bandai	Bandai	JP: 1998
Space Pico: Uchuu Bouken Space Shuttle Pilot	Sega	Sega	JP: 1998
Susie-chan to Marvy: o-Tetsudai Da~isuki!	Sega	Sega	JP: October, 2000
Sylvanian Families Mori no Nakama to Tanoshii o-Tanjoubikai	Sega	Sega	JP: December, 2000
Tails and the Music Maker	Novotrade	Sega	NA: October 4, 1994; EU: December 5, 1995
Tanoshiku Asonde Nouryoku Up! Tanoshii Youchien	Bandai	Bandai	JP: November 15, 1994
Tanoshiku Asonde Nouryoku Up! Tanoshii Youchien '95-nendoban	Bandai	Bandai	JP: April 3, 1995
Tinga-wa Haenggo-eui Toongtang Toongtang Doshi			
Tokusou Sentai Dekaranger	Bandai	Bandai	JP: June 23, 2004
Tokyo Disneyland Toon Town Mickey no Boku wa Untenshu	Kodansha	Kodansha	JP: August, 1997
Tokyo DisneySea Mickey to Asobou!	Kodansha	Kodansha	JP: October, 2002
Tomica Pico: Bokura no Machi Tomica Town de Asobou!	Sega	Sega	JP: July, 1997
Tomica Pico: Rescue Parking	Sega	Sega	JP: July, 2002
Tottoko Hamtarou Haru Natsu Aki Fuyu Tottoko Nakayoshi! Ham-chans!	Sega	Sega	JP: December, 2001
Tottoko Hamtarou: Oekaki Ippai! Ham-chans!	Shogakukan	Shogakukan	JP: October, 2002
Tottoko Hamtarou: Tottoko Tanoshiku Aiueo: Maboroshi no Hikaru Tane o Mitsukeru no Dah!	Sega	Sega	JP: May 14, 2004
Toy Story 2 Woody Sousaku Daisakusen!!	Sega	Sega	JP: August, 2000
Uchuu de Asobou! Baabapapa no Uchuu Ryokou	Sega	Sega	JP: 1996
Ultra Hero	Bandai	Bandai	JP: July, 1995
Ultraman Dyna	Bandai	Bandai	JP: January, 1998
Ultraman Kids Tobidase! Space Picnic	General Entertainment	General Entertainment	JP: November, 1995
Ultraman Pico Ultra Fighting Base	Bandai	Bandai	JP: September, 2000
Ultraman Tiga	Bandai	Bandai	JP: March, 1997
Ultraman vs. Kaijuu Gundan!!	Bandai	Bandai	JP: September, 1994
Unou Kaihatsu Series 3 Hello Kitty no Machi e o-Dekake	Imagineer	Imagineer	JP: October 31, 1995
Unou Kaihatsu Series 4 Kerokero Keroppi no Iro Katachi	Imagineer	Imagineer	JP: 1995
Unou Kaihatsu Series 5 Hello Kitty no Suteki na Takaramono	Imagineer	Imagineer	JP: 1995
Unou Kaihatsu Series 6 Ahiru no Pekkuru no Kazoetemiyou	Imagineer	Imagineer	JP: 1995
Unou Kaihatsu Series 8 Dracky no Oekaki House	Imagineer	Imagineer	JP: 1995
Unou Kaihatsu Series 9 Nihon Mukashibanashi	Imagineer	Imagineer	JP: December 5, 1995
Unou Kaihatsu Series 10 Nontan to Issho Waiwai Nippon	SPS	Imagineer	JP: 1996
Unou Kaihatsu Series 11 Heisei Kyouiku Iinkai Jr.	Iamgineer	Imagineer	JP: 1996
Unten Thomas Deluxe Set	Bandai	Bandai	JP: April, 2000
Utatte Pico: Minna de Karaoke! Issho ni Utaou Suki na Uta!	Sega	Sega	JP: September, 1997
Yobeba Kotaeru Doraemon: Nobita to Himitsu Dougu o Mitsukeyou!	Sega	Sega	JP: 1997
Yukai na Mori no Packet	Sega	Sega	JP: December, 1995
Yume no Crayon Oukoku	Bandai	Bandai	JP: February, 1998

== Advanced Pico Beena games ==
There are 64 games on this list.

Title	Developer	Publisher	Year
1-nichi 10-pun de E ga Jouzu ni Kakeru Beena	Sega	Sega	JP: February 28, 2008
Anpanman no Waku Waku Game Oekaki	Sega	Sega	JP: July 17, 2007
Anpanman o Sagase!	Sega	Sega	JP: February 26, 2009
Beena Town e Youkoso	Sega	Sega	JP: August 5, 2005
Cars 2 Racing Beena: Mezase! World Champion!	Sega	Sega	JP: July 28, 2011
Chiiku Drill Oshare Majo Love and Berry: Moji Kazu Chie Asobi	Sega	Sega	JP: February 17, 2007
Chiiku Drill Pocket Monsters Diamond & Pearl: Moji Kazu Chie Asobi	Sega	Sega	JP: April, 2007
Cinnamoroll: Cafe Cinnamon de o-Tetsudai	Bandai	Bandai	JP: June, 2006
Cooking Beena: o-Ryouri Dekichatta!	Sega	Sega	JP: August 11, 2007
Densha Daishuugou! Card de Asobou	Sega	Sega	JP: December 12, 2006
Disney Tanoshii o-Benkyou Series: Mic de Kantan ABC	Sega	Sega	JP: August, 2005
Disney Tanoshii Oekaki: o-Mise-ya-san o Tsukutchaou!	Sega	Sega	JP: November 15, 2007
Doraemon Chinou Daikaihatsu! Waku Waku Game Land	Sega	Sega	JP: October, 2006
Doraemon Tanoshii En Seikatsu Youchien Hoikuen	Sega	Sega	JP: March, 2006
Doraemon Tanoshiku o-Keiko Hiragana Katakana	Sega	Sega	JP: October, 2005
Doraemon Waku Waku Sekai Isshuu Game: Asonde Oboeru Chizu Kokki	Sega	Sega	JP: April 1, 2010
Engine Sentai Go-onger Mach de Oboeru! Aiueo!!	Bandai	Bandai	JP: April 24, 2008
Futari wa Pretty Cure Max Heart	Bandai	Bandai	JP: August, 2005
Futari wa Pretty Cure Splash Star	Bandai	Bandai	JP: April, 2006
Game ga Ippai Kikansha Thomas	Bandai	Bandai	JP: October, 2005
Geneki Toudai-sei ga Tsukutta! 'Dekiru Ko ni Naru Seikatsu Shuukan Dragon Sakura Youji-hen'	Sega	Sega	JP: March 3, 2007
Go! Go! Advance Drive: Muttsu no Machine ni Chousen da!'	Sega	Sega	JP: August, 2005
GoGo Sentai Boukenger Kazu to Katachi o Oboeyou!	Bandai	Bandai	JP: April 22, 2006
Hello Kitty no Hiragana Katakana o-Namae Kaitemiyou!'	Sega	Sega	JP: April 3, 2008
Issho ni Henshin Fresh Pretty Cure	Bandai	Bandai	JP: May 28, 2009
Juuken Sentai Gekiranger: Niki Niki! Kazu Katachi ni Challenge!	Bandai	Bandai	JP: July 19, 2007
Kamen Rider Kiva Hiragana Suuji Chie Battle!!	Bandai	Bandai	JP: August 7, 2008
Kazoku Minna no Nouryoku Trainer	Sega	Sega	JP: November 4, 2005
Kodai Ouja Kyouryuu King D-Kids Adventure: Dino Slash! Kyouryuu Battle!!	Sega	Sega	JP: October 25, 2007
Kouchuu Ouja Mushiking: Mori no Tami no Densetsu - Minna de Tanken! Kouchuu no Mori	Sega	Sega	JP: September, 2005
Kouchuu Ouja Mushiking: Nebu-Hakase to Kazu Katachi ni Challenge!	Sega	Sega	JP: September 9, 2006
Meet Bub: Bub to Eigo Tanken	Sega	Sega	JP: October 21, 2007
Meitantei Conan: Kanzen Suiri! Kazu to Zukei no Nazo	Sega	Sega	JP: February 11, 2006
Narumiya Mezzo Piano Oshare & Lesson	Sega	Sega	JP: February, 2006
Nihongo de Asobo	Sega	Sega	JP: August, 2006
Oden-kun: Oden Mura no Tanoshii Nakama-tachi	Sega	Sega	JP: April, 2007
Omoiyari o Hagukumu Katarikake Ehon Miffy to Asobou Utaou	Sega	Sega	JP: July 19, 2007
Oshare Beena: o-Mise de Kisekae Make Haircut	Sega	Sega	JP: July 17, 2008
Oshare Majo Love and Berry: Cute ni Oshare	Sega	Sega	JP: April, 2006
Oshare ni Henshin HeartCatch PreCure!	Bandai	Bandai	JP: July 22, 2010
Partner In TV! o-Uchi ni Wan-chan ga Yattekita	Sega	Sega	JP: August 6, 2005
Pashah to Henshin Beauty Academy	Sega	Sega	JP: November 18, 2006
Pocket Monsters Advanced Generation Pokémon Suuji Battle!!	Sega	Sega	JP: September, 2005
Pocket Monsters Best Wishes! Chinou Ikusei Pokémon Daiundoukai	Sega	Sega	JP: December 4, 2010
Pocket Monsters Diamond & Pearl Pokémon o Sagase! Meiro de Daibouken!	Sega	Sega	JP: September 17, 2009
Point Gakushuu 10-masu Keisan	Sega	Sega	JP: August, 2006
Point Gakushuu Kakijun	Sega	Sega	JP: August, 2006
Point Gakushuu Tokei	Sega	Sega	JP: August, 2006
Pururun! Shizuku-chan: Asonde Tanoshiku Nouryoku Up	Sega	Sega	JP: April, 2007
Samurai Sentai Shinkenger Battle ga Ippai! Iza Mairu!!	Bandai	Bandai	JP: April 23, 2009
Shimajirou no Eigo Activity Ehon: ABC Park de Asobou!	Sega	Sega	JP: November, 2006
Shoku Iku Series 1 Soreike! Anpanman: Sukikirai Nai Ko Genki na Ko!	Sega	Sega	JP: November, 2005
Shooting Beena Toy Story 3: Woody to Buzz no Daibouken!	Sega	Sega	JP: August 6, 2010
Soreike! Anpanman Card de Tanoshiku ABC	Sega	Sega	JP: August, 2006
Soreike! Anpanman Doki Doki! Rescue Drive: Car Navi-tsuki	Sega	Sega	JP: August, 2008
Soreike! Anpanman Hajimete Kaketa yo! Oboeta yo! Hiragana Katakana: Gojuuon Board Kinou-tsuki	Sega	Sega	JP: August 8, 2005
Soreike! Anpanman o-Mise ga Ippai! TV de o-Ryouri Tsukutchao	Sega	Sega	JP: November 12, 2009
Soreike! Anpanman Waku Waku Eigo Game!	Sega	Sega	JP: March 31, 2011
Suite PreCure: Happy Oshare Harmony	Bandai	Bandai	JP: May 26, 2011
Taiko no Tatsujin Ongaku Lesson	Bandai	Bandai	JP: April, 2007
Tensou Sentai Goseiger Super Battle Daishuugou!	Bandai	Bandai	JP: April 29, 2010
Tomica de Asobou!	Sega	Sega	JP: April, 2006
Yes! PreCure 5: Asonde Oboeyou Hiragana!	Fupac	Bandai	JP: April, 2007
Yes! PreCure 5 GoGo!: LoveLove Hiragana Lesson	Bandai	Bandai	JP: April 24, 2008

== ePico Games ==
Title	Developer	Publisher	Year
Tamagopanda no Mutyu Land ni Youkoso!: Wakuwaku Taiken Stamp Rally 100	Sega	Sega	JP: October 10, 2024
Soreike! Anpanman Hazimete Dekitayo! Oboetayo! Anpanman Hitoride Dekityatta!	Sega	Sega	JP: October 10, 2024
Disney Princesses: Magical Academy	Sega	Sega	JP: October 10, 2024
