= List of Coleco Adam games =

The Coleco Adam is a personal computer developed by Coleco from October 1983 to January 1985.

Coleco released the computer as a separate unit and as Expansion Module #3 for its ColecoVision, which would upgrade the console to make it fully compatible with the Adam. Earlier in its lifetime, the Adam suffered major defects leading to as many as 60 percent of the first batch of machines being returned. The negative publicity of the defects, along with a sluggish production rate after a late 1983 approval from the Federal Communications Commission, guaranteed dismal sales, including one missed figure in Christmas 1983 (only about 95,000 units shipped against the expected 500,000), and software developers were hesitant to support the computer. After failing to rectify its marred reputation despite repairing most of the defects, aggressive price cuts, and even a $500 scholarship program, Coleco discontinued the computer more than a year after its launch.

One advantage of the Coleco Adam is that it is inherently fully compatible with all ColecoVision titles through its cartridge slot. This list only contains games that natively support the computer and its features, which were usually released on proprietary Digital Data Pack cassette tapes. For a separate list for ColecoVision, see list of ColecoVision games. Long after its support was dropped, a community of enthusiasts continues to provide hardware and software for the machine, including homebrew games. Therefore, only games that have been noted by a publication are counted for inclusion.

== Games ==
There are 137 (Note: This number is always up to date by this script.) commercial games on this list.

List of Coleco Adam games
Name	Date	Genre	Notes	Publisher	Refs
2010: The Graphic Action Game	1984	Interactive fiction	Based on the 1984 film 2010: The Year We Make Contact	Coleco Industries	
2010: The Text Adventure Game	1984	Interactive fiction	Based on the 1984 film 2010: The Year We Make Contact	Coleco Industries	
A Christmas Adventure	Late 1984	Adventure		Bitcards, Inc.	
ADAM Bomb	1989	Puzzle		Steve Pitman Software	
ADAM Links Golf Game		Sports		Superior Software	
Addictus		Puzzle		Reedy Software	
Adult Pinball Games		Compilation, pinball	Contains nine games made with Pinball Construction Set.	Adultware	
Adventure Pack 1	1986			ADAMagic Software	
Adventure Pack 2	1986			ADAMagic Software	
Adventure Pack 3	1986			ADAMagic Software	
Adventure Pack A	1986	Compilation, adventure		ADAMagic Software	
Adventure Pack I	Mid-1984	Compilation, adventure		Victory Software	
Adventure Pack II	Mid-1984	Compilation, adventure		Victory Software	
Alcazar		Action-adventure		Telegames / Activision	
Aquattack		Shooter		Telegames / Interphase	
Arcade Action	1987			ADAMagic Software	
BallyHoo	1986			Infocom / Elliam Associates	
Battle for Castle Arandale		Adventure		Walters Software	
Best of Broderbund	January 1985	Compilation, shooter	Contains A.E. and Choplifter.	Coleco Industries	
Beyond Trek	1988			Digital Express	
Beyond Trek - Revised	1988			Digital Express	
Bible Jeopardy		Quiz		Royal Ambassador Software	
Black Gold	1984			Image MicroCorp	
Blind Date	1987			ADAMagic Software	
Bounty Hunter	Mid-1984	Adventure		Victory Software	
Brain Games	1987			ADAMagic Software	
Brainstorm		Puzzle		Steve Pitman Software	
Buck Rogers: Planet of Zoom	October 1983	Platform	The pack-in game.	Coleco Industries	
Campaign '84	Q3 1984	Simulation		Sunrise Software	
Castle Deathstone I		Adventure		Questech Computer Entertainment Software	
Castle Vampira	1987			ADAMagic Software	
Chess Champ	1988			Digital Express	
Chess Tutor I	198?			Tutor-Ware	
Chess Tutor II	198?			Tutor-Ware	
Cutthroats	1984			Infocom / Elliam Associates	
Davasan Software Tape 3: BASIC Games		Compilation		Davasan Software	
Deadline	1982			Infocom / Elliam Associates	
Diablo	1984			Image MicroCorp	
Donkey Kong	Q2 1984	Platform		Coleco Industries	
Donkey Kong Jr.	April 1984	Platform		Coleco Industries	
Dragon - The Chinese Challenge	1989			Reedy Software	
Dragon's Lair	Q4 1984	Interactive film		Coleco Industries	
Electronic Game Pack I	1985	Compilation		APE Software	
Electronic Game Pack II	1985	Compilation		APE Software	
Enchanter	1983			Infocom / Elliam Associates	
Evolution	1987			Sydney Development Corporation	
EZ Match	1989	Puzzle		The Softworks Factory	
Family Feud	1984–5	Game show		Coleco Industries	
Fantasy Gamer	May 1985	Compilation, interactive fiction	Contains two games and an adventure game creator.	Martin Consulting	
Foreplay	1988			ADAMzap Soft	
Game Pack 1	1987			ADAMagic Software	
Game Pack 2	1987			ADAMagic Software	
Game Pack 3	1987			ADAMagic Software	
Games Pack I	May 1985	Compilation	Contains three games.	Victory Software	
Ghost Zapper	1988	Action		Steve Pitman Software	
Grave Robber		Action		International Computing	
Gust Buster	Q3 1984	Action		Sunrise Software	
Infidel	1983			Infocom / Elliam Associates	
KeKeT's Labyrinth		Maze		Walters Software	
Keystone Kapers		Platform		Telegames / Activision	
Kid's TriviaPak I	1986			Mr. T Soft	
Lab Mouse	1987			Reedy Software	
Leather Goddesses of Phobos	1986			Infocom / Elliam Associates	
Mage Quest	1986			Reedy Software	
Michigana Jones		Adventure		Reedy Software	
Mind Over ADAM				Steve Pitman Software	
Mountain King	Q3 1984	Platform		Sunrise Software	
Mr. T Word Search	1988			Mr. T Soft	
Mr. T Word Search Pak I	1988		Expansion pack	Mr. T Soft	
Mystery & Yacht	1989	Compilation		A&S Software	
Party Trivia Game		Quiz		Parallel Systems	
Phrase Craze	1988			Reedy Software	
Phrase Craze - Phrase Pak I	1988		Expansion pack	Reedy Software	
Phrase Craze - Phrase Pak II	1988		Expansion pack	Reedy Software	
Pity		Board		Z-Delta Software	
Planetfall	1983			Infocom / Elliam Associates	
Plundered Hearts	1987			Infocom / Elliam Associates	
Pro Football Strategy		Sports		Murdock Games	
Quest for Quintana Roo	Q3 1984	Action-adventure		Sunrise Software	
QuikFax Quest		Quiz		Data Doctor	
Robo Thief				Steve Pitman Software	
Rolloverture	Q3 1984	Educational, music, platform		Sunrise Software	
Sacrifice to the Spider Queen		Adventure		Avimar, Inc.	
Savings & Loan	1984			Victory Software	
Search for the Ruby Chalice		Adventure		International Computing	
Seastalker	1984			Infocom / Elliam Associates	
Skiing	1986			Telegames	
SmartBASIC Bonanza	Late 1984	Compilation	A package of 15 applications. Includes eight games.	Martin Consulting	
Snack-Man & Bouncer	1986	Compilation, action	Contains two games.	Orbitware	
Sorcerer	198?			Infocom / Elliam Associates	
Space Text Adventure Game		Adventure		Walters Software	
Spellbreaker	1985			Infocom / Elliam Associates	
Stage Fright	1987			Reedy Software	
Starcross	1982			Infocom / Elliam Associates	
States Race	1990	Educational, political simulation	Contains three games in which players answer geography questions to gain votes and political power.	Hal Weber Software	
StationFall	1987			Infocom / Elliam Associates	
SteamRoller	1984			Activision	
Strategy Pack I	May 1985	Compilation, strategy	Contains four games, including Othello.	Victory Software	
Stratozap		Shooter		Allied Creative Engineers	
Strip Poker	1989			ADAMzap Soft	
Sub Raiders		Simulation		Strategic Software	
SubRoc	1984	Shooter		Coleco Industries	
Super Parrot		Puzzle		Phoenix 2000	
Suspect	1984			Infocom / Elliam Associates	
Suspended	1983			Infocom / Elliam Associates	
Temple of Apshai		Role-playing		Epyx	
The Abominable Snowman	1989	Adventure		Graftex Software	
The Adam Home Software Library	Mid-1985	Compilation	A package of 32 applications, six of which are games.	Coleco Industries	
The Billy Saga - Vol. 01	198?			Hal Weber Software	
The Billy Saga - Vol. 02	198?			Hal Weber Software	
The Black Dungeon of Midor	1988			ADAMagic Software	
The Boot Shop	198?			ADAMagic Software	
The Complete Bible Fun Series		Quiz	Contains Bible Fun I, II and III.	JP Software	
The Dam Busters		Simulation		Sydney Development Corporation	
The HitchHiker's Guide to the Galaxy	1984			Infocom / Elliam Associates	
The Reedy Entertainment Pack 1	1986			Reedy Software	
The Socializer		Adventure		Adultware	
The Stock Market Game	198?			Image MicroCorp	
The Wizard of Id's WizType	May 1985	Educational, typing		Sydney Development Corporation	
The Yolks on You	1983			20th Century Fox	
Tomb		Adventure		International Computing	
Tournament Tennis		Sports		Telegames / Imagic	
Trek	Q4 1984	Strategy		Victory Software	
TriviaPak I	1986			Mr. T Soft	
Troll's Tale		Adventure		Sierra On-Line	
U-Match-Em		Puzzle		Phoenix 2000	
Video Hustler		Sports		Coleco / Konami	
Wacky Word Games	1984–5	Word		Coleco Industries	
Wing War		Action		Telegames / Imagic	
Wishbringer	1985			Infocom / Elliam Associates	
Witness	1983			Infocom / Elliam Associates	
Word Feud	1984			Xonox, Inc.	
Zaxxon	1984	Shooter		Coleco Industries	
Zenji		Puzzle		Telegames / Activision	
Zork I - The Great Underground Empire	1983			Infocom / Elliam Associates	
Zork II - The Wizard of Frobozz	1983			Infocom / Elliam Associates	
Zork III - The Dungeon Master	1983			Infocom / Elliam Associates	

== See also ==
- List of ColecoVision games

== Sources ==
- Feinstein, Keith (1997). Foreword. Phoenix: The Fall & Rise of Videogames. By Herman, Leonard (Second ed.). Rolenta Press. ISBN 0-9643848-2-5.
- Weiss, Brett (2007). Classic Home Video Games, 1972-1984: A Complete Reference Guide. McFarland & Company. ISBN 978-0-7864-3226-4.
- Loguidice, Bill; Barton, Matt (2009). Vintage Games: An Insider Look at the History of Grand Theft Auto, Super Mario, and the Most Influential Games of All Time. Focal Press. ISBN 978-0-240-81146-8.
- Loguidice, Bill; Barton, Matt (2014). Vintage Game Consoles: An Inside Look at Apple, Atari, Commodore, Nintendo, and the Greatest Gaming Platforms of All Time. Focal Press. ISBN 978-0-415-85600-3.
