= List of video games developed in Hong Kong =

This is a list of released video and PC games that are developed in Hong Kong (香港製作的遊戲).

Date	Title	Developer	Platform	Info
1996	精武戰警AMIKA	-	PC	---
1996	CyberCity	NetFun	PC	---
??	金錢帝國 (Capitalism)	微啟軟件	PC	
?	求婚365日	GameOne	PC	---
?	魔鬼推銷員	GameOne	PC	---
?	破壞超人	-	PC	---
?	大魔王物語	GameOne	PC	---
?	公主幻想曲	火狗工房	PC	---
?	刀劍笑	展略科技	PC	---
?	中華英雄	Ace Brock Creative	PC	---
?	聖劍奇兵	Ace Brock Creative	PC	---
?	企鵝SuperGo	WTF	PC	---
?	少林足球	展略科技	PC	---
1998	Comer	Shine Studio	PC	
1999	愛神餐館	火狗工房	PC, Xbox	---
2000	馬場風雲	GameOne	PC	---
2001	馬場大亨	Forenew Technology	PC	---
2001	永恒传说	GameOne	PC	---
2004	戀愛爆棚	CSoft	PC	---
2005	無間道Online	GameCyber	PC	---
2005	魔法師的密碼	Chronoteam	PC	
2006	小鬥士大冒險	Ric 3	PC	---
2007	鈦神	CreDeOne	PC	---
2008	鈦神2	CreDeOne	PC	
2010	鋼甲機神	CreDeOne	PC	
2011	烽火戰車	CreDeOne	PC	
2022	Rev to Vertex	PLUTONIZATION	PC	---
TBA	Earth: Revival	Nuverse Pte. Ltd	PC, Mobile	---
