= Video games in Turkey =

In 2025, the Turkish gaming industry was worth around $2.2 billion, with about half of the figure coming from mobile games. Turkey’s video game revenue was $464 million in 2015, and $755 million in 2016—a 63% increase compared to the previous year. Turkey ranked 16th in the world in online game revenue during 2016. As of 2021, Turkey was ranked the 18th largest gaming market in the world. This ranking is partly due to studios such as Peak and TaleWorlds, who published Mount & Blade.

== Professional gaming ==
Turkey has a presence in professional e-sports, especially in League of Legends and other Riot Games titles.

The Türkiye Digital Games Federation was established in 2011 and was later superseded by the e-Sports Federation of Turkey on April 24, 2018.

== Regulation ==
The most widely used video game content rating system in Turkey is the PEGI (Pan European Gaming Information). It was introduced to the country in 2014–2015 and is not supported on an official legal basis. It is used in both foreign and Turkish published video games, though Turkey is not officially represented in the PEGI council. Other labels, such as the German USK, also appear, particularly on second-hand items.

The Intellectual Property Registration and Registration Department began to regulate video games in 2006. This required the use of a rating system in order to be sold on the Turkish market, similar to what was implemented for film and television. The criteria used for ratings are still legally uncertain as it is only enforced on physical products. Digital games remain unregulated.

The 2007 Regulation on Internet Bulk Use Providers prohibited internet cafés from allowing customers to play video games containing drug use, incitement to suicide, sexual abuse, obscenity, prostitution, violence, and/or gambling that could negatively affect minors´ development.

Currently, games can be banned by the Ministry of the Interior. As of 2016 no games have effectively been banned, though some games have been investigated due to their content.

== Video game development ==
=== Game developers from Turkey ===
- BeryMery
- Berzah Games (Also co-devs)
- Bluespy Studios
- Cup of Pixels
- Double Barrel Games
- Gorilla Softworks
- Hyperlab
- Lamagama Entertainment
- Laps Games
- M11 Studio (Former publisher)
- Misclick Games
- Motion Blur (Ex-Son Işık in 2004–2013)
- Nowhere Studios
- Permanent Way Entertainment (Games & animations)
- Pinq Games
- Pixeduo Studios
- Pokuch
- Pyrena Studios (Also Pyrena Games/Software)
- Redivided Studios
- Remoob Games
- Simula Games (Turkish HQ. Also German. Simulations.)
- Sobee Studios (Additional page) (Ex-Dinç İnteraktif in 2000–2004)
- Stormling Studios (Ex-Zoetrope Interactive)
- TaleWorlds Entertainment
- Team Machiavelli
- Team Untested
- Turquoise Revival Games
- Wendigo Games

==== Miscellaneous games ====
- AEON Game Studio (Unknown portfolio)
- Dirty LEDS (Unknown portfolio)
- Flamingo Game Studio (Mobile, AR/VR games)
- Funverse Games (Online games)
- gamegine (Unknown portfolio)
- Gyroscoping Games (Serious games)
- Hypernova Technology & Gaming (Unknown portfolio)
- Inventuna Games (Blockchain)
- Kumkat Games (Online games)
- Makemake Studio (Mobile, blockchain games)
- OTTO Games (Mobile, serious, AR/VR games)
- Rokogame Studios (Blockchain services)
- Semruk Games (Edutainment, serious games)
- Simurgify TECH (Games, websites, mobile apps)

==== Mobile games ====
- Ace Games
- Aden Games
- Bermuda Games
- Bigger Games
- Boom Games Yazilim Ve Ticaret Anonim Sirketi (Casual games)
- Boost Games
- Brew Games
- BugFix Games
- Clap Games (Simulations)
- Cratoonz
- Creasaur Entertainment Co.
- Cube Games
- Cypher Games
- Dream Games
- Duuby Games
- Easy Clap Games
- Eggs Games
- Fabrika Games (Funded by French publisher Voodoo)
- FH Studio
- Fiber Games
- Fomo Games
- Forge Games
- Frosy Game Studios (Supported by Israeli publisher CrazyLabs)
- Frozen Monkey Games
- Fugo Games
- Funmoth Games
- Gamegos
- Gamepatron
- Gametator
- Garawell Games
- Giant Avocado Games
- Gleam Games
- Global Champions (HQ in San Francisco)
- Gulliver's Games
- Gybe Games
- HEY Games
- Hifive Games
- Hoody Studios
- Hyperlab
- Joker Games
- Kontra Games
- Lerp Games
- Libra Softworks
- Longhorn Games
- Lost Panda Games
- Lotus Games
- Lumos Games
- MagicLab Game Technologies
- Mavis Games
- Midpoly Games
- MobGe
- Moon Star Games
- Morii Games
- Nano Games
- Noho Games
- NOKO GAMES
- Optimus Game Studio
- Oxyun
- Pango Games
- Passion Punch Studio
- Peak Games
- phoca.io
- Playabit (Owned by Brazilian company Wildlife Studios.)
- Playtrick
- Quok Games
- Revel Games
- Ricci Game
- Roar Games Studio
- Rooster Games
- Rootcraft Game Technologies
- Sarge Games
- Screaming Parrots
- Scroll Next
- SNG Studios
- Spyke Games (Same as Spike Games)
- Stak Games
- Statue Games
- SuperMesh Games
- Tenet Games
- Teos Game Studio
- tiplay studio
- Umay Games & Studios
- Uniqcorn Games
- Vacuum Games
- Virtual Projects (HQ. Puzzlers.)
- Whoops Games
- Zerosum Games
- Zinky Games

==== Co-development Services ====
- ForceNCode (Games, apps, websites)
- Kyoso Interactive (Online games)
- Oyun Teknolojileri ve Yazılım (Games, interactive apps, apps, websites)

=== Defunct video game developers ===
- Dark Zone Game Studio (Founded 2016. Defunct 2022.)
- Future Dreams (Est. 1990?)
- Locus Design (Est. 1990–1993)
- Ollric Games (Inactive 2021–2022. Mobile games.)

== Video game publishers ==
- Catoptric Games
- Digi Game Startup Studio (Support startups)
- Game Factory (Support startups)
- gamigo (German HQ. Ex-Aeria Games GmbH in 2006-2023. Online games.) (DE wiki)
- Next in Game
- Pera Games (Support startups & teams)
- Youcan Games (Support startups & teams)

=== Publisher and developer firms ===
- 2MEDYA (Core and mobile games)
- 5Deniz Publishing (Mainly distributor)
- Alictus (Mobile games)
- AIx2 Games
- Antique Cat Productions
- Apphic Games (Primarily mobile games)
- Babil Studios (Mobile games. Not the same as the Jordan company 'Babil Games'.)
- Backpack Games (Mobile games)
- Biotech Gameworks
- Blackburne Games
- Cheesecake Dev
- Clock Wizard Games
- Core Engage Yazılım A.Ş.
- Cultic Games
- Curve Animation Studio (Animation & online games)
- Cyperk Software
- DBK Games (aka. 'Burak Dabak')
- DochiGames
- Dumbbell Games (Core & mobile games)
- Eightfold Interactive
- Elos Games And Arts (US HQ)
- Erik Games (Games; Unreal Engine assets)
- GameDeus
- Good Job Games Bilişim Yazılım ve Pazarlama A.Ş. (Mobile games)
- Good Mood Games
- Happy Game Company (Mobile games)
- Hero Concept
- HurryCat Studios
- Inspector Studios (Primarily mobile games)
- Kodobur Game And Software Technologies (Aka. Kodobur Games)
- LIGHTWORKER GAMES
- LootCopter Game Studio (Mobile games)
- Lucid11 Interactive (Also co-dev: mobile games & apps, VR)
- MildMania (Mobile/online games)
- MYM Games Studios
- No Ceiling Games (Also co-dev)
- Nokta Games
- Pendulum Interactive
- Phew Phew Games
- Playin Bilişim Teknolojileri ve Yazılım Ticaret A.Ş. (Mobile & ad games; online platform)
- Playstige Interactive (Ex-'Ator Neba' in 2019)
- Proximity Games
- Pxindie
- Redhorizon Teknoloji A.Ş. (aka. Red Horizon. VR.)
- Rollic Games (Mobile, casual games)
- Ruby Game Studio (Mobile games)
- SinginGiant
- Stratera Games
- SuperGears (Mobile games)
- Tale Era Interactive
- Tekden Studio
- The Pack Studios
- Udo Games (Mobile games)
- Valentware Games LTD
- Vawraek Technology Inc. (Online games)
- Warlock Arts Ltd (Core & mobile games)
- Wolves interactive (Mobile-focused)
- World of Poly Games
- Woziva
- Xeirel Software (Online games. C#, video editing, VFX.)

=== Online games portal/distribution ===
- EPIN Ödeme ve İletişim Teknolojileri A.Ş. (Distribution)
- eTail.Market (From "5Deniz Ltd")
- İtemSatış
- İtemPazar
- Kabasakal Online
- Klasgame.Com
- MGM Bilgi Teknolojileri A.Ş
- Oyunfor
- Gamesultan.com.tr
- RWAZONE (Adult interactive games & visual stories)
- Vatangame.com (Distribution)
- YeşilyurtGame (Distribution)

==== Defunct video game publishers ====
- PulseTense Games (Founded 2011. Morphed into Playstige Interactive in 2019.)
- Rocwise Entertainment (Publisher & dev. Founded 2016. Defunct 2021. Owned by Armoya Interaktif Yayincilik A.S.)
- SiliconWorx Software (Publisher & dev. Founded 1993. Defunct 1995?)
