= GameKing =

Handheld video game console

GameKing is a brand of handheld game consoles, designed and developed by Timetop and manufactured by Guangzhou Panyu Gaoming Electronics Co., Ltd., (also known as GZ Daidaixing Electronics Tech Co., Ltd.) in 2003, for the Hong Kong consumer market. The brand has three consoles, the GameKing I, the GameKing II and the GameKing III. A fourth console, the Handy Game, was produced by Timetop and shares some branding, but otherwise has little to do with the GameKing franchise.

== GameKing I (GM-218) ==
Game King
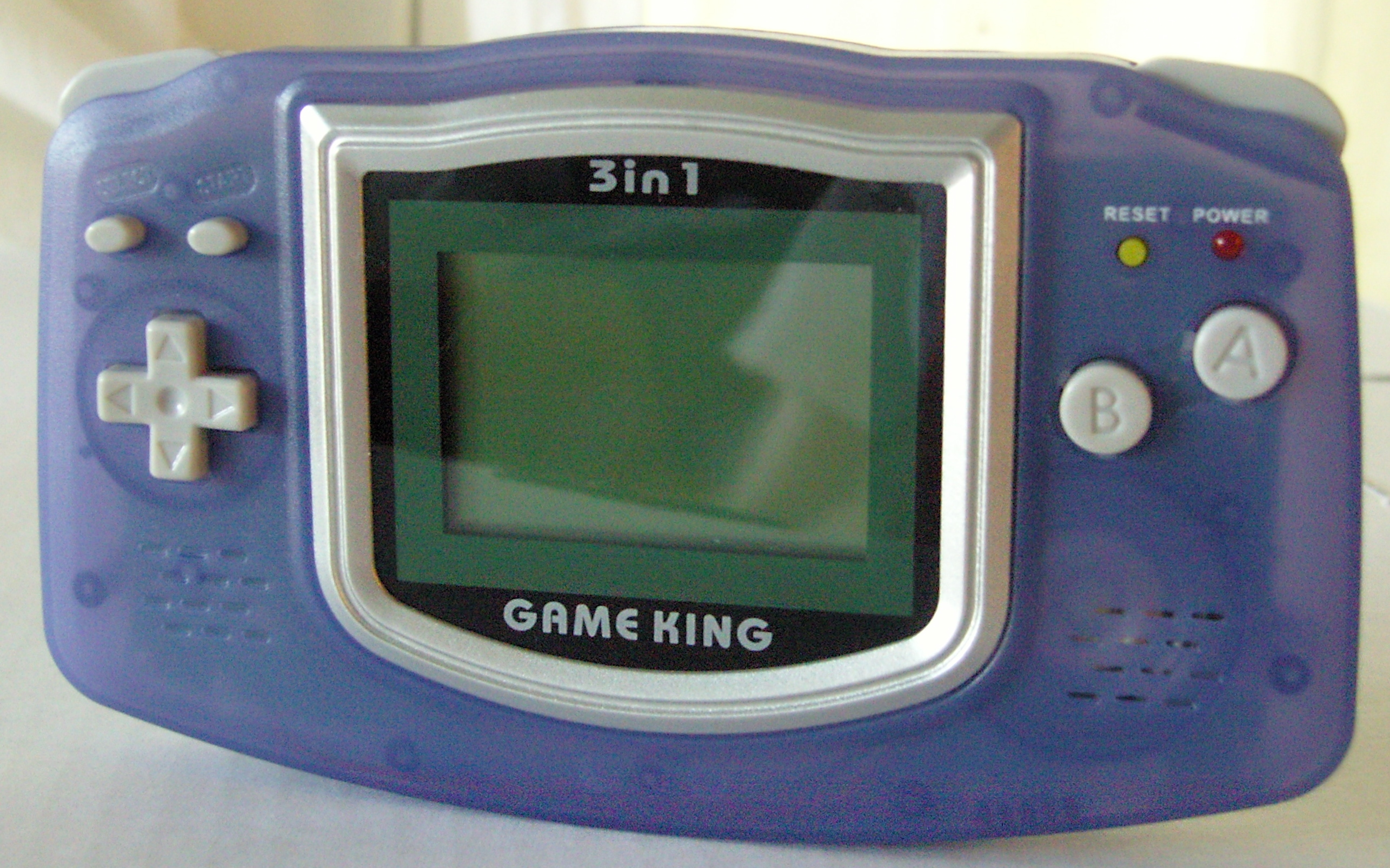
- Original GameKing (GM-218)
- Also known as: GM-218
- Developer: Timetop
- Manufacturer: Guangzhou Panyu Gaoming Electronics Co., Ltd.
- Type: Handheld game console
- Released: September 2004
- CPU: 65C02 @ 6 MHz
- Storage: game carts
- Display: LCD, 48 x 32, 4 shades of grey
- Sound: Digital samples

The original GameKing console is an 8-bit handheld game console released in September 2004. It is based on a 65C02 CPU running at 6.0 MHz.

It is fashioned to look like Nintendo's Game Boy Advance and comes in a wide array of vivid pastel colors, either opaque or transparent, and uses two AAA size batteries.

The console has above-average sound circuitry capable of multi-channel music and digital sound playback, but a comparably low quality non backlit grayscale LCD screen, only supporting four shades of grey and having a very low 48 x 32 pixels resolution.

Games can be compared to some of the earlier built-in cell phone games (pre Java games), while their playing speed (scrolling etc.) and audio is far superior (multi-channel music and digitized samples and voices are quite common in GameKing games).

The GameKing (GM-218) was released in Italy by Giocattoli Linea Paggio.

=== Audio hardware ===
It is unclear whether the machine uses a traditional programmable sound generator or relies only on digital samples for music and sound effects. Many of its games have soundtracks consisting of short audio samples with a sampling rate of 8 kHz, as opposed to games on other systems such as the Game Boy where sound is generated by a custom programmable sound generator.

=== Video hardware ===
According to Brian Provinciano's reverse engineering of the GameKing, most GameKing games heavily rely on bitmap rather than tile-based rendering of the screen, e.g. most levels in its platform and shoot 'em up games are in reality large 4-color bitmaps, instead of using the most common method of graphic tiles and tile maps, like in most other game consoles and arcade games. This was probably done for economic reasons (the CPU alone can handle all graphics easily, at that resolution) and easy development of the games, apart from the objectively low resolution of the screen. While such a scheme seems to work, it has the disadvantage of using cartridge space inefficiently, so that e.g. most platform games are limited to three levels.

== GameKing II (GM-219) ==
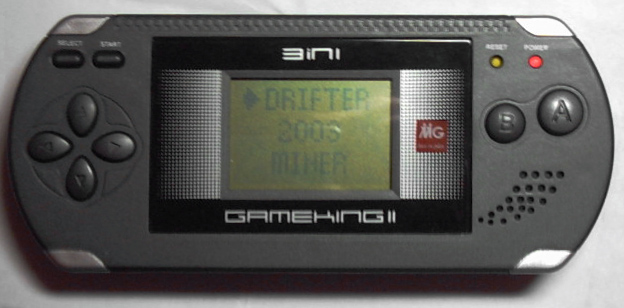
A GameKing II (GM-219) with its selection menu

The GameKing II (GM-219) released in October 2004, on the other hand, is fashioned to look like Sony's PlayStation Portable, comes in more sober colors (either black, grey, white or aqua - and although not shown on the packaging, yellow ones do also exist), and uses 3 AAA size batteries, of which only 2 are used to actually power up the GameKing's hardware, while the third one serves to power up both its built-in audio amplifier (a bit more powerful than the one on the original GameKing) and its backlit LCD screen (which can be turned on and off at will, depending on external lighting conditions, thus saving power). The unit can still work with 2 batteries, only with no sound and no backlighting available.

Also, the GameKing II has a fixed color background picture for its LCD screen, only visible when the backlighting is switched on. This is probably to give the false impression of having a colour LCD screen, as implied on its box. The picture may vary between various GameKing models, however it has a mostly negative effect on screen readability when the backlighting is turned on. This background picture can also be removed or replaced simply by opening the machine and removing the small plastic transparency behind the LCD. Removing it makes using the backlighting much more effective.

This model would also be the last in the Gameking line to have the text "3in1" stamped above the screen.

=== GM-222 ===
The GM-222 was released in 2006 and sports an original design, which does not borrow much from previous models. Even though it is sequenced later than the other consoles in the Gameking line, and therefore one would expect more advanced hardware, it is in fact a redesigned Gameking II with the back-light removed (notice however that the box for the GM-221 and GM-222 both show exactly the same false color screen shot, despite the two machines vastly different capabilities). It is not known why Timetop chose to release the GM-222 in this fashion, although renderings exist that show this design was intended at some point to be a full color model. It was available in charcoal, blue, and green.

=== GK "I" vs. GK II ===
The two models are fully hardware compatible, can use the same games/cartridges, both have volume and contrast controls and use the same LCD screen. Also, they both have an external DC power supply 3.5 mm minijack plug; however, the plug is not labeled as such, and its function is only slightly hinted at in the units' manuals. The GameKing requires 3V DC, while the GameKing2 requires 4.5V DC with the peculiarity of needing to keep at least one battery in the unit in order to have sound and backlighting.

=== GameKing/GameKing II games ===
The console has a small selection of known games (36), being 3 built in and 33 in carts, although 37 games were said to be available by TimeTop. Most games are clones of famous NES, C64 or Atari 2600 titles, with heavily dropped graphics. The games come in cartridges resembling the original Game Boy ones, with a typical size of 128KB, although 4-in-1 cartridges are available, containing 4 normal GameKing games plus a selection menu, and have a maximum size of 512KB.

Both the GameKing and GameKing II come with three built in games.

- Drifter, a Wonder Boy/Adventure Island clone (Which seems to use music from Castlevania III: Dracula's Curse)
- 2003, a 1942 clone.
- Miner or Mine Battle, a Bomberman clone (Which seems to use music taken from the now-defunct Flash game, Spybot: The Nightfall Incident)

Here follows an incomplete list of known games. Please note that many GameKing games use the same program altering only graphics to create "new" games e.g. 2003 and 2004 are essentially the same game with minor differences. Also, many games have major inconsistencies between the box, manual and in-game title. E.g., Lanneret becomes Hawk in the game title, Feichuan becomes "Shenzhou Liuhao" in the game, or Carlo Adventure Legend becomes Caro in-game.

- 2004, essentially the same game as the built in 2003.
- Ares, Feichuan are all classic arcade shooters, probably using the same engine as 2003 and 2004 with different graphics.
- Armada, an arcade shooter (clone unknown).
- Blaster, a Blaster Master clone, a platform game with a shooting vehicle.
- Brains, a Moai-kun clone.
- Carlo Adventure Legend, a Super Mario Bros. clone.
- Catman, another platform game with weapons, but with large sprites.
- Chaser, a marine defense game (clone unknown).
- Clever Hawk, a Star Force-like game, but not the same game as Star Ghazi.
- Dino Adventure, essentially Carlo Adventure Legend with different graphics.
- Dracula Zone or Surf Eidolon: A Silver Surfer clone(?).
- Duckman, a Darkwing Duck clone.
- F1 2004, a Formula One racing game resembling Pole Position.
- Happy Killer and Happy Ball, both Lode Runner clones.
- Hawk or Lanneret, a Choplifter clone.
- HERO: a Batman or H.E.R.O. clone.
- Lightsword, a shooter that puts you on foot and then into a flying-robot shooter form (clone unknown).
- Metal Deform, a platform game with shooting elements and a jetpack(?). (clone unknown)
- Nagual, a Kung Fu Master clone.
- Penguin, an Antarctic Adventure/Tux Racer clone.
- Pocket Tank, a Rambo/Front Line clone with a tank.
- Popper, essentially the same game as the built in Miner.
- Risker, a game similar to Spy Hunter in mechanics.
- Seatercel, a Tiger Heli clone.
- Soldier, a Contra / Gryzor clone.
- Star Ghazi or Star Chazi, a Star Force clone
- Star Wars, a Macross-based clone, allowing the player to choose all three shapeshifting Fighter-Gerwalk-Battroid configurations.
- Street Hero, a Double Dragon clone.
- Super Motor, essentially like F1 2004 with motorcycles instead of cars.
- Three Battles, an Ikari Warriors-like game.
- Trojan Legend, a Mega Man clone.
- Valliant, a robot space fighting game (clone unknown). The sprites are pretty large.
- Warrior, a Front Line clone without the tank.

Games are generally sold in separate cartridges, but there are 4-in-1 cartridges holding 4 distinct games. Later games seem to be only available in this manner. Also, each 4-in-1 pack comes numbered and higher numbers seem to provide games that are more refined in presentation.

Some of these games found in 4-in-1 cartridges are

- Cyclon Action
- Might
- CarMan
- Spectask
- Captain (Which seems to use music from Mega Man X)
- Seaguard
- Whirlybird
- Happy Garden
- Airhero
- Magician
- Explorer
- Farer
- Seabedwar
- Sortie
- Phantom Fighter

== GameKing III (GM-220) ==
TimeTop quietly released a third GameKing machine, called the 'GameKing III' or GM-220 sometime in 2005. While early advertisements showed the GameKing III with the same "false color" background picture as the GameKing I and II, which indicated that the system was black and white like the previous GameKing models, the GM-220 is full colour. Another distinction of the GM-220 is that unlike its predecessors, the Gameking I and II, which were promoted and marketed worldwide, the Gameking III was not distributed outside of Asia, making it much less common than the earlier models. In 2005, many websites initially reported the device as "coming soon", and it is not known why Timetop eventually decided to offer only a limited release.

The resolution doesn't seem enhanced compared to an original GameKing, and "classic" GameKing cartridges are automatically colorized, while games especially developed for it allegedly make use of the full color palette, which for the moment remains unknown. The site claimed a total of 12 carts for this system. If the built-in game is included, 8 titles are known as of 2010.

A new design for the GKIII was placed in April 2006 at the Timetop site, and later removed (see GM-221, below).

=== GM-221 ===
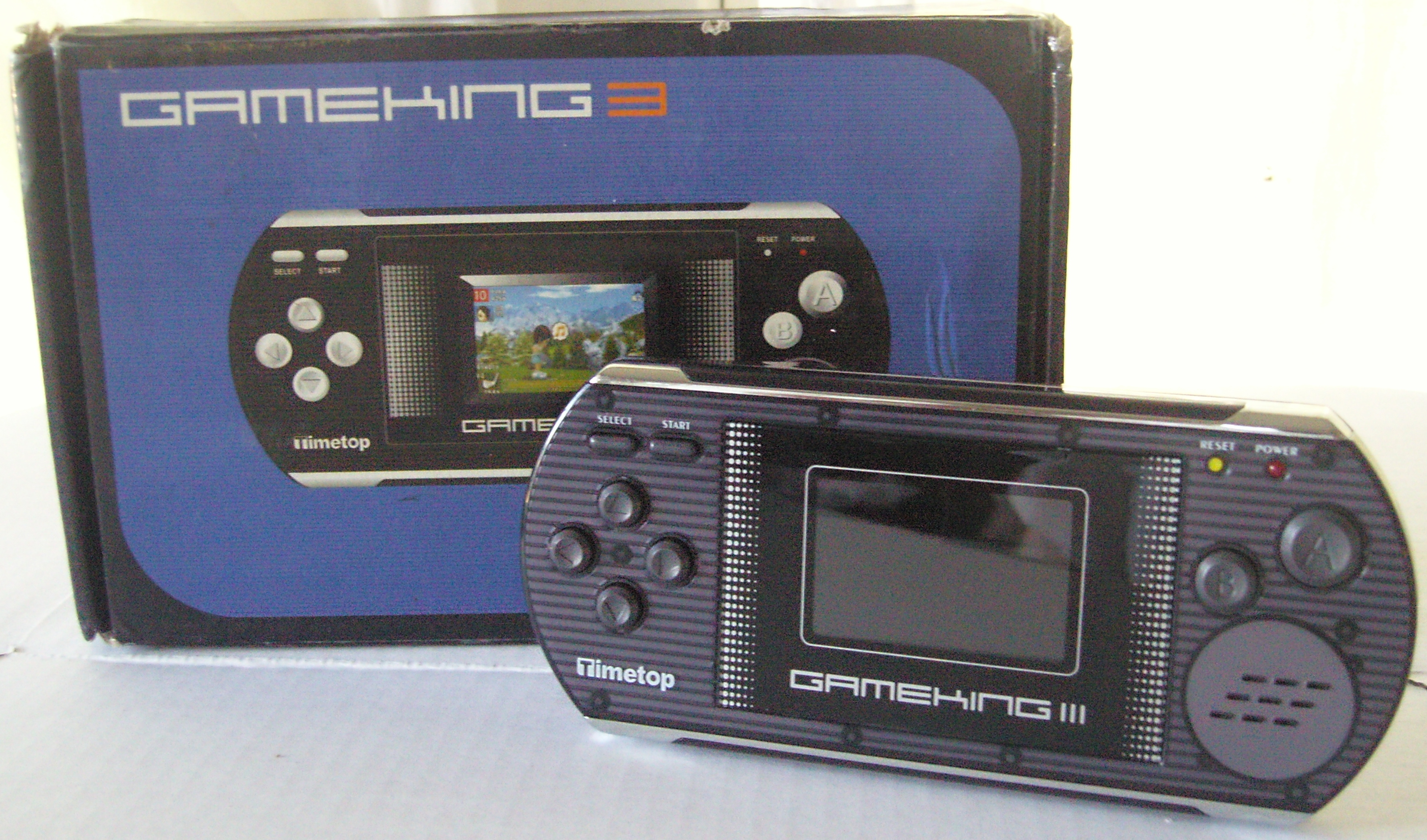
GameKing III GM-221

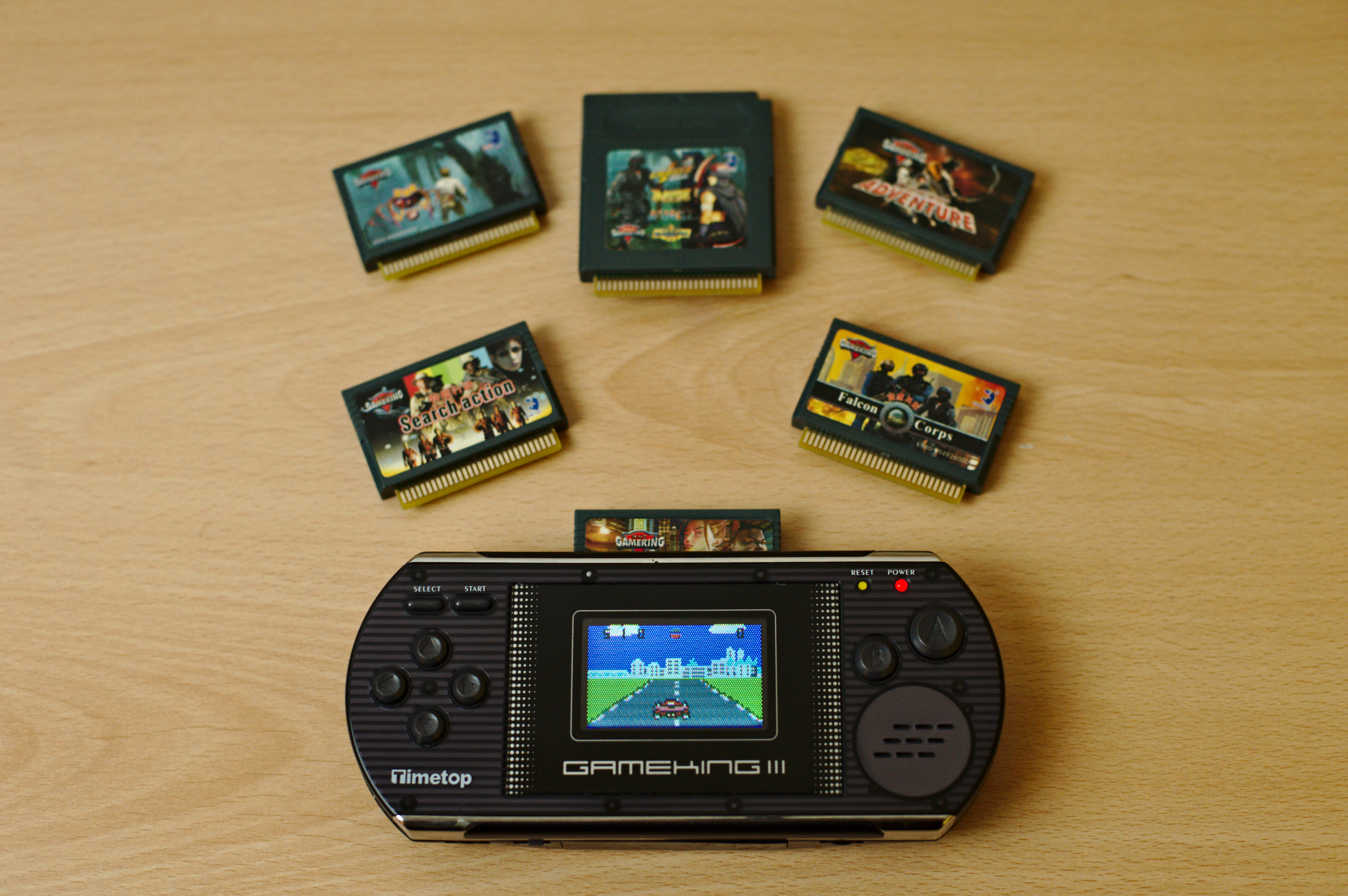
GameKing III handheld video game console with games, demonstrating its notable hexagonal screen

A second design for the Gameking III also exists which combines elements from the GM-219 with the GM-220. The Button design and layout is from the GM-220 design, with the "A" button being distinctly larger than the "B" button, but the overall form is obviously inspired from Sony's PSP design. Several colors are shown on the back of the box, green and orange for example, however only two colors, a black edition and a white edition are confirmed to exist.

=== GameKing III games ===
GameKing III machines have a built-in game:

- Galaxy Crisis

At the moment the only known game carts for the GameKing III are:

- Adventure
- Urgent Action
- Diamond
- Panzer
- Fly Car
- Blaze Plane
- 2030
- Hermic Battle
- Vagrant

== Handy Game (GM-228) ==
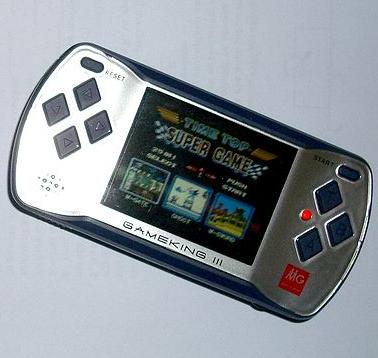
Handy Game (GM-228) early model, labeled as Gameking III

A distinct Timetop console exists which uses Famiclone hardware rather than the proprietary hardware of the other Gameking consoles, and also has an integrated TV output. While early mockups indicated this handheld was considered part of the Gameking line, Timetop eventually removed the gameking branding from this edition prior to its release, replacing it with "Timetop LTPS Handy Game" ( ironically, "handy-game" was the working title EPYX coined in 1987 for what would become the Atari Lynx). The console comes with 25 built-in games and is also able to accept cartridges, however their size and connectors are different from (and incompatible with) previous Gameking consoles. The game selection includes games typically found on NES clones, like 1942, Pooyan or Dig Dug, as well as graphic ROM hacks of famous NES games (for example, using Blue's Journey graphics with Adventure Island).

The GM-228 was available in a large variety of colors with some faceplaces containing very elaborate designs. Colors included silver, black, green, yellow, and pink.

=== HandyGame (GM-228) games ===
The famiclone version of the GameKing III has its own selection of games, most of them being pirated or unlicensed Famicom/NES games or variations. These come multi-carts with combinations such as 26in1, 49in1, and 72in1, etc. No HandyGame carts are compatible with any previous model.
