= Index of DOS games =

The index of MS-DOS compatible video games is split into multiple pages because of its size.

To navigate by individual letter use the table of contents below.

This list contains 2455 games. (Note: This number is always up to date by the script.)
