= List of RPG Maker games =

Video game list

RPG Maker is a series of video game development softwares developed by Enterbrain, generally for role-playing video games and adventure games. Games are generally developed for computer platforms, but certain games have been ported to video game consoles.

There are currently 105 (Note: This number is kept up to date by this script.) games in this list. If the publisher space is vacant, it means the game was self-published.

== List ==
List of RPG Maker games
Title	Developer(s)	Publisher(s)	Version(s)	Release date	Ref.
8-Bit Adventures: The Forgotten Journey	Critical Games	—N/a		May 22, 2015	
8-Bit Adventures 2	Critical Games	—N/a		January 31, 2023	
Actual Sunlight	WZO Games	—N/a	VX Ace	April 3, 2014	
Always Sometimes Monsters	Vagabond Dog	Devolver Digital	VX Ace	May 21, 2014	
Angels of Death	Hoshikuzu KRNKRN	Den Fami Nico Game Magazine	VX Ace	August 14, 2015	
Angels of Death Episode.Eddie	Makoto Sanada, Vaka Game Magazine	Vaka Game Magazine		May 21, 2020	
The Aquarium Does Not Dance	Daidai	Gotcha Gotcha Games	MZ	February 15, 2024	
Ara Fell	Stegosoft Games	—N/a	2003	June 2, 2016	
Artis Impact	Mas	—N/a	MZ	August 7, 2025	
Ao Oni	noprops	—N/a	XP	November 2008	
Aveyond: Rhen's Quest	Aveyond Studios	—N/a	XP	January 19, 2006	
Beautiful Escape: Dungeoneer	Calunio	—N/a	2003	May 5, 2010	
A Bird Story	Freebird Games	—N/a	XP	November 7, 2014	
Black Souls	Eeny, meeny, miny, moe?	Otaku Plan	VX Ace	September 25, 2016	
Black Souls II	Eeny, meeny, miny, moe?	Otaku Plan	VX Ace	November 10, 2018	
Blank Dream	Kanawo	—N/a	XP	May 5, 2015	
Boyhood's End	Buriki Clock, WSS playground	Alliance Arts, WSS playground	MZ	TBA	
The Case Book of Arne	Harumurasaki	Den Fami Nico Game Magazine		November 6, 2017	
Cat in the Box	Gustav	—N/a	VX Ace	May 1, 2020	
Cherry Tree High Comedy Club	773	Capcom, Nyu Media	XP	June 20, 2010	
Cloe's Requiem	Buriki Clock	—N/a	VX	October 2, 2013	
The Coffin of Andy and Leyley	Nemlei, Kit9 Studio	Kit9 Studio	MV	March 25, 2023	
Corpse-Party	Kenix Soft	—N/a	Dante 98	April 22, 1996	
Danger Zone Friends	Sassy Echidna Software	—N/a		January 26, 2019	
Deeproot Manor	FuocoFatuo	—N/a	MV	November 19, 2021	
Demons Roots	Quick nail Aristocrat	Kagura Games		November 19, 2021	
Diary of Lucie	Parange Project	—N/a	MV	February 24, 2023	
Dreaming Mary	accha, Trass	—N/a	VX Ace	April 17, 2014	
Dweller's Empty Path	Temmie Chang	—N/a	MV	July 10, 2020	
The Endless Empty	Erik Sheader-Smith	—N/a	VX Ace	November 3, 2018	
Escaped Chasm	Temmie Chang	—N/a	MV	April 2, 2019	
Eternal Eden	Blossomsoft	—N/a	VX	December 11, 2008	
Eternal Senia	Sanctum Games	—N/a	VX Ace	June 18, 2015	
Fantasy Maiden's Odd Hideout	Buriki Clock	—N/a	VX	August 9, 2014	
Fausts Alptraum	LabORat Studio	—N/a	XP	August 14, 2015	
Fear & Hunger	Miro Haverinen	Happy Paintings	MV	December 11, 2018	
Fear & Hunger 2: Termina	Miro Haverinen	Happy Paintings	MV	December 9, 2022	
Felvidek	Jozef Pavelka, Vlado Ganaj	Tutto Passa	MVA	March 29, 2024	
Finding Paradise	Freebird Games	—N/a	XP	December 14, 2017	
Firework	Shiying Studio	Gamera Game	MV	February 4, 2021	
The Forest of Drizzling Rain	Hoshikuzu KRNKRN	Den Fami Nico Game Magazine	VX Ace	October 11, 2013	
Gingiva	John Clowder	—N/a	XP	September 28, 2013	
Götterdämmerung	Default Games	—N/a	XP	September 24, 2012	
Grimm's Hollow	Ghosthunter	—N/a	2003	October 31, 2019	
Heartbeat	Team Chumbosoft	—N/a	MV	September 14, 2018	
Helen's Mysterious Castle	Satsu	Satsu, Playism	2000	December 23, 2011	
HorrorVale	BatWorks Software	Electric Airship		October 14, 2024	
Hylics	Mason Lindroth	—N/a	VX Ace	August 4, 2015	
Ib	kouri	Playism	2003, MV	February 27, 2012	
Impostor Factory	Freebird Games	—N/a	XP	September 30, 2021	
In Stars and Time	insertdisc5	Armor Games Studios	MV	November 20, 2023	
Jimmy and the Pulsating Mass	Starseed Games	—N/a	VX Ace	August 7, 2018	
Kanye Quest 3030	Phenix	—N/a	VX Ace	July 22, 2013	
Kokurase	galanti	Den Fami Nico Game Magazine	VX Ace	May 2015	
Lenin - The Lion	Lornyon	—N/a	MV	September 28, 2019	
Lily’s Well	Pure Ice Blue	—N/a	MV	December 27, 2021	
Lisa: The First	Dingaling Productions	—N/a	2003	October 9, 2012	
Lisa: The Joyful	Dingaling Productions	—N/a	VX Ace	August 25, 2015	
Lisa: The Painful	Dingaling Productions	—N/a	VX Ace	December 15, 2014	
A Long Road Home	One Bit Studio	—N/a		January 31, 2017	
Look Outside	Francis Coulombe	Devolver Digital	MV, MZ	March 21, 2025	
Machina of the Planet Tree -Planet Ruler-	Denneko Yuugi	Sekai Project		November 21, 2013	
Manafinder	Wolfsden	—N/a	MV	October 5, 2022	
Melon Journey	almondmelon	—N/a	2003	June 26, 2012	
Middens	John Clowder	—N/a	XP	September 9, 2012	
Midnight Syndrome	Natsumikan	—N/a	MV	April 24, 2024	
Midnight Train	LydiaBluebell	—N/a	VX Ace	November 10, 2020	
Mr. Saitou	Laura Shigihara	—N/a	XP	March 23, 2023	
Nepenthe	Yitz	—N/a	MV	May 17, 2018	
Nina Aquila: Legal Eagle, Season One	Tanuki-sama Studios	—N/a	MV	July 10, 2021	
Noel the Mortal Fate	Kanawo	Den Fami Nico Game Magazine	MV	May 15, 2018	
Off	Unproductive Fun Time	—N/a	2003	May 14, 2008	
Omori	OMOCAT LLC	—N/a	XP, MV	December 25, 2020	
OneShot	Future Cat LLC	Komodo	XP	December 8, 2016	
Orangeblood	Grayfax Software	Playism	MV	January 14, 2020	
An Outcry	Quinn K.	—N/a	2003	January 5, 2022	
Palette	Yubiningyō	—N/a	95	1998	
Pocket Mirror	AstralShift, VisuStella	Komodo	VX Ace, MZ	July 22, 2016	
Pokémon Uranium	JV	—N/a	XP	August 6, 2016	
Pom Gets Wi-Fi	Brianna Lei	—N/a	2003	August 12, 2013	
Purgatory Dungeoneer	Cannibal Interactive	Strange Scaffold		October 7, 2022	
Rakuen	Laura Shigihara	—N/a	XP	May 10, 2017	
Ruina: Fairy Tale of the Forgotten Ruins	Shoukichi Karekusa	—N/a	2000	December 24, 2008	
Shūjin e no Pert-em-Hru	Makoto Serise	—N/a	Dante 98 II	May 31, 1998	
Shut In	Cael O'Sullivan	Hidden Track	MV	October 30, 2020	
Skinwalker	SnowOwl	—N/a	VX Ace	October 10, 2013	
Skyborn	Dancing Dragon Games	—N/a	VX	February 22, 2014	
Sometimes Always Monsters	Vagabond Dog	—N/a	VX Ace	April 2, 2020	
Space Funeral	thecatamites	—N/a	2003	September 17, 2010	
Stray Cat Crossing	Team Fridge	—N/a	VX Ace	August 28, 2015	
Subway Exorcist Girl	Delicate Fingers	—N/a	MV	January 25, 2025	
Suits: A Business RPG	Technomancy Studios	—N/a	2000	January 5, 2016	
Super Columbine Massacre RPG!	Danny Ledonne	—N/a	2000	April 20, 2005	
Sweet Lily Dreams	RosePortal Games	Komodo	XP	May 16, 2014	
Symphony of War: The Nephilim Saga	Dancing Dragon Games	indie.io	VX Ace	June 10, 2022	
To the Moon	Freebird Games	—N/a	XP	November 1, 2011	
Tropicalia	Paulo Henrique Franqueira	—N/a		September 25, 2020	
Underworld Capital Incident	Rinnedou	—N/a	VX	December 30, 2014	
Vampires Dawn	Alexander Koch	—N/a	2000	2001	
Wadanohara and the Great Blue Sea	Kaitei Shujin	—N/a	2000	December 21, 2013	
Where They Cremate the Roadkill	John Clowder	—N/a	XP	September 29, 2017	
The Witch's House	Fummy	Dangen Entertainment	VX, MV	October 3, 2012	
The World is Your Weapon	Kagaya	Dwango		June 27, 2019	
Your Turn to Die -Death Game by Majority-	Nankidai	0up Games	MV	August 28, 2017	
Yume Nikki	Kikiyama	—N/a	2003	June 26, 2004	
