= Midden (disambiguation) =

A midden is an old dump for domestic waste associated with past human occupation.

Midden may also refer to:

- Packrat midden, a debris pile constructed by a woodrat
- Privy midden, a toilet system that consisted of a privy associated with a midden (or middenstead)
- Dung midden, an animal toilet area or dunghill, also serving as a territorial marker
- Middens (video game), a surrealist role-playing game created by John Clowder

== See also ==
- Landfill
- Waste management
- Animal latrine
