= 50 Short Games =

2014 video game

- itch.io version art
- Developer: Stephen Gillmurphy
- Engine: Fusion 2
- Platform: Windows
- Release: 11 January 2014
- Mode: Single-player

50 Short Games is a 2014 video game by Irish independent developer Stephen Gillmurphy, under the name thecatamites. As described by the title, 50 Short Games is a compilation of short-form interactive games, most being experimental and avant-garde in nature. Gillmurphy produced one game per day for the compilation for several months in late 2013. 50 Short Games received positive attention from critics for its unusual format and novel method of creation, and was showcased at Apexart as part of an exhibition in 2019.

== Gameplay ==
Anxiety World, one of the games in 50 Short Games

Purporting to span "genres as diverse as action, treasure hunter, essay and miscellaneous", 50 Short Games contains a number of varied and experimental games with no dominant genre that function as "existential toys, self-experimentation [and] broken half-thoughts". Individual games span from short, passive experiences to longer, sustained gameplay, reflecting the development process for the game. Players select games through a menu reminiscent of multicart.

Examples of games include:

FF35	A satire of the Final Fantasy series, based on Gillmurphy's "sincere admiration and fascination for the series", the game is a slideshow of scenes for an imagined role-playing game before leading to an open plea by the developer to work on the next Final Fantasy game.
Moppy Returns	A sequel to a previous title, Moppy Revives, the game initially resembles a traditional game, with the player as Moppy collecting a key to open a door, but is thwarted by a Dark-Moppy, who triggers text about Moppy's realization of needing to look after their own health.
Operative Assailants	Inspired by Auf Wiedersehen Monty, the game is a narrative experience featuring a "string of gags about an incompetent super group trying to take down a faceless enemy."
The Quiet Man	A scene in which an audience watch the titular film The Quiet Man, only to speak over the film by commenting on the actions occurring within it, reminiscent of the "annoying audiences that ignore the core value of the work".
Which Way	Described as "a point and click journey through a fourth-dimensional funhouse", the concept of the game was based on a previous idea by Gillmurphy to set a maze of rooms using the same box, with different assets to create the illusion of variation.

== Development ==
50 Short Games was developed by Irish independent game developer Stephen Gillmurphy, who had previously developed similar titles including Space Funeral. The game was the first commercial release by Gillmurphy, who stated he wanted to explore commercial distribution out of curiosity "as to how much money I could get and how sustainable it would be." Gillmurphy pursued the idea of a compilation release in response to increasing public attention to his games, which led to anxieties that player expectations may not match the output of a commercial release. The compilation was also pursued as a self-imposed project to seek motivation after being "very unhappy as a result of doing very little", wanting to "overcompensate for my slothfulness" by "posting things constantly, regardless of quality, with no indication of what was worth playing and what wasn't."

Developed over the course of several months in late 2013, each game from 50 Short Games was assembled in the course of a single day. Gillmurphy's process for developing each game involved "drawing games on index cards with markers during lunch breaks." Gillmurphy used Bosca Ceoil, a simple program allowing users to develop loops of music using MIDI instruments, and assembled the resulting loops in Multimedia Fusion 2. Gillmurphy stated that this program was desirable for its disposable and efficient nature, as music for the games was developed quickly "as the last thing I did for a game and mostly done late at night".

Gillmurphy composed detailed notes providing context to the underlying inspiration and process behind the creation of each game. The inspiration behind the games was eclectic, with Gillmurphy citing influences from comic books, literature, music and other independent games as reference points. Some games, including Anxiety World and Night Thoughts, were inspired by personal experiences, dreams and feelings of disorientation arising from working on the game at very early or late hours of the day. Many games were also developed as continuations of previous or half-completed projects.

== Reception ==
50 Short Games received interest from game publications as an unusual and engaging work of experimental design, whilst acknowledging its uneven execution. Writing for Kill Screen, Filipe Salgado found the games to be "playfully experimental" and "dark and funny, alternating between macabre imagery and surreal anti-comedy", whilst acknowledging that the game "isn't, sadly, a good gateway into his work", noting that the game's liner notes function as an "artist's statement that is honest about [its] failures", noting some games come off as "opaque and undercooked". Adam Smith of Rock Paper Shotgun praised 50 Short Games as a "deliriously creative creation [from] one of fringe gaming's strongest and strangest voices" and "a tremendous piece of history." Tom Sykes of PC Gamer stated the games were "exactly as brief, scrappy, hilarious and slightly buggy [and] glitchy as I was expecting", recommending players not expect "polished works of genius" with the game. Julian Bension of PCGamesN stated "each [game] is bizarre, broken, and wonderful in good measure."

In 2019, 50 Short Games was showcased in the New York gallery Apexart as part of Dire Jank, an exhibition curated by writer and game designer Porpentine Charity Heartscape to showcase games depicting "sublime worlds that blossom in the trash". Writing for Art News, Charlie Markbreiter praised the exhibit as a countercultural attempt to differentiate the titles from studio video games, "frequently viewed as a commercial and thus inherently unartistic medium", observing that in contrast the Dire Jank on display are "short and circular narratives of futility."

In 2019, as part of a five-year retrospective since having developed the game, Gillmurphy claimed that 50 Short Games sold "around 500 copies", which he considered a success in comparison to similar "weird scrappy narrative art games."
