= List of Incognito Cinema Warriors XP episodes =

The following is a list of Incognito Cinema Warriors XP (abbreviated ICWXP), DVD, comic books, and online videos. ICWXP is a post-apocalyptic zombie comedy DVD and web series created by Rikk Wolf and produced by Agonywolf Media. The first season of the show follows the same "host segment-movie segment" format that MST3k established, while featuring completely original characters and plot. The second season is more plot-driven and riffs short films as opposed to full-length movies.

== Incognito Cinema Warriors DVD Series ==
Season one consists of 4 feature-length episodes, and mostly revolve around the movie being presented rather than an over-stretching plot. Creator Rikk Wolf has said that he would like to go back and remake the first episode as well as make two additional episodes to finish the season but doubts that he would be able to find the time.

Season One
#	Movie	Release date	Season One Notes
101	Bride of the Gorilla	1 Sep. 2008	Only episode to have movie segments shot in the same silhouetted format as MST3k.; Episode features a laugh track that was never used again due to negative reaction from viewers.; The makers of ICWXP have expressed a dislike of Episode One and have discontinued DVD sales.
102	Lady Frankenstein	1 Oct 2008	First episode to feature the silhouetted characters in the balcony during movie segments.; Episode features a character named Daryl played by Nick Evans who would later go on to voice Topsy Bot 5000 in Season 2.; First episode to feature voicemails from fans.
103	Bloody Pit of Horror	1 Dec 2008	"The Talking Car" short precedes the film.; Last episode to feature Rob Atwell as Topsy Bot 5000/Dr Blackwood.; Introduction of Zed, a bi-polar disembodied talking zombie head.
104	Werewolf in a Girls’ Dormitory	1 May 2010	A new and improved theme song and intro is introduced along with an upgraded candy counter set.; Dr Blackwood is presumed to be killed off screen and replaced by a new villain named Kincaid.; First and only episode to feature Gregory Wyatt Tinnen as Topsy Bot 5000/Kincaid.; "Ghost Rider" short precedes the film

Upon completion Season Two will have 6 full episodes and two mini episodes. The length of the season two episodes very, and are more plot driven than the first season. The movie segments have been scale back and replaced with shorts. The gap between season one and season two is covered in the official ICWXP comic book.

Season Two
#	Episode title	Shorts/Movie	Release date	Season Two Notes
201	Wake Me Up Before You Decompose	Victory Gardens	1 Apr 2011	Episode takes place 5 years after Episode 104.; First Episode to have Nick Evans voice the character of Topsy Bot 5000.; Introduction of arcade droid named Flux Namtari, voiced by Dave Thompson; First episode to be under an hour (47 minutes) and to feature a short instead of a movie.
202	Where's Your Big Bad Apocalypse Now?	Soapy the Germ Fighter	1 Aug 2011	Second and last episode of the season to be under an hour (55 Minutes); First episode to feature characters venture outside of the Cine-A-Sorrow Theater.; Introduction of Spencer and Birkin, bumbling agents of the Ludivico Corporation.
203	The Gear Is Family	The Great American Chocolate Factory	1 Jan 2012	First episode of the season to be over an hour in runtime (1 hour and 6 minutes).; Episode opens with 14-minute recap of the events of Season 1 and 2 through the preservative of one of the robots.; Characters discover the internet still works in the zompocalypse and catch up on the past five years.
203.5	Zombie Poo-Pocalyse	Resident Evil: Retribution	29 Nov 2012	YouTube Exclusive Episode set in between episodes 203 and 204.; Review based episode in the style of Red Letter Media's Half in the Bag.; Creator Rikk Wolf has said this episode was made to establish that more can be done with the ICWXP characters than just movie riffing.
204	Fahrenheit Cine-A-Sorrow	The Haunted Mouth & The Power to Serve	1 Jan 2013	First episode to feature Jason Chaffee as Flux Namtari.; First episode to feature the zombie worshipers who eventually become the main threat of the season.; Introduction of Topsy Bot 5000's new and "more expressive" head upgrade.; Second episode of the season to be over an hour in runtime (1 hour and 31 Minutes).
205	Bad Guys Wear #000000	In Danger Out of Doors & Linda's Film on Menstruation	8 May 2017	Creator Rikk Wolf claims that 205 "is the closest they will get to an ICWXP: The Movie" in DVD commentary.; At 1 hour and 46 minutes, this is the longest episode of season two.; The ending of this episode is animated in the style of the JRPG video games.
205.5	70's Rockumentary	Fences & Gates	Dec 25 2017	YouTube Exclusive Episode that more in continuity with IGWXP "Let's Riff" series than the main DVD series.; This mini-episode was made with the intent to see if there was any interest in YouTube exclusive riffs videos.; This video is no longer available due to a copyright claim by James Stringer.
206	TBA	TBA	TBA	Creator Rikk Wolf has stated that some of 206 has already been shot and will continue with the JRPG animation style of 205 but may not be released until late 2018.; Originally Rikk Wolf intended to have the season two finale to be a riff-based episode featuring the movie Starcrash (1978); but when he discovered that it was used in the 11th season of MST3k he turned his sights to securing the rights for Slipstream (1989)
206.5	TBA	TBA	TBA	TBA

== ICWXP: The Non-Motion Picture ==
ICWXP: The Non-Motion Picture is a comic book series intended to bridge the 5-year gap between Season 1 and 2 of the DVD series. There is a total of two issues available on the Agonywolf Media website, with a third with an unknown release date. The contents of The Non-Motion Picture are a lot more action based than the DVD series or the online gaming spin-off and follow Rick and the Bots as they attempt to escape the Cine-A-Sorrow Theater.

Issue #	Title	Release date	Notes
#1	Moral Victories Are for Losers	6 Jan. 2011	After five long years of painfully bad movies, the Warriors have (kinda) gotten past their differences and become a tightly knit little movie roasting team. Thing is, they've had enough of their forced screenings and decide to defy Zombie Signal, marching outside Cine-A-Sorrow Theater and right into the belly of the zompocalypse. Witness the epic battle we wish we could afford to film between Rick & The 'Bots, the undead horde, and the almighty Kincaid!
#2	The Belly Button of the Beast is an Outie	16 Jan 2013	After a fiery escape attempt, Rick finds himself locked away beneath Cine-A-Sorrow Theater at Kincaid's mercy while Topsy slumbers upon the roof. Miles away, Johnny awakens deep within Ludivico's Research Complex. The Warriors are broken and divided, yet somehow find themselves mysteriously reunited in the last place they'd expect. Things are a gettin' weird.
#3	Rick & the Bot vs Lady Frankenstein	TBA	TBA

== Incognito Gaming Warriors/Robot Co-Op ==
The ICWXP YouTube channel was mainly used for advertising of DVDs and fan interaction until 2015 when Let's Plays featuring the ICWXP characters launched as "Let's Riffs" under the title "Incognito Gaming Warriors XP". The first of these to be uploaded to the channel was a 10 part play-through of Resident Evil HD Remaster. These "Let's Riffs" are done in the same silhouetted style as their DVD series, and range from 35 to 90 minutes. They have had a collaboration with James Rolfe (AVGN) where they riffed a game trailer for Super Mario Odyssey. They have covered many games in this series, including Resident Evil HD Remaster, Hitman, and Fallout 4. They also had a short-lived Let's Riff called "Playing With Myself" series where Rikk would play Mega Man, Monster Party, and Demon Quest with a clone of himself named Rick. In May 2017 IGWXP starting doing a series on Resident Evil 7: Biohazard. that consisted of 90-minute episodes with host segments that pertain to the Resident Evil franchise. Rikk Wolf has stated in a DVD commentary for Episode 205 that he has grown to prefer the riffing style of IGWXP over ICWXP because they can interact with the material better with a game rather than a movie. In October 2017, Agonywolf Media held a poll to change the name of IGWXP to help feather themselves from MST3k. "Robot Co-Op" was the winning poll option, and the Agonywolf Media crew began uploading new "Let's Riffs" with a face-cam style opposed to the silhouette on the new "Robot Co-Op" YouTube channel. Agonywolf Media produces at least one "Let's Riff" a month under the IGWXP (Now Robot-Co-Op) logo to fill in the time between the long stretches between the DVD episodes and to serve as paid content to their Patreon supporters.

Incognito Gaming Warriors XP
Title	Game	Number of Parts	Runtime	Release	Riffers
Incognito Gaming Warriors	Resident Evil HD Remaster	12 Parts	6 Hours & 43 Mins.	Jan 27 2015 - Apr 8, 2016	Rick & Topsy Bot 5000 (Guest appearance by Johnny Cylon)
Playing With Myself	Mega Man Legacy Collection	4 Parts	1 Hour & 3 Mins.	Oct 12, 2015 - Oct 15, 2015	Rick & Rikk
Playing With Myself: Halloween Hootenanny!	Demon's Crest/Monster Party	2 Parts	25 Mins.	Oct 29, 2015 - Oct 30, 2015	Rick & Rikk
Incognito Gaming Warriors	Hitman	2 Parts	1 Hour & 8 Mins.	Apr 26, 2016 - May 27, 2016	Rick & Topsy Bot 5000
Incognito Gaming Warriors	Fallout 4	9 Parts	6 Hours	Aug 1, 2016 - Apr 3, 2017	Rick & Topsy Bot 5000 (Guest appearance by Santa Busey)
Incognito Gaming Warriors	Resident Evil 7: Biohazard	3 Parts	4 Hours & 36 Mins.	May 5, 2017 - July 22, 2017	Rick & Topsy Bot 5000
IGWXP: Nintendo Switch Games	Super Bomberman R, Snipperclips, Ultra Street Fighter II: The Final Challengers, Shovel Knight	1 Part	55 Minutes	Aug 14, 2017	Rick & Topsy Bot 5000 (Guest appearance by Flux Namtari)
IGWXP: A Guy & Two Robots Play Mario Kart 8 Deluxe	Mario Kart 8 Deluxe	2 Parts	1 Hour & 20 Mins.	Sep 4, 2017 - Sep 16, 2017	Rick & Topsy Bot 5000 (Guest appearance by Flux Namtari)
A Girl & Two Guys Play Mario	Mario + Rabbids Kingdom Battle	3 Parts	1 Hour & 44 Mins.	Sep 17, 2017 - Oct 4, 2017	Rikk, Bethanie, & Jason (Not in ICWXP personas)
IGWXP: A Guy & a Robot Play (Later re-titled "Robot Co-Op")	Vaccine	2 Parts	1 Hour & 10 Mins.	Oct 23, 2017 - Nov 20, 2017	Rick & Topsy Bot 5000
A Girl & Two Guys Play Mario	Super Mario Odyssey	2 Parts	55 Mins.	Nov 1, 2017 - Nov 8, 2017	Rikk, Bethanie, & Jason (Not in ICWXP personas)
Raspberry Pi Buffet	Bucky O' Hare, 3D World-Runner, Adventures in the Magic Kingdom, Adventures of Lolo, Super Mario All-Stars	3 Parts	48 Mins.	Nov 6, 2017 - Nov 29, 2017	Rikk & Bethanie(Not in ICWXP personas)

Robot Co-Op
Title	Game	Release Platform	Riffers	Notes
Robot Co-Op	Vaccine	YouTube: Dec 19, 2017 - Dec 20, 2017 (Two Parts)	Rick & Topsy Bot 5000	This series was originally released under the title of "A Guy & a Robot Play"
Robot Co-Op	Ninja Clowns	YouTube: Jan 22, 2018 - Jan 24, 2018 (Two Parts)	Rick & Topsy Bot 5000	The game, "Ninja Clowns," was randomly chosen by the Raspberry Pi gaming console
NoBot Co-Op	Teenage Mutant Ninja Turtles: Turtles in Time	YouTube: Jan 26, 2018 - Jan 31, 2018 (Three Parts)	Rikk, Jason, Nick, & Bethie	First series under the "NoBot Co-Op" title released on YouTube without the robot personas
NoBot Co-Op	Vendetta (1991 video game)	YouTube: Feb 5, 2018 - Feb 12, 2018 (Three Parts)	Rikk, Jason, Nick, & Bethie	
Robot Co-Op	Secret of Mana	YouTube: Feb 19, 2018 - May 1, 2018 (Three Parts)	Rick & Topsy Bot 5000	
NoBot Co-Op	Secret of Mana Remake	YouTube: Feb 21, 2018 - Mar 30, 2018 (Eight Parts)	Rikk, Jason, & Bethie	
Robot Co-Op: Our Disastrous First Twitch Stream	Countdown Vampires, Earthworm Jim, Mary Shelley's Frankenstein, Barbie Super Model	Twitch: Mar 2, 2018 YouTube: Mar 5, 2018 - May 1, 2018 (Three Parts)	Rick & Flux Namtari	
NoBot Co-Op: Twitch Stream	ARK: Survival Evolved	Twitch: Mar 13, 2018 YouTube: Mar 23, 2018 (One Part)	Rikk & Steven	On YouTube the title says "Part 1 of 2" but the second part was never uploaded
Robot Co-Op: Twitch Stream	Resident Evil 2	Twitch: Mar 25, 2018 YouTube: Mar 28, 2018 - May 15, 2018 (Ten Parts)	Rick, Flux Namtari, & Benjamin Pickles	
Robot Co-Op: Let's Roast Hitman™	Hitman	YouTube: May 8, 2018	Rick & Topsy Bot 5000	This was shown to be the third part of the IGWXP series
Robot Co-Op: Twitch Stream	God of War (2018)	Twitch: Apr 20, 2018 YouTube: Apr 21, 2018 - Jun 21, 2018 (Four Parts)	Rick & Flux Namtari	When uploading "Part One" to YouTube, Rikk discovered a strange glitch that would bounce the viewcount by thousands of views
Robot Co-Op: Bot Roast	FuncoLand Training video	YouTube: Jun 5, 2018 - Jun 7, 2018 (Two Parts)	Rick, Flux Namtari, & Topsy Bot 5000	Unlike everything shown previously on Robo Co-Op, this series is a riff of a video rather than a game
