= Murder Dog IV: Trial of the Murder Dog =

2011 video game

- Main menu
- Developer: Stephen Gillmurphy
- Engine: Adventure Game Studio
- Platforms: Windows, Macintosh
- Release: 1 August 2011
- Genre: Adventure
- Mode: Single-player

Murder Dog IV: Trial of the Murder Dog is a 2011 video game by Irish independent developer Stephen Gillmurphy, under the name thecatamites. Murder Dog is an adventure game which involves the player in a courtroom defense of the titular Murder Dog, a canine with a comically obvious penchant for murder. Whilst Murder Dog was satirical in nature, the game received recognition from many critics for its subversive commentary on the justice system.

== Plot ==
The legal system must make a distinction between what we 'know' as individuals and what can be demonstrated as evidence in this bizarre ritualistic setting.

— Dog, in Murder Dog

The player assists "noted murder enthusiast" Murder Dog, a canine on trial at the Hague for "crimes against humanity", charged with "more than 1,500 instances of brutal homicide". Murder Dog is openly unremorseful for the suffering he has caused and vows to murder again, stating openly his "thirst for bloodshed remains voluminous." It is up to the player to present Murder Dog's case and determine the outcome through one of six endings. A small dog located at the bottom of the screen provides commentary on the proceedings as they unfold and their implications for the justice system, whilst opining over the nature of violence and justice.

== Gameplay ==
A screenshot of Murder Dog IV.

The player presents Murder Dog's case using a point-and-click interface to plead their case, present multiple items of evidence, call and cross-examine witnesses, and rest their case. Dialog is presented to the player through a dialog box, as well as a lower dialog box for commentary by the small dog. The dialog options in the game create branching depending on the evidence that is submitted, although it is up to the player as to whether to indict or attempt to exculpate Murder Dog for his crimes. For instance, Murder Dog can eat the evidence presented, destroy witnesses, and attempt to refute the evidence and witness testimonies presented, as well as attempting to murder the jury.

== Development ==
Murder Dog IV was developed by Irish independent game developer Stephen Gillmurphy, known for his work on the game Space Funeral and other independent titles. The game was developed by Gillmurphy over two weeks for a game jam on the defunct platform Super Friendship Club. In 2011, the game was released as part of the IGF Pirate Kart, a compilation of independent video games organised by Mike Meyer resembling a multicart for entry in the 2012 Independent Games Festival. In October 2019, a Macintosh port of the game was published by programmer Jonathan Cole.

== Reception ==
Murder Dog IV received positive attention from critics as a satirical game and unexpected source of subversive commentary on the justice system. As part of a series of articles titled At Play in the Carceral State, Vice writer Cameron Kunzelman reflected the game "revels in the arbitrariness of justice" and "meditates on real-world ideas in a strange, chaotic, and overly-violent way," pressuring "the things we take for granted about the justice system, and about the notion of justice period." Writing for Rock Paper Shotgun Alec Meer sardonically praised the game as a "libertarian rebuke of the modern justice society" and "liberal treatise against the covert endorsement and use of violence by police". A follow-up retrospective by Brendan Caldwell concurred the game was "dangerously self-aware", noting "for unknown reasons", the "verbose dog at the bottom of the screen...finds the entire justice system quaint and unnecessary. He is excellent." Writing for Paste, Darius Kazemi praised the game as a "vehicle for wildly funny parody and social commentary", describing the art style as "perfect."

Murder Dog IV was also a winning entry in the 2020 Game Developers Conference Game Narrative Review Competition, in which game design students complete a detailed analysis of the narrative elements of a game of their choice in their program. Analysing the game, Merita Lundstrom of University of California Santa Cruz stated the game "poses a number of interesting questions about the nature of courtroom proceedings, the failings of the judicial court system, and the relationship between the player and their protagonist’s heinous actions," stating the game's "absurdist humor and hand-formed visuals create the perfect atmosphere for a game as playful and satirical as this one."
