= Nepenthe (disambiguation) =

Nepenthe is a fictional medicine for sorrow.

Nepenthe may also refer to:

- USS Nepenthe (SP-112), a luxury yacht belonging to James Deering
- Nepenthe Productions, the production company of Martin Rosen
- Nepenthe (restaurant), a restaurant in Big Sur, California
- Nepenthe (video game), a hand-drawn role-playing video game
- Nepenthes, a genus of carnivorous plants
- Nepenthes (sculpture), a series of four sculptures by artist Dan Corson
- "Nepenthe" (Star Trek: Picard), an episode of Star Trek: Picard

== Music ==
- Nepenthe (album), a 2013 album by Julianna Barwick
- "Nepenthe", a song on Sentenced's 1995 album Amok
- "Nepenthe", a song on Opeth's 2011 album Heritage

== Literature ==
- Nepenthe, a poetry-focussed science fiction fanzine published by Henry Earl Singleton
- Nepenthe, the setting of Norman Douglas' 1917 novel South Wind
- Nepenthe, the main character of Patricia A. McKillip's 2004 novel Alphabet of Thorn
