= Termina =

Termina may refer to:

- Termina, the setting for the 2000 video game The Legend of Zelda: Majora's Mask
- Fear & Hunger 2: Termina, a 2022 video game
