= Incognito Cinema Warriors XP =

- Also known as: ICWXP; Hanshotgreedo Enema Wayfarers; Incognito Gaming Warriors XP
- Genre: Zombie Comedy
- Created by: Rikk Wolf
- Based on: Mystery Science Theater 3000
- Starring: Rikk Wolf, Zach Legler, Nick Evans, Dave Thompson, Jason Chaffee
- Country of origin: United States
- Original language: English
- No. of seasons: 2
- No. of episodes: 13 (list of episodes)

Related
- The Film Crew; RiffTrax; Cinematic Titanic

Incognito Cinema Warriors XP (abbreviated ICWXP) is a post-apocalyptic zombie comedy DVD and web series created by Rikk Wolf and produced by Agonywolf Media. The show premiered on Myspace and was meant to be a one-time homage to Mystery Science Theater 3000, but after Wolf was contacted by the producers of RiffTrax to participate in the launch of their new site iRiffs, he decided to produce more episodes. The first season of the show follows the same "host segment-movie segment" format that MST3K established, while featuring completely original characters and plot. The second season is more plot-driven and riffs short films as opposed to full-length movies.

== History and influences ==
Rikk Wolf has claimed that he was inspired by director's commentaries in general and the commentary track provided by Mike Nelson on the 2004 colorized re-release of Night of the Living Dead, which lead him to rediscover Mystery Science Theater 3000 (a show he was unable to watch as a teenager because he did not have cable television access). After viewing every episode of the show, he found himself inspired and wanting more, so he assembled acquaintances he found funny from the local Kansas City music scene to independently produce a show in the same vein, but with more of a "heavy metal vibe."

The first episode of ICWXP was produced in 2008 "simply for fun," according to Wolf, as a way to gain experience in film and to pay homage to MST3K. Putting the show on a purchasable DVD was a byproduct of Wolf posting the episode to the ICWXP MySpace page, as numerous e-mails from users wishing to own the episode on disc came in. A demand for more was clearly present, so Wolf continued to work on producing more episodes with the current cast, adding higher production values with each release, as support continued to grow.

Other influences include video games such as Mega Man, Resident Evil, and Dead Rising (all Capcom games). The robots show a heavy influence from Mega Man in their design, CORPS is not entirely unlike the STARS team from Resident Evil, and the situation the protagonists find themselves in is similar to Dead Rising. The characters often reference these influences as well. Wolf (out of character in interviews) has said he loves the notion of zombie growls set against lounge music, which is evident in the show's movie break segments, an idea present in Dead Rising and the Dawn of the Dead films.

== Premise ==
The show roasts or "riffs" bad public domain movies in a style purposely similar to the format established by MST3K, while adding its own original story and characters.

The series follows a soldier and his robot friends who find themselves trapped in an abandoned movie theater during the "zompocalypse." Also in residence is the mad inventor (and later a far more villainous special agent) who owns and controls the theater and, in turn, forces them to watch bad movies in exchange for shelter from the swarming zombies outside.

The soldier and his robot friends provide humorous commentary that usually focuses heavily on each film's flaws in a very sarcastic manner. The films are presented with a silhouette superimposed thereon, featuring the trio on the theater's balcony at the bottom of the frame.

== Cast and characters ==
Characters: (from left to right) Flux Namtari, Commander Rick Wolf, Spy-Bot, Johnny Cylon, and Topsy Bot 5000

The main protagonist in ICWXP is Commander Rick Wolf (played by series creator Rikk Wolf), a soldier of the fictional military branch CORPS (Command of Reanimate Processing and Suppression) who is trapped in the Cine-A-Sorrow. Originally intended as a Concession-Bot, Topsy Bot 5000 (currently voiced by Nick Evens) is the most devious and unruly of the robots. Johnny Cylon (voiced by Zach Legler) is an "Usher-Bot" that was in charge of the duties one would expect from the title at Cine-A-Sorrow Theater. Flux Namtari (currently voiced by Jason Chaffee) is an Arcade-Bot for an arcade that was never made and has depression and alcoholism due to his lack of purpose at the theater. Dr. Harrison Blackwood (Originally portrayed by Rob Atwell and later Rikk Wolf) was the main antagonist on ICWXP from Episode 101 until Episode 104, when he is assaulted and removed from his seat of power at Cine-A-Sorrow Theater by Special Agent Jonathan Kincaid. Kincaid (Played by Gregory Wyatt Tinnen) is only in episode 104 of the DVD series but he also makes an appearance in ICWXP: The Non-Motion Picture which explains his absence in season two. Tinnen was unable to continue with the project due to his work schedule and has stated "Sometimes you have too much fun and the real world has a way of putting a stop to that". The current villain of the series is Echelon Marcus (Doug Marshall) who is the leader of a zombie worshiping cult that wants the Cine-A-Sorrow Theater to fulfill their evil prophecies.

Cast of Incognito Cinema Warriors XP
Character	Season One (2008-2010)				Season 2 (2011–present)								
Character	101	102	103	104	201	202	203	203.5	204	205	205.5	206	206.5
Cdr. Rick Wolf	Rikk Wolf	Rikk Wolf	Rikk Wolf	Rikk Wolf	Rikk Wolf	Rikk Wolf	Rikk Wolf	Rikk Wolf	Rikk Wolf	Rikk Wolf	Rikk Wolf	TBA	TBA
Johnny Cylon	Zach Legler	Zach Legler	Zach Legler	Zach Legler	Zach Legler	Zach Legler	Zach Legler	Zach Legler	Zach Legler	Zach Legler		TBA	TBA
Topsy Bot 5000	Rob Atwell	Rob Atwell	Rob Atwell	Gregory Wyatt Tinnen	Nick Evans	Nick Evans	Nick Evans	Nick Evans	Nick Evans	Nick Evans	Nick Evans	TBA	TBA
Flux Namtari					Dave Thompson	Dave Thompson	Dave Thompson	Dave Thompson	Jason Chaffee	Jason Chaffee	Jason Chaffee	TBA	TBA
Dr. Blackwood	Rob Atwell	Rob Atwell	Rob Atwell	Rikk Wolf			Rikk Wolf		Rikk Wolf			TBA	TBA
Kincaid				Gregory Wyatt Tinnen								TBA	TBA
Echelon Marcus									Doug Marshall	Doug Marshall		TBA	TBA

== List of episodes ==
(See List of Incognito Cinema Warriors XP episodes)

Season one consists of 4 feature-length episodes, and mostly revolve around the movie being presented rather than an overarching plot. Creator Rikk Wolf has said that he would like to go back and remake the first episode as well as make two additional episodes to finish the season but doubts that he would be able to find the time. Upon completion Season Two will have 6 full episodes and two mini-episodes. The length of the season two episodes vary, and are more plot driven than the first season. The movie segments have been scaled back and replaced with shorts. The gap between season one and season two is covered in the official ICWXP comic book.

== Incognito Gaming Warriors/Robot Co-Op ==
The ICWXP YouTube channel was mainly used for advertising of DVDs and fan interaction until 2015 when Let's Plays featuring the ICWXP characters launched as "Let's Riffs" under the title "Incognito Gaming Warriors XP". The first of these to be uploaded to the channel was a 10 part play-through of Resident Evil HD Remaster. These "Let's Riffs" are done in the same silhouetted style as their DVD series, and range from 35 to 90 minutes. They have had a collaboration with James Rolfe (AVGN) where they riffed a game trailer for Super Mario Odyssey. They have covered many games in this series, including Resident Evil HD Remaster, Hitman, and Fallout 4. They also had a short-lived Let's Riff series called Playing with Myself where Rikk would play Mega Man, Monster Party, and Demon Quest with a clone of himself named Rock. In May 2017 IGWXP starting doing a series on Resident Evil 7: Biohazard that consisted of 90-minute episodes with host segments that pertain to the Resident Evil franchise. Rikk Wolf has stated in a DVD commentary for Episode 205 that he has grown to prefer the riffing style of IGWXP over ICWXP because they can interact with the material better with a game rather than a movie. In October 2017, Agonywolf Media held a poll to name a new YouTube channel they intended to launch that would continue the game-riffing style of IGWXP but adopt face cams instead of silhouettes to help distance themselves from MST3K. Robot Co-Op was the winning poll option, and the Agonywolf Media crew began uploading episodes on the new Robot Co-Op YouTube channel.

== Reception ==
The first episode, which series creator Rikk Wolf has stated he's "not a fan of," featured a laugh track, which was ill-received by first-time fans and was quickly dropped by the second episode. Wolf claims the laugh track was solely his idea and was born out of experimentation in ways to differentiate the show from MST3K.

Some have criticized ICWXP for borrowing too heavily from MST3K's premise, branding it a rip-off or plagiarism. This accusation has waned heavily following the resurgence of online MSTing that has occurred following the show's debut, and the fact the show features its own original story line, characters and distinct stylistic approach. Wolf has stated online with regards to this:

"Yeah, well we wanna be the best damn MST3K rip-off we can be! What I'm saying is people who can't get past the fact we have the same basic format are really missing the point. We never set out to revolutionize the art of movie parody. We just thoroughly enjoy trash-talking bad movies, and this format works great for us and has really stuck. I never thought so many people would follow a project done only to gain some film chops we might've never released. Changing it now would basically be suicide for us. Why do that to appease a few sour grapes?"

Also often criticized is the show's long production gaps between releases, such as a four-year gap between Episodes 204 and 205. Unfortunately, these delays are the result of situations mostly out of the hands of the creators. On ICWXP's official site, it is stated that "ICWXP is charity work," and goes on to imply the cast and crew can't "quit their day jobs" to concentrate on the show.

== See also ==
- Mystery Science Theater 3000
- RiffTrax
- Cinematic Titanic
- The Film Crew
