= Anthology of the Killer =

2020–2024 video game series

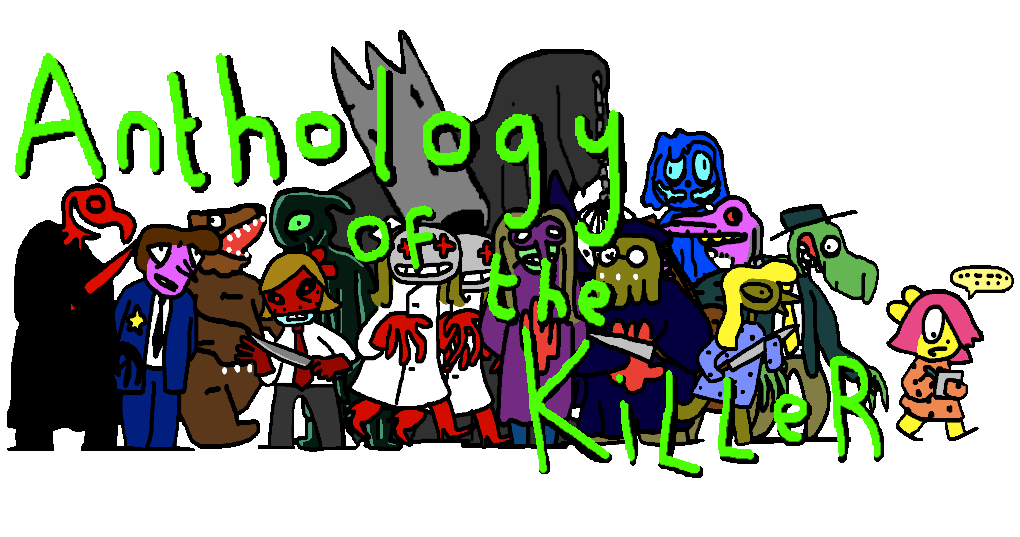
- Developer: Stephen Gillmurphy
- Artists: Stephen Gillmurphy; Alex Degen
- Composer: Tommy Tone
- Engine: Unity
- Platforms: Windows; macOS; Linux; Nintendo Switch; PlayStation 5
- Release: Windows, macOS, Linux; 28 May 2024; Nintendo Switch, PS5; 14 April 2026
- Genre: Horror
- Mode: Single-player

Anthology of the Killer is a series and collection of nine horror comedy games that were developed by Irish independent game developer Stephen Gillmurphy under the pseudonyms "garmentdistrict" and "thecatamites". The nine horror games in the series were released for free on Game Jolt between 2020 and 2024, the first game being Voice of the Killer in December of 2020, before a paid collection of all nine games with bonus content was published in May 2024 for Windows, macOS, and Linux. A port to the Nintendo Switch and PS5 was later released in April of 2026. The series stars a young woman named BB, a college student and resident of a city filled with serial killers who explores her surroundings to find "spooky" content to write about for her zine. In the nine games, she ends up in bizarre and dangerous situations from her encounters with various serial killers and other creatures.

Stephen Gillmurphy created the game series due to his interest in combining humour, horror, surrealism, and mystery to tell bizarre stories about BB as a "recurring heroine". He put particular balance between the humour and horror elements, in part to create a never-ending cycle of the two. The collection's bizarre elements were further enhanced by his game design patterns, in which he combined content like the drawings' features and improvised the game's levels. The Anthology of the Killer series has been praised by critics for its comedy-horror balance and general surrealism, especially from the visuals and humorous dialogue. At the 2024 Independent Games Festival (IGF), it won the Nuovo Award and was also nominated for the Seumas McNally Grand Prize and another award for Excellence in Visual Arts.

== Gameplay ==
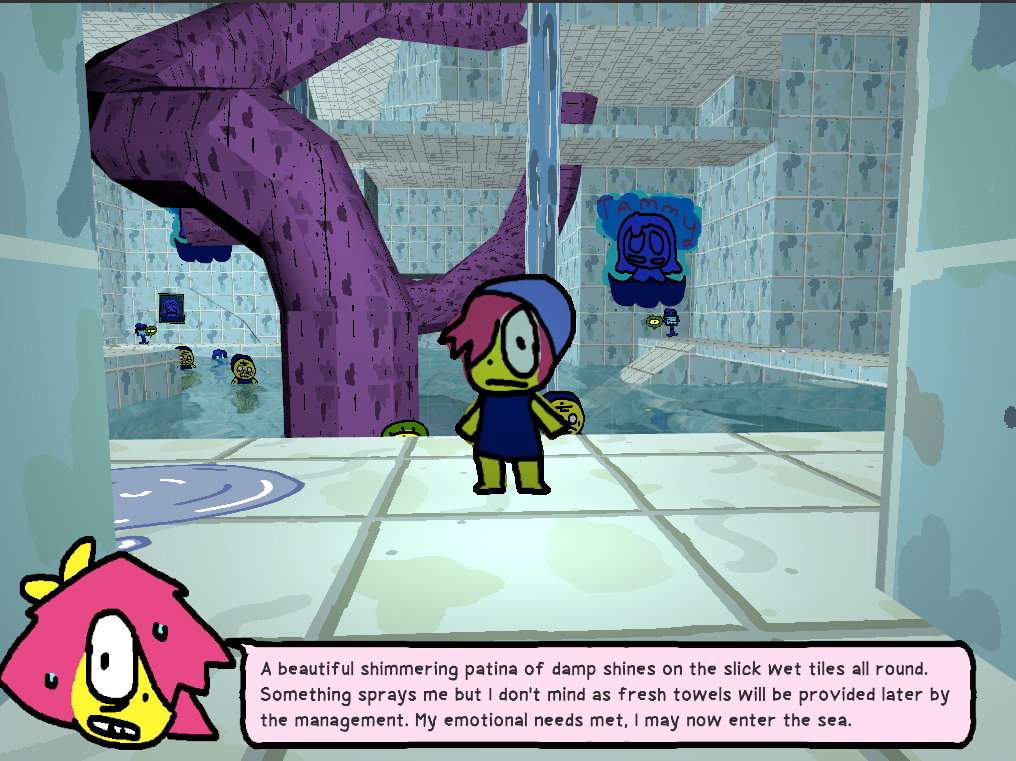
Screenshot of gameplay in Drool of the Killer. The player can activate dialogue from BB and other characters by touching the green speech bubbles with eyes (pictured).

The horror games of the Anthology of the Killer series are primarily walking simulators; the player controls BB to explore environments and walk to hovering bubbles to read dialogue from her and other characters. Periodically, the player character has to escape from pursuing antagonists, though there is no penalty for failure. The player cannot control the game's camera – instead, it follows BB, at times in erratic fashion. As a result, especially in earlier episodes, the player sometimes has to navigate BB through spaces without knowing where to go.

== Plot ==
The games follow a college student named BB, who lives with her sister ZZ in an apartment complex in the serial killer-ridden "XX City". BB writes her own zine focused on eerie happenings, and frequently ends up in dangerous situations as a result of her searching out stories. XX City has an extremely high murder rate, and foremost among its many serial murderers is a supernatural bird-headed figure known only as "the Killer". When not interacting with other characters, BB gives her thoughts on the current situation in a non-continuous monologue.

=== Voice of the Killer ===
BB gets a job as a cold caller at the insurance company Life Contracts, where she notices several strange occurrences, such as all the employees being covered in sheets, a heavy police presence, and a welcoming party for the Killer. That night, BB has a surreal dream and wakes up to a message on her phone telling her the Life Contracts office has burnt down.

=== Hands of the Killer ===
ZZ sends BB to explore the depths of their apartment building to find things to sell online. While doing so, BB stumbles into a night college devoted to creating a new world via murder, led by the elderly Professor Zoo. Though the faculty and students consider real murder kitsch, they mistake BB for a "My First Strangle Victim" doll. While escaping, BB accidentally disables the college's security system, allowing the Killer to enter and murder everyone as BB escapes.

=== Drool of the Killer ===
BB investigates a mysterious bus service that takes her to a swimming centre named "Tammy". BB discovers that the namesake individual of the centre is actually the ghost of a schoolgirl drowned by the Killer, who since her death has been transforming buildings into water parks to fulfil her vision of the new economy. Outraged that Tammy's water is unchlorinated, BB apparently kills Tammy by knocking over a bottle of chlorine onto her.

=== Eyes of the Killer ===
BB is conscripted into the city's immersive theatre production of "Melmo the Wanderer", where she plays "Potsy the Mop Girl", a character who has one line before being killed. Annoyed by her inability to discover more about the plot, as the stage manager believes the actors should know no more than their characters, BB abandons her role and explores backstage to try and find out the identity of her character's murderer. After escaping from murderous policemen dressed in bear costumes, BB tries to inform the theatre's director, Bosso, about this, but discovers she is a member of the same cult that the night college belonged to. Bosso explains that BB did the cult a favour by allowing the college to be wiped out, as the college had diluted the cult's message and the CCTV footage of the massacre made money for the cult when they released it as direct-to-video horror film Bloody Night IV. Bosso reveals that the wealthy owners of the city fund the immersive theatre and the murder of its audience to satisfy their desire for bloodshed. After a climatic scene in the play, where a character resembling the Killer murders characters representing the Sun and Moon, BB is dismissed from the theatre with a twenty-dollar paycheck.

=== Flesh of the Killer ===
BB and three fellow college students (Max, Claude, and Ray) investigate the Museum of Moral Art, a secret museum built in a freeport. The museum prominently features the works of M.T. Lott, who revitalised the genre of "moral art" before being arrested for cannibalism. Venturing deeper into the museum, they discover that M.T. Lott, believing morality too important to leave to humans, created a robot called the Morality Animal. However, incapable of understanding morality outside of its depiction in art, the robot went berserk and now attempts to trap all life within paintings. After the robot traps them in a painting together, the group distracts the robot with a morality-themed play before attacking and destroying it, allowing their escape.

=== Blood of the Killer ===
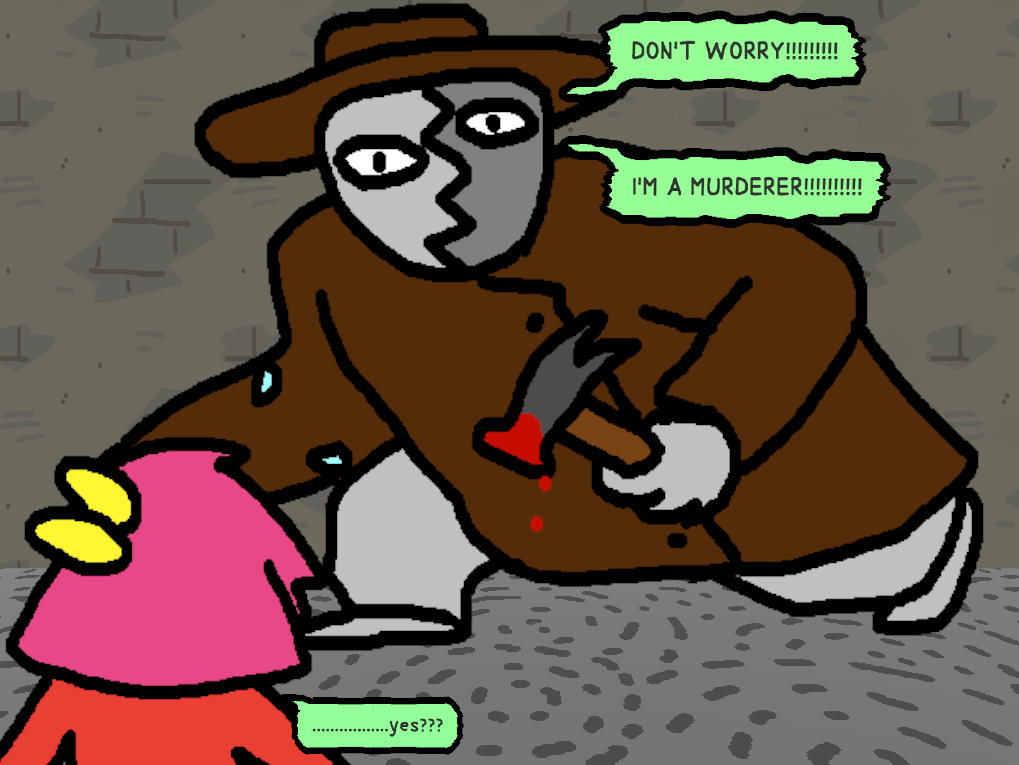
Screenshot of Blood of the Killer, in which BB encounters a serial killer

BB is sent to investigate why a zine distribution established in the nearby River Town stopped sending messages. BB travels to the home of her contact, Clarice, only to find it burnt to the ground. After being redirected for leads to a list of places by XX City serial killer Murderer X, who is later killed by a woman wearing a metal bird mask, BB checks out the various locations in the list, only to discover that most of them have burnt down. BB gives up and tries to return to XX City, but is kidnapped and taken to the self-styled "Concerned Citizen", heir to an abandoned drinky bird factory. BB discovers that the woman in the bird mask is Clarice; Concerned Citizen, believing in a vast conspiracy to pervert recorded history, converted her into a cyborg under his control to kill those who he believes are connected with the conspiracy. He plans to do the same to BB, but the Killer burns down Concerned Citizen's house and kills him, while Clarice, seemingly free of Concerned Citizen's mind control, helps BB escape in the confusion.

=== Ears of the Killer ===
Annoyed by loud music being played in her apartment building, BB goes to confront the source in their apartment, but finds nothing but fleshlike sludge and a 1960s surf record by "Blue D Hans". After a surreal sequence where the walls of the apartment fall away and the Killer places a bird made of the same sludge down BB's throat, BB awakes to find herself on stage – while unconscious, she has become an up-and-coming star in the new music scene of "Crime Wave". Meanwhile, ZZ gets a job at the beachfront headquarters of cult Positive Way LLC. After being sent into the bowels of the complex to find old stock to sell online, ZZ discovers records by Blue D Hans and then finds the cult's leader dead, seemingly murdered by Blue D Hans. Trying to find answers, BB goes to a retro convention after learning that Blue D Hans' record company's remaining assets are being sold off there, and stumbles upon the Weepster, a Crime Wave artist who murders his scene rivals. The Weepster attempts to kill BB, but the bird that was placed in BB's throat possesses her.

Waking up on the beach with the Weepster's clothes lying abandoned next to her, BB reunites with ZZ, who is selling the Blue D Hans records to a buyer who wants to meet them in person. The buyer turns out to be Blue D Hans himself, who explains his philosophy of the "counterworld", a negative of the regular world, to BB, before forcing her and ZZ to perform a beachfront concert with him. BB destroys the bird inside her, Blue D Hans is drowned by a giant wave, and the Crime Wave splinters into endless subfactions.

=== Heart of the Killer ===
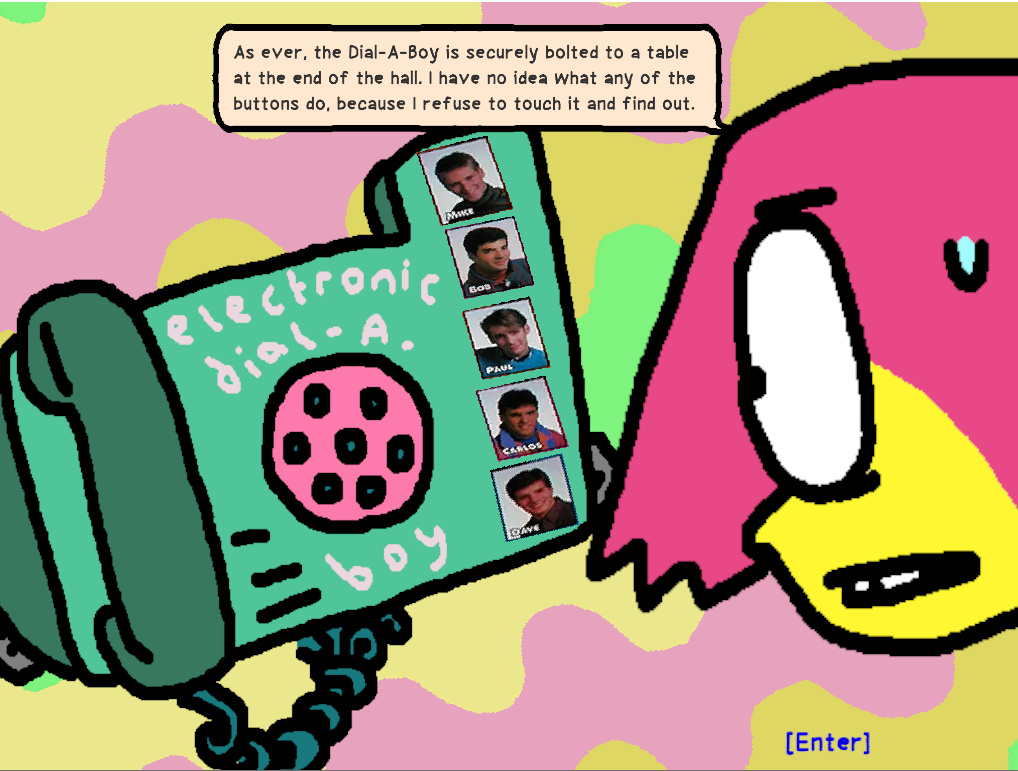
BB and the Dial-A-Boy in Heart of the Killer

BB, working as a mystery shopper, is sent to the Dream Resort, a vast complex seemingly empty of other guests. At the Resort, BB is presented with endless surveys and participates in focus testing where she is asked for her opinions on various bizarre products. Also present in the Resort is the Dial-A-Boy, a toy phone that connects to the attractive young men presented as the Resort's executives, which BB refuses to use. In a bathroom, BB encounters fellow zine author CC, who tells her to meet at the same place the next day to learn the truth behind the Resort. The next day, the bathroom is empty but BB discovers a secret passage behind a mirror, which leads to a surveillance room containing a dossier on government agent "The Spook", as well as instructions on how to escape the Resort, which were actually set up for her to use the Dial-A-Boy.

The Resort's manager, frustrated by BB's refusal to reveal her romantic preferences, has the Spook trap her in a fantasy world named Pumpkin Summer. BB rejects the fantasy's proposed love interest, and back in the real world finds a flyer for an investment meeting, revealing the Dream Resort's real purpose: studying its residents to collect behavioural insights into modern youth fantasies. BB discovers that the Resort's manager is Marcie, formerly famous for a zine she made in the 90s. Marcie reveals that after her second zine was a critical and financial flop, she went into consultancy work. BB and Marcie are swallowed by the Spook, but Marcie stays behind to seek validation and identity from its collected data while BB refuses to and wakes up as the Resort collapses.

=== Face of the Killer ===
BB and her three college friends graduate from college and, amidst the popularity of films featuring a murderous villain version of BB since the release of Bloody Night IV, attend a graduation night costume party in an upper-class neighbourhood. After the party's guests – dressed as serial killers – abruptly start murdering people following a reactionary speech from a theatre actor dressed as 1980s game character Mappy, BB attempts to escape but is captured by Bosso. Bosso explains that the immersive theatre is staging a fictitious coup for an audience of the city's owners. The Mappy actor accidentally shoots himself with a prop gun, believing it to be unloaded, causing Bosso to blame BB for the theatre's troubles and attack her. BB escapes Bosso but is captured by the police, whose leader, Cool Policeman, explains that they loaded the immersive theatre's prop guns to create a pretext for attacking it and seizing control, forcing BB to find the city's owners by exploring the area's bowels. BB slips away while Cool Policeman is confronted by the corpse of Professor Zoo. After Zoo's corpse is repeatedly shot by Cool Policeman, the Killer emerges from behind it and drags BB and Cool Policeman into its world. BB meets the bird from Ears while Cool Policeman is murdered by the Killer. The bird urges BB to shoot the Killer; BB accidentally fires a shot, which ricochets and hits the Killer, causing BB to return to the real world. The ghosts of Blue D Hans and Professor Zoo explain that BB has created the counterworld, though BB perceives no difference from the previous world besides the colour scheme.

In an epilogue, BB, staying with family after the chaos of recent events, writes to ZZ, who is away at a convention. No one aside from BB has noticed that anything has changed, and BB herself can only note a few minor changes, the colours having faded back to normal. Standing in the street, BB signs off by telling ZZ not to worry about her as the murderous BB character from the film stands behind her.

=== Anthology of the Killer ===
The Anthology Of The Killer collection includes a loader to access the games and bonus content; the player walks around an art exhibition themed around the games in first-person and enters rooms themed around each game to play them.

Past the entrances to the games, the player can exit the exhibition and walk down an alley outside, where they encounter "the new BB", as seen in the ending of Face. She expresses displeasure with BB's life, remarking on her desire to come back as a bird the next time she dies. The player passes beneath an apartment where the real BB and ZZ are attempting to begin a career as country singers in order to get out of XX City. Not knowing any country songs, they instead sing a cover of "The Dark End of the Street" as the player leaves.

== Development and release ==
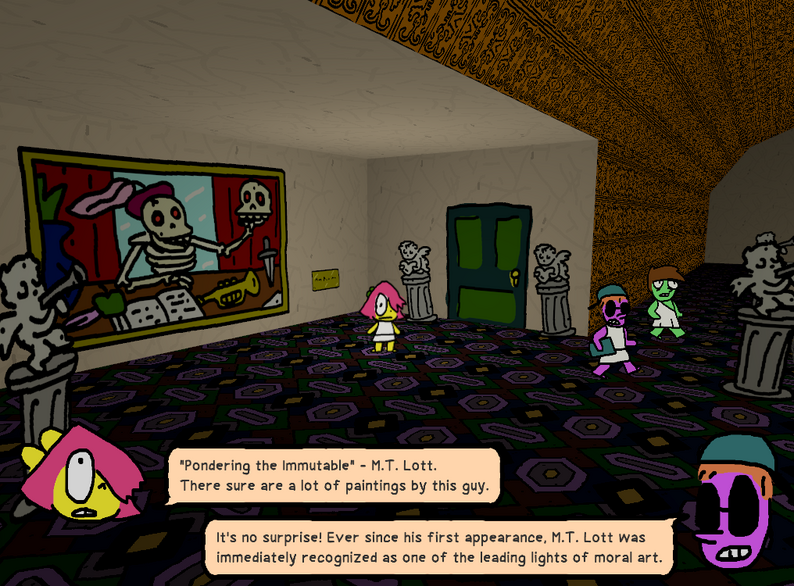
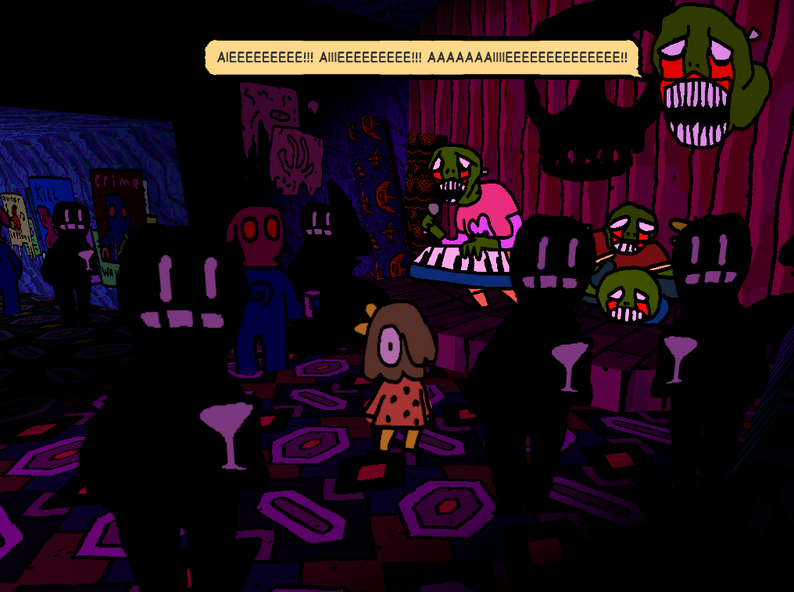
In Anthology of the Killer, BB is placed in drastically different settings in episodes like Flesh of the Killer (left) and Ears of the Killer (right), in part the result of intentional formula changes made to distinguish an episode from the preceding one.

The Anthology of the Killer series was created and developed by the Irish independent game creator Stephen Gillmurphy (also known by the pseudonyms "thecatamites" and "garmentdistrict"), who had previously developed other indie game titles like Space Funeral and 10 Beautiful Postcards. He stated in an interview that he enjoyed making "narrative games", especially serial ones, because of their bizarre story progressions akin to webcomics or the soap opera General Hospital. He cited the horror manga series Uzumaki as one of his game inspirations because of its narrative mix of "Nancy-Drew-ish mystery storytelling and startling surrealist imagery that seemed to belong to a completely different narrative order". His series was also derived from his preference of a "recurring heroine" who has to face different antagonists in different situations. Gillmurphy also credited game content from the Haunted PS1 community as another source of his increased interest in horror. He said that BB was consistently "cypher-esque" in the series but also that she had quirks of her own revealed in each episode like one detail where she was allergic to curtains. Gillmurphy explained that he decided on BB being a zine maker rather than a TV journalist or policewoman because of the overall themes being less serious and intense and also to convey her extreme passion for her hobby to the point of actively putting her own life at risk. The creator brainstormed jokes and dialogue then tested their execution by writing full dialogue on Notepad then using them ingame.

Gillmurphy used the Unity game engine, stating that it allowed him to draw sprites and translate them into a 3D format thanks to a plugin called "Doodle Studio 95". He has used a reference folder of various images like masks and video game monsters for content ideas but would either mangle or combine his doodles. For instance, he combined the designs of the death masks of Mycenae and ruined animal statues to create the Morality Animal, a robotic antagonist from Flesh of the Killer. Gillmurphy had also noted that the surrealist elements of Anthology of the Killer is borrowed from general aspects of B movies, in which the mediums take advantage of using "interesting" visuals. The comedy and horror aspects (horror comedy) as utilized in the game, he explained, helped balance each other and created an ultimately "unsettling" tone due to the extraordinary moments being in a cycle. Gillmurphy also stated that he first thought of jokes then adjusted them to fit within the game's story, added in more jokes while revising his game, and combined locations "arbitrarily" if he felt that individual ones did not suit him. The levels of the games were created from beginning to end and have involved improvision for whenever the ingame executions did not work out. Gillmurphy also scrapped planned storylines from the series, such as one plotline where BB caught a fever and ended up wandering in dreams fueled in part from watching daytime television.

The nine games of the Anthology of the Killer series were released from 2020 to 2024 on Game Jolt for free; the first entry, Voice of the Killer, was released on 3 December 2020. Gillmurphy said that each subsequent episode is different from the previous one based on modifications of features that he disliked or changes in the formula. For instance, he aimed to make Blood Of The Killer more focused on horror, violence, and the outdoors setting compared to the previous entry Flesh Of The Killer. In another interview, he revealed that he made the first two games earlier on but held off on releasing them publicly for a while because he was unsure of what to do with them or how others would react to them. After completing the development of the third entry, he then felt more confidence to publish the games. Following the release of the ninth and final entry, Face Of The Killer (released 5 March 2024), Anthology of the Killer was released as a paid version at Itch.io and Game Jolt on 28 May 2024 for the Windows, macOS, and Linux platforms. The collection, unlike with the standalone entries, has controller support. It was later released on Steam on 8 October 2024. Anthology of the Killer was released for the digital stores for the Nintendo Switch and Playstation 5 on 14 April 2026.

=== Music ===
Tommy Tone composed the soundtrack for the Anthology of the Killer games; he had previously collaborated with Gillmurphy for about 13 years on other indie games. From the very beginning since, he had always used software synthesizers to produce music including for Gillmurphy's games. He stated that he had plenty of freedom in music production for the Anthology of the Killer games. For the series, Tone cited plenty of other musicians as sources of inspiration like Dam-Funk, Sauveur Mallia, Éliane Radigue, and DMX Krew. The composer explained that he was willing to try unconventional methods to produce music for the games, such as one where he hit his bathtub, slowed the sound down, and looped it to a "gradually developing sense of unease".

== Reception ==
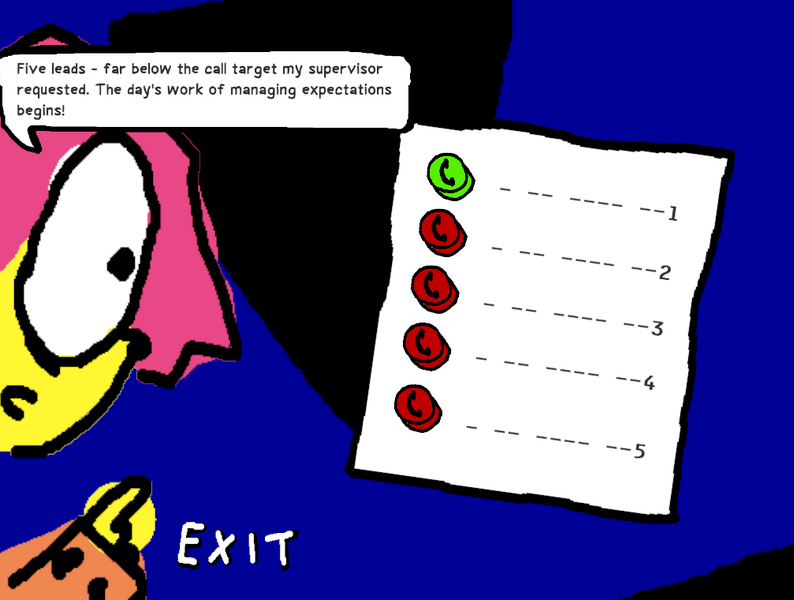
Screenshot of Voice of the Killer. The series has been praised for its humorous dialogue.

Anthology of the Killer won the Nuovo Award and was also nominated for the Seumas McNally Grand Prize and Excellence in Visual Arts at the Independent Games Festival (IGF) in 2024. It was nominated for Destructoid's Best Indie Game of 2024, which described its "dreamlike horror" as effective and the humour as "keeping panic at bay", and was listed as one of the best games of 2024 by Vulture, which acknowledged its "unhinged style" and described it as "a work of singular, outsider brilliance".

Starting from 2021, the series had been well-received by critics for its weird and surreal horror and comedy elements. Mike Wilson of Bloody Disgusting described the plots of both Blood of The Killer and Heart of the Killer as weird, fitting in with the games' visuals and "offbeat humour". Rock Paper Shotgun editor Brendan Caldwell said that he was drawn by "the combination of DIY MS Paint visuals and a surreal comic voice", praising the dialogue from Anthology of the Killer for evoking smiles and frowns. Zoey Handley, in her Destructoid review of the compiled release, praised the game's writing as "sharp and lucid" and filled with "dry, referential sarcasm" but had issues with the camera and stated that the first couple of entries in the series were weaker than the rest, ultimately giving the game 8 out of 10. Lewis Gordon in The Guardian called it "a stunning horror game of uneasy, deliberate flatness". Indie Games Plus reviewer Joel Couture praised the game collection for being both funny and scary, pointing to the visuals as both "rewarding" and "discomforting"; the characters' appearances and the ingame interactions as both "frightening" and "hilarious"; and the dialogue as "sharp and funny, yet also vivid and discomforting".
