= Felvidek (video game) =

2024 role-playing video game

- Developers: Jozef Pavelka; Vlado Ganaj
- Publisher: Tutto Passa
- Engine: RPG Maker MV
- Platform: Windows
- Release: 29 March 2024
- Genre: Role-playing
- Mode: Single-player

Felvidek is a 2024 indie role-playing video game developed by Jozef Pavelka and Vlado Ganaj and published by Tutto Passa. It was released for Windows on 29 March 2024. Developed in RPG Maker MV, the game is set in an alternate history low fantasy version of medieval Slovakia in a region called Felvidék. Its realistic but low-resolution and heavily dithered monotone graphics are styled after those of fifth-generation consoles.

== Gameplay ==
While Felvidek describes itself as a JRPG, there are no character levels, with all battles being scripted and story-based. The game's first-person battles also depict combat animations from that perspective.

== Plot ==
Gameplay screenshot.

The game's protagonist is Pavol, an alcoholic knight who confronts an invasion of Hussite pillagers and Ottoman spies, as well as more surreal and fantastical monsters.

At the start of the story, Pavol constantly drinks to distract himself from the sorrow caused by his wife Paula leaving him. Living in a castle owned by Jozef, the local lord, Pavol wakes up from a drunken stupor one day and sees a great fire ravaging an old castle on the horizon, as depicted in the game's opening cutscene. This kickstarts his adventure as he is dispatched by Jozef to find out the root of this incident, being joined by companions like the abstemious monk Matej, old war friend and inquisitor Adam, thieving Gypsy woman Ida, or even Jozef himself. Initially getting into conflict with Hussite troops raiding the countryside but gradually facing more and more monstrous enemies, Pavol and his crew eventually unravel a conspiracy around a Zoroastrian cult worshipping Zurvan and Ahriman, which Paula is revealed to have joined. This cult builds its power by illegally smuggling an unfamiliar substance known as qahwah, which is actually coffee. Discovering otherworldly Lovecraftian nests of monster flesh underneath the local church as well as the old castle, Pavol's crew eventually tracks down and battles Marek, a knight revealed to be the cult leader, killing him and ending the cult's influence on the land.

The game makes extensive use of tongue-in-cheek Slovak popular culture references, such as the item "Frndžalica", an alcoholic beverage that causes explosive damage when spat at enemies, referencing a drink of the same name in the 1975 Slovak comedy film Pacho, hybský zbojník ("Pacho, the Brigand of Hybe"). Several NPCs are also based on Slovak public figures, such as a village drunkard and a high-ranking cultist being parodies of politicians Andrej Danko and Vladimír Mečiar, respectively.

== Reception ==
The game was positively received overall, with critics praising its unique setting, story and characters. Its short length and basic gameplay had a more mixed reception. Nic Reuben of Rock Paper Shotgun compared the game's dark, horror-adjacent tone to that of Fear & Hunger. Calling it "raw, strange and brilliant", he stated that the game was the perfect length, though he wished it were more nonlinear. Ted Litchfield of PC Gamer described it as "like Baldur's Gate on the Game Boy", also comparing its environmental art to Return of the Obra Dinn or the original Nosferatu film. He called it "a more grounded, sober sort of low fantasy", but with "glimpses of more fantastical elements". Meanwhile, Rollin Bishop of GamesRadar+ said that the game "really speaks to the kid in me that desires to play nothing but somewhat clunky PS1 RPGs".

SECTOR.sk gave a mixed review to the game, saying it had an excellent story, visuals and audio, but suffered from being overly short without depth to its gameplay.
