= Black Souls (video game series) =

Japanese video game series

Black souls
- Promotional artwork
- Genres: Role-playing, psychological horror, eroge
- Developers: Eeny, meeny, miny, moe?
- Publishers: Eeny, meeny, miny, moe?; Otaku Plan
- Creator: Sushi Hero Toro
- Platform: Windows
- First release: Red Hood's Woods; September 25, 2016
- Latest release: Black Souls II; November 10, 2018

Black Souls (stylized in all caps) is a psychological horror eroge role-playing video-game series created by independent Japanese doujin soft developer Eeny, meeny, miny, moe?. The series draws inspiration from Dark Souls and various fairy tales (notably Alice in Wonderland), incorporating elements of gore, dark fantasy, and gothic aesthetics.

Initially distributed through DLsite, both Black Souls I and Black Souls II were released on Steam in 2025 in a heavily censored version. The series has gained a cult following and received positive critical acclaim for its story, atmosphere, artwork, and combat. A fourth installment titled Dead Red Hood has been announced.

== Gameplay ==
Gameplay screenshot of Black Souls II, in which the protagonist is fighting a boss named Headhunting Beast

Black Souls is a JRPG series that uses a top-down perspective. Battles are governed by a turn-based system. The developer describes it as "tactical and tense ATB combat". The player can act when their action gauge fills up. In Black Souls I, once players recruit the heroines to their party, they can summon them during battle. To dodge incoming attacks, they can use the Evade skill. It consumes low-cost energy. For Black Souls II, it consumes none but has a seventy-percent success rate. Because players "could just spam skills with a high crit rate and beat almost every boss" in Black Souls I, Black Souls II introduced cooldowns and more enemies with multiple resistances. The player can collect "souls" scattered throughout the world while exploring to enhance their abilities. Under an open-world map, bonfires act as checkpoints that fully restore health and enable fast travel between them. Players can select to be a Knight, Thief, or Sorcerer as a starting class in Black Souls I. Black Souls II expands with six new classes, including Cleric, Warrior, Templar, Hunter, Explorer, and Fluffy.

With multiple endings, branching paths, and a progression system that allows players to shape their protagonist in different ways, player choice matters as well. Players need to complete the game multiple times to uncover new content. Normally, all NPCs can be killed, but doing so in Black Souls II will lower players' value of SEN. If the player's SEN value drops too low, eerie phenomena will occur, such as the background music disappearing and residents beginning to speak in incomprehensible words.

== Setting and plot ==
The main playable character in Red Hood's Woods is Red Hood, who is based on the fairy tale character of the same name. For Black Souls I and Black Souls II, the player controls an undead male protagonist named by the player. Black Souls I is set in the "Lost Empire," which is described as "a world suffocating under a mysterious mist that transforms humans into monsters". Following the events of its predecessor, Black Souls II takes place in a seemingly desolate world filled to the brim with horrifying monsters.

=== Red Hood's Woods ===
Red Hood enters a fantastical world through a mirror, where she journeys with a wolf named Poro, encounter several monsters, and confronts the memory of being sexually abused by her grandfather. After killing him, she rejects Poro's offer to ignore the truth and finds her grandmother, who tries to kill her upon learning of her husband's death. After defeating her, Red Hood awakens.

=== Black Souls I ===
At a library, Alice confirms the protagonist's name and class before she is killed. The protagonist awakens in a prison, where the Holy Knight Jeanne rescues him. During the escape, she is burned alive by the dragon Helkaiser, the protagonist's future archenemy. Waking up again in the Holy Forest, the protagonist goes on an adventure to prevent the spread of a mist that transforms people into monsters. Players can recruit ten heroines in total, including Leaf and Red Hood. During the adventure, many fairies mention a name, Mary Sue. Eventually, The protagonist meets five demonic princesses, each of whom rules her own land, which is overrun with demon beasts. He must choose to enter a covenant with them or slay them in battle, thereby changing the fate of the Lost Empire.

Twenty-four different endings are possible, depending on the player's actions. Ending C reveals that Leaf is in fact Mary Sue, who tampered with everyone's happy endings. In Ending D, the protagonist joins the Black Trial and receives various requests from Baphomet, the group's leader. After completing all the requests, the protagonist sends Baphomet to the Holy Forest. After destroying the Holy Forest, Baphomet imprisons Leaf, claiming that she does not want to play the role of the "archdemon". After being defeated by the protagonist and Leaf, Baphomet reveals that she is Leaf's mother. Leaf then laughs and offers to remain lovers with the protagonist forever. Suddenly, Alice appears, clapping, and approaches the protagonist.

=== Black Souls II ===
The game's story takes place immediately after Ending D of Black Souls I. In the prologue, the player is asked to define Alice's role as mother, daughter, or little sister. The protagonist then enjoys a fleeting happy moment with the Alice of his memory. However, while he sleeps, she vanishes, the backdrop collapses, and he plummets into a falling room. After dying for the first time, he gains access to the Library Dream, the game's main hub. His quest to find Alice in Wonderland begins, but he soon discovers this realm descending into madness. Concurrently, he himself grows increasingly obsessed with all things related to Alice. During his adventure, the protagonist may kill, pledge vows to, or violate various heroines, 45 in total. Some of those he rapes later appear within the Library Dream's dungeon.

The base game has eight endings. After many cycles and variation of choice, the protagonist in the final story route sees through the illusions and attempts to break free. This will allow him to enter the Little Girl's Nightmare, a secret area. The Crawling One—the Outer God who breached Elysium and brought the protagonist to Wonderland—appears and grows enraged when the player perceives Wonderland's true nature. Progressing through the area will result in meeting Red Hood and Leaf, the player will then be given the choice to side with one of them against the other.

In Ending G, after the protagonist sides with Red Hood to kill Leaf and ultimately defeats the Crawling One, the garden begins to collapse. While fleeing, Red Hood and Poro become trapped by debris in a hallway. The protagonist then encounters the soul of Alice Liddell, who has escaped the Crawling One's grasp following its defeat. Managing to escape the garden, he is reunited with a one-armed Red Hood in the outside world. However, after the story concludes, he is transported once again to the Library Dream. This indicates that the story has not truly ended.

Shortly after ending G of the original game, the third downloadable content (DLC), Crown of the Lion and Unicorn, introduces three additional endings. In the Heartbroken ending, the player ultimately encounters the Grand Guignol. She is revealed to be an artificial, mechanical Outer God who controls Wonderland. It is precisely because of the Grand Guignol (who is in fact Mary Sue's power of creation given form and therefore intrinsically linked with the protagonist) that the protagonist was pulled back into Wonderland in the previous ending. After defeating the Grand Guignol and breaking the endless loop of cycles, the protagonist is helped by Red Hood as he attempts to finally escape.

However, when the Crawling One intervenes in a mad frenzy, the protagonist severs his own arm to allow Red Hood to get away. The Crawling One encompasses him, attempting to completely overwrite his mind so that he thinks only of them. Yet, a fragment of Alice extends herself, leading him out of the Crawling One's grasp and back to reality as the story reaches its final conclusion. Red Hood lives out the rest of her days in apparent peace with the protagonist until her death at the age of twenty, due to a curse placed on her by Mary Sue.

== Development ==
"So I decided to make a dark-themed game, but since I’d be selling it on DLsite, I needed to include erotic content too... I struggled a lot, full of shame, and finally completed my debut title, Red Hood's Woods. … And then one day, Red Hood's Woods got featured on a certain review site, and that made me so happy, I decided to create again."

— Sushi Hero Toro

The series is produced by the doujin circle Eeny, meeny, miny, moe?. The team's core member, Sushi Hero Toro, is known for creating Touhou Igyoukyo, a Touhou Project fan-made series featuring horror and grotesque elements. They created the game using the RPG Maker VX Ace engine. Dark Souls has been the subject of many parodies and references in the series. The setting of this series, which is noted for gore, violence, and psychological horror, is inspired by gothic aesthetics, Victorian architecture, Lovecraftian horror, and dark fantasy. Drawing inspiration from Alice's Adventures in Wonderland and Through the Looking-Glass, the series mixes elements of fairy tales with the Cthulhu Mythos. In an interview, Sushi Hero Toro stated that Alice's Adventures in Wonderland is their favorite fairy tale. They especially referenced the Grimm tales, Call of Cthulhu and a Cthulhu-based tabletop role-playing game, and used the "fear of the unknown" theory for creature design.

The series began with Red Hood's Woods (紅ずきんの森), which was released on DLsite on September 25, 2016, followed by Black Souls I – Black Fairy Tales and the Five Demonic Princesses– (BLACKSOULS -黒の童話と五魔姫-, BLACKSOULS - Kuro no Dōwa to Gomaki-) on July 30, 2017, and Black Souls II -A Wonderland for My Beloved- (BLACKSOULSII -愛しき貴方へ贈る不思議の国-, BLACKSOULS II -Itoshiki Anata e Okuru Fushigi no Kuni-) on November 10, 2018. Three DLC add-ons for Black Souls II were released: God of the Deep Ocean, Old King of the Chess, and Crown of the Lion and Unicorn.

Published by Otaku Plan, Black Souls I and Black Souls II were respectively released on Steam on August 16 and November 28, 2025. This version is heavily censored, and players who want to experience the full, explicit version need to download an adult patch from the publisher's website. The 4th installment of the series, Dead Red Hood, has been announced and is in development.

== Reception ==
Black Souls I gained underground recognition for its grim take on fairy tales and Souls-like atmosphere. Notebookcheck called it an experimental RPG that "treads the line between really strong themes and traditional role-playing." Reviewers for the Taiwanese gaming news website 4Gamers highlighted that the game has sold over 40,000 copies on DLsite, and praised its considerable player freedom along with its grotesque and disturbing elements. Mohsen Baqery of Game Rant praised the game for its pixel art and storytelling, and noted its bold depiction of violence and sexual harassment. He stated that few Dark Souls-inspired games "have been as edgy or as transgressive as the Black Souls series".

Following its predecessor, Black Souls II has been extremely popular since its release, also selling over 40,000 units on DLsite. It reached first place in DLsite's overall monthly ranking. Comicbook.com described the game as "dive into that brings adult themes, in-depth storytelling, and engaging gameplay". A reviewer for 4Gamers praised the game's unsettling atmosphere, its reinterpretation of Alice in Wonderland, and the enhanced psychedelic style and psychological horror compared to its predecessor. Matthew Danielson from Screen Rant commented that "BLACK SOULS II may not be for the faint of heart, but its challenging combat, intriguing story, and terrifying atmosphere makes it a game on Steam worth trying". Its Chinese-language version won the Bronze Award in the 2023 DLsite Best Chinese Doujin Works Awards. Mohsen Baqery praised Black Souls II's high replay value and recommended the game to Fear & Hunger fans.

The series has inspired many fan games, some of which have been launched on Steam.
