= Middens (video game) =

2012 indie role-playing video game

- Developer: John Clowder
- Composer: John Clowder
- Engine: RPG Maker XP
- Platforms: Windows, MacOS
- Release: September 9, 2012
- Genres: Role-playing, Walking simulator
- Mode: Single-player

Middens is a 2012 role-playing video game developed in RPG Maker XP by John Clowder. (Note: Under the online handle "myformerselves") Set in a realm made up of parts of other universes called the Rift, players control a character referred to as the Time Nomad, who meets a sentient revolver, who forces him into killing a vast majority of the Rift's population as a means of "cleansing" it.

Middens is noted for its surreal art style, tone and its criticism of violence in video games. Two sequels, Gingiva and Where They Cremate the Roadkill were released in 2013 and 2017 respectively.

== Gameplay ==
The player controls the Nomad and can explore freely across the Rift. The Nomad has the potential to most kill NPCs encountered in the game by equipping Genie (the revolver) from the inventory and firing on them. NPCs killed stay dead and do not respawn. Some NPCs die immediately upon being attacked, while others trigger a battle. Battles play out like a tradition JRPG, with the Nomad being able to summon three companions during battles - Lam, Yam and Om - "personified agents" that represent regions of his body's energy. Most NPCs are not hostile to the Nomad unless attacked, although some may become hostile depending on the count of Nothings, which are obtained by winning battles by killing enemies. Occasionally when entering a new area, the player will be prompted to answer a series of philosophical questions by Genie before continuing.

== Development ==
Middens was the debut game of its developer John Clowder. He chose RPG Maker as the engine to develop the game as it would be less time-consuming and convenient for him, it took him three months to develop it. He stated he was inspired by Yume Nikki and Space Funeral when working on the game.

Middens was developed and composed almost entirely by Clowder over the course of three months. Initially, he had another composer working on the game, but a "falling out" between him and the composer happened during development, leading to him scoring the game alone.

== Reception ==
Middens has received generally positive reviews. Jay Is Games's John Bardinelli said "Calling this adventure/RPG "surreal" is a bit like saying a hike to the moon would be a bit of a trek", saying the game would "delight and shock" players. Writing for Rock Paper Shotgun, Porpentine commended the uniqueness of the game's "brilliant, alien world" and stated the game's writing was "consistently interesting", "sly, playful [and] sinister". Eurogamer praised the game as "unlike anything else out there" comparing the game to 90s role-playing games and surrealist art. Comparing the game to the work of Viktor Shklovsky's discourse on defamiliarization, Owen Vince of Arcade Review stated the game "does its level best to unnerve and bewitch you with how it looks and sounds" with the purpose of exploring the "unfamiliar spaces occupied in the reality of the lives of routine things". Describing the game as "open-ended" and "more overly sinister" than Clowder's other works, William Huang of Pelican Magazine praised the game's "fascinating symbolism", open-ended exploration and character design, although found the game's music and combat "slightly underwhelming" and "formulaic" due to the use of the RPG Maker engine. Felipe Pepe stated "Dense, divisive and absolutely unique, Middens remains one of the most visually striking RPG Maker games".
