= Grimm's Hollow =

2019 video game

- Developer: Ghosthunter
- Publisher: Ghosthunter
- Composers: Nat Wesley, Bruno Buglisi
- Engine: RPG Maker 2003
- Platform: Microsoft Windows
- Release: October 31, 2019
- Genres: Adventure, role-playing
- Mode: Single-player

Grimm's Hollow is a 2019 role-playing video game developed by Mahum Najam under the alias Ghosthunter. It was released as freeware on Steam and Itch.io on Halloween for Microsoft Windows.

== Gameplay ==
The player controls a singular player character, Lavender, as she navigates through the Hollow (the game's central town) and ghost caverns. Like most RPG Maker games, maps are two-dimensional and in a top-down perspective. At the Hollow, the player can interact with the townsfolk, purchase food items that replenish the player's health at the Bakery, and progress the main plot. The player collects experience points (called Spirit Energy) by fighting ghosts, and these points can be used as currency to purchase food or progress their skill tree. Combat takes place in ghost caverns, where an encounter will start if the player interacts with a moving ghost.

There are four endings depending on gameplay, whether or not Lavender beats the final battle, and whether or not she reaches her maximum level.

== Plot ==
The story starts with Lavender, a young girl who awakens in a bed in the afterlife. Surrounding her are balloons and skull-masked figures in purple robes. Their leader, a non-human entity called Grimm, informs her that she has died and reincarnated as a Reaper in the game's town, the Hollow. The dead in this world can reincarnate as ghosts, or Reapers, a type of psychopomp who defeats ghosts. Lavender does not believe Grimm's story, and starts to think of escape as soon as he leaves. However, a ghost appears and tells her that her brother, Timmy, has arrived with her in the Hollow. The game begins with Lavender embarking on a journey to find her missing brother and return home.

== Development ==
Grimm's Hollow was conceived in June 2018, described as "inspired by a longing for a short and sweet RPG experience". The game was developed in the RPG Maker 2003 game engine. Krita was used for the backgrounds and Microsoft Paint was used for the characters, tilesets, and battle designs.

== Release ==
Grimm's Hollow was scheduled to release on October 31, 2019. A DLC pack known as Pocket Goods was released on June 1, 2021, including a pocket book that contains illustrations and concept art.

== Reception ==
The game received positive reviews and currently holds one of the Top 10 spot in the 150 best Steam games of all time tagged with RPG Maker.
