= Jimmy and the Pulsating Mass =

2018 video game

- Developer: Starseed Games
- Engine: RPG Maker VX Ace
- Platforms: Windows; PlayStation 4; PlayStation 5; Xbox Series X/S; Nintendo Switch
- Release: August 7, 2018 (Windows); February 5, 2026 (Consoles)
- Genre: Role-playing
- Mode: Single-player

Jimmy and the Pulsating Mass is a 2018 role-playing video game by Starseed Games, a solo indie developer based in Austin, Texas, and published for PC on August 7, 2018 by Starseed, and by Electric Airship on PlayStation 5, PlayStation 4, Xbox Series X and Series S, and Nintendo Switch on February 5, 2026.

Jimmy and the Pulsating Mass was inspired by Super Nintendo games such as EarthBound and Final Fantasy V. It has been described as a mixture of horror, humor, and a "coming-of-age" story in which the main character and his brother leave home on a typical errand and stumble into an adventure to save a dream world and its inhabitants.

== Gameplay ==
Jimmy and the Pulsating Mass is a turn-based role-playing game based on classic Japanese role-playing games (JRPGs). The game features typical JRPG concepts, including finding new party members throughout the story, upgrading equipment, and leveling up characters by gaining experience points through combat, which includes physical attacks and spells. The game uses red and green exclamation marks to express whether a battle can be skipped, with a green mark allowing the player to avoid fighting weaker enemies. The main player character, Jimmy, is able to transform into certain enemies after fighting them, such as a slime, which also allows bypassing certain obstacles.

== Development ==
Developer Kasey Ozymy stated in an interview with Startmenu that he grew up playing Japanese RPGs, noting that while he read and watched TV and film, on "an average day after school I'd play games for four hours or so. I exhausted the [PlayStation] and SNES JRPG libraries at that time." Ozymy eventually began using RPG Maker to develop his own games, starting with The God of Crawling Eyes, developed for a 2013 contest, and continued to make smaller games using the software.

Jimmy and the Pulsating Mass was also developed using RPG Maker, and leans on the horror genre, with Ozymy stating that he is a fan of the genre, and has included Easter eggs throughout the game.

== Reception ==
The game currently has a score of 86 out of 100 based on critic reviews on review aggregator Metacritic. Sam Wachter of RPGamer writes that while it has some issues in terms of console stability, and a somewhat high level of difficulty at times, it is still "intriguing," and that players will likely enjoy playing for "the absurdity, humour, and sharp writing that will keep them exploring." Athanasios Aravositas from Cubed3 notes that the game is somewhat repetitive and requires some level of grinding, but still recommends it to RPG fans.
