= Thecatamites =

Irish video game designer

Stephen Gillmurphy
- Born: Dublin, Ireland
- Years active: 2009 – present
- Known for: Creating the video games Space Funeral and Anthology of the Killer
- Website: harmonyzone.org

Stephen Gillmurphy, known professionally as thecatamites, is an Irish independent video game developer known for publishing short independent freeware games, including Space Funeral and Anthology of the Killer. His games are typified by the use of self-drawn, mixed-media graphics and offbeat, satirical tone. Described as publishing "weird outsider games," Gillmurphy has received positive reception from independent game outlets.

== Career ==
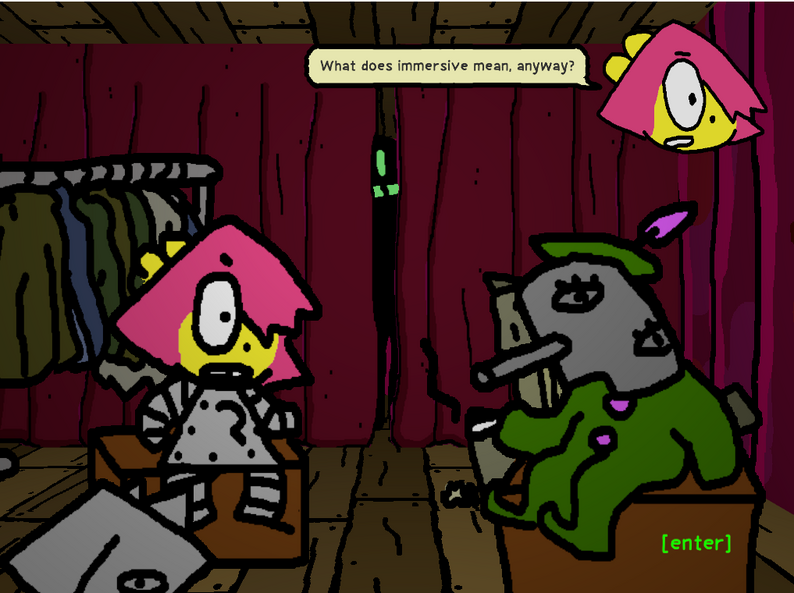
Screenshot of the 2021 game Eyes of the Killer, part of the 2024 game collection Anthology of the Killer

Gillmurphy first started making games in 2008 using RPG Maker after exposure to the software in secondary school. He cites the independent games Wilfred The Hero by Brandon Abley and Psychosomnium by Jonatan Söderström as major influences to create his own art in video games, which are often composed of diverse handmade materials including Lego, paper cutouts, clay figurines, and scanned drawings. He has worked with a preference to developing short-form games, as illustrated by his 2014 compilation 50 Short Games, due to the shortness "giving (the games) a larger range" and reflecting the "practical impulse to compress and avoid unnecessary work." Gillmurphy states this approach was influenced by his experience with game jams, stating positive experiences with "shared constraints that kind of sync you up with other people."

Gillmurphy has distributed his games on several websites, including under the names Games 4 Schools, Mystery Zone, and Harmony Zone, the latter of which he has used to publish commercial titles including 50 Short Games. He has also published critical essays on Tumblr under the handle My Friend Pokey.

In 2020, Gillmurphy began publishing the Anthology of the Killer comedic horror series on GameJolt under the name garmentdistrict.

=== Recognition ===
Gillmurphy's work has received praise for its unique method of composition and unusual tone. Game Jolt praised Gillmurphy as possessing "one of the most exciting and original bodies of work in gaming," describing his games as "funny, surreal, boundary-pushing, and full of wonder over the possibilities of videogames and the worlds they can create." Brendan Caldwell of Rock Paper Shotgun praised Gillmurphy's writing, stating that it possesses an "odd humor [..] that lies somewhere between absurdity and academia," and complimented his worldbuilding as "self-contained asylums of weirdness." Writing for Game Developer, Mike Rose stated that he "isn't like other developers," noting "the underlying mechanics of play will often force you into the sort of silly and sometimes uncomfortable territory that video games simply don't explore." Anthology Of The Killer received the 2024 Independent Games Festival Nuovo Award.

== Personal life ==
Gillmurphy was born in Inchicore, a suburb of Dublin, Ireland, and studied as a mathematics student. In 2012, Gillmurphy briefly worked in a full-time role as an insurance broker in Dublin. He is noted as being reticent to discuss his personal life on the Internet, preferring to "stay in the shadows."

== Works ==
Under the names thecatamites, Harmony Zone, and garmentdistrict, Gillmurphy has self-published several independent games, including:

Year	Title	Ref.
2009	Biggles on Mars	
2009	Paul Moose in Space World	
2009	Bubsy The Bobcat in "RIP Van Bubsy" Starring Bubsy	
2009	Twenties Flappers Vs The Mummy	
2009	Ghost Voyage	
2010	Veggie Tales 3D	
2010	Too Many Kittens	
2010	The New Adventures of Billy The Kid	
2010	The Astonishing Captain Skull	
2010	Space Funeral	
2011	Murder Dog IV: Trial of the Murder Dog	
2011	Crime Zone	
2011	Drill Killer	
2012	Super Eagle	
2012	Jungle Max	
2012	Goblet Grotto	
2013	Mystery Channel	
2014	50 Short Games	
2014	Harmony Summer Hardpack Tape 11-in-1	
2017	Mouse Corp	
2017	Magic Wand	
2019	10 Beautiful Postcards	
2020	Voice of the Killer	
2020	Hands of the Killer	
2021	Drool of the Killer	
2021	Eyes of the Killer	
2021	Flesh of the Killer	
2021	Blood of the Killer	
2022	Ears of the Killer	
2023	Heart of the Killer	
2024	Face of the Killer	
2024	Anthology of the Killer	
2026	International Obsession	
