= Always Sometimes Monsters =

2014 video game

- Developer: Vagabond Dog
- Publishers: Devolver Digital; Vagabond Dog (Switch)
- Designer: Justin Amirkhani
- Programmer: Jake Reardon
- Artists: Sarah Dario; Kelvin Put; Jessica Alves; Victor Cueva Rodriguez; Donovan Liu; Luis Emilio Aceves Amaya
- Writer: Justin Amirkhani
- Composer: Laser Destroyer Team
- Engine: RPG Maker VX Ace
- Platforms: Android; iOS; Linux; Microsoft Windows; OS X; PlayStation 4; Nintendo Switch
- Release: Windows; 21 May 2014; OS X, Linux; 8 January 2015 iOS, Android; 28 May 2015; PlayStation 4; 10 October 2017; Nintendo Switch; 8 April 2021
- Genre: Role-playing
- Mode: Single-player

Always Sometimes Monsters is a 2014 role-playing video game developed by Canadian studio Vagabond Dog and published by Devolver Digital for Microsoft Windows. A later update using the MonoGame framework brought the game to OS X and Linux on 8 January 2015, iOS and Android on 28 May 2015 and PlayStation 4 on 10 October 2017. After Vagabond Dog acquired the publishing rights to the game, a port to the Nintendo Switch were released.

The game puts players in the role of an author who receives notice that the love of their life is marrying someone else across the country within a month. After being evicted from their apartment on the east coast, players then head to the west coast in order to intercept the wedding and win back the love they lost.

== Gameplay ==
As the game starts, players are introduced to their character through a narrative sequence that allows the selection of their character and love interest. The player's relationship with their love interest can be both straight or gay, depending on their choice. From there, the game begins its narrative, told through text windows supported by character portraits. Players make choices in dialogue and in action to alter the course of the story and change the fate of their protagonist.

Players can walk around to explore city environments, interact with NPCs, and find the means to earn money so they may progress to the next location. This often means taking repetitive odd jobs for low pay, or compromising a concept of morality.

The game plays out over a span of 30 in-game days, with time progressing through morning, day, and night as activities and events are completed. Choosing how to spend time during the journey is a key component of the game, as some options disable others.

== Reception ==
Reception

Aggregate score
Aggregator	Score
Metacritic	(PS4) 80/100 (PC) 73/100 (iOS) 60/100

Review scores
Publication	Score
Eurogamer	(PC) 9/10
GameRevolution	(PC) 9/10
GameSpot	(PC) 5/10
Gamezebo	(PC) 3.5/5
GameZone	(PC) 7/10
Hardcore Gamer	(PC) 3/5
Joystiq	(PC) 4/5
PC Gamer (UK)	80%
Polygon	(PC) 8/10
RPGamer	(PC) 3/5
TouchArcade	(iOS) 3/5

The PlayStation 4 version received "favourable" reviews, while the PC and iOS versions received "mixed or average reviews" according to the review aggregation website Metacritic.

== Sequel ==
A sequel, Sometimes Always Monsters, was announced on 13 August 2015. Although announced for 2016, it was eventually released on 2 April 2020 for Windows.
