= Sometimes Always Monsters =

2020 video game

- Developer: Vagabond Dog
- Publisher: Vagabond Dog
- Engine: RPG Maker
- Platform: Windows
- Release: April 2, 2020
- Genre: Role-playing
- Mode: Single-player

Sometimes Always Monsters is a 2020 role-playing video game developed and published by Canadian studio Vagabond Dog for Windows. It is the sequel to the 2014 video game Always Sometimes Monsters.

Following events from Always Sometimes Monsters, the player is a recently married author who joins a cross-country bus tour to promote their next novel. Along the way, there are vicious rumours claiming that the author is a total fraud. Players journey through five unique cities, meet fans and critics alike, and make friends with fellow busmates. Player choices help to unravel the conspiracy laid against the player character.

== Gameplay and features ==
Players can either import a complete save file from the first game to continue their story or can start a fresh new game that follows a unique plotline able to be played standalone.

Nearly all of the game's content is optional, including the entirety of the primary narrative giving players great freedom to shape their story.

== Development ==
During the development cycle it was presented at some events. In 2015, it was presented at the PAX Prime Indie Megabooth. It was shown at PAX East in 2020.

The game was made using RPG Maker. The game was set for release in 2016, though it was delayed until April 2020.

In 2017, the "Patience Test" preview was released to a small group of fans. It included the entire beginning of the game.

On the long development time Vagabond Dog stated on the fourth anniversary of the launch of the previous game, "The project has turned into something far larger than we ever realized it could be, advancing almost every aspect of our formula with more depth and complexity."

Initially to be published by Devolver Digital the developer-publisher relationship was ended amicably in February 2020 citing overhead costs and launch concerns.
