= John Clowder =

American video game designer

- Born: United States
- Years active: 2012-2017
- Known for: Middens, Gingiva and Where They Cremate the Roadkill

John Clowder, also known as revolverwinds, myformerselves, or Takamo, is an American artist and independent video game developer whose work has been described as collage and surrealist. Clowder published three games, Middens, Gingiva and Where They Cremate the Roadkill, using RPG Maker, and have been described as representative of a trend of experimental games made using the engine.

== Career ==
Clowder has worked across media in illustration, writing and game design, as well as having tutored in gaming and digital arts at college. Clowder's games, including Middens and Gingiva, are typified by their use of collage and surrealist imagery, with additional watercolor art from collaborator and artist Shaina Nordlund. To integrate collage design in his games, Clowder used cut-up quotes from random public figures in his dialog, and cited an interest in the reuse of "morbid medical texts, bone atlases and zoographic curios" as visual references. Clowder's games, which were created with RPG Maker, have been cited as a range of notable experimental games made using the engine.

=== Works ===
Screenshot of Middens, showing Clowder's use of collage and surrealist imagery.

Clowder's debut game, Middens, was released on GameJolt under the pseudonym Takamo on 13 September 2012. He stated Middens was an artistic experiment to explore collage and pixel art within the medium of a video game. A sequel, Gingiva, a spiritual successor to Middens, was published by Clowder on GameJolt on 13 September 2012.

Clowder's third game, Where They Cremate the Roadkill, was published on Steam on 30 September 2017, following a successful Kickstarter project in 2015 to fund the game. The game is similarly an action-role-playing game in which players travel between three dimensions as a spirit tasked with killing bodies to collect souls for the devil, whilst avoiding being caught. Clowder stated development of the game was created over a longer process, and was designed with a multi-layered narrative, "like the concentric rings in a tree or stacked nesting dolls". Choli Rad of IGN stated the game was one of the best indie games of the year, highlighting its "fantastical hand-drawn art" and that "it must really be played to be understood". William Huang of Pelican Magazine considered the game to have a greater level of animation and diversity than its predecessors, clearer progression, and more cohesive dialogue, whilst finding the game's text could be "ideological" and its combat remained "quite rusty". Where They Cremate the Roadkill was Clowder's last game, stating an interest to move on and potentially explore other mediums.

== Games ==
Year	Title	Source
2012	Middens	
2015	Gingiva	
2017	Where They Cremate the Roadkill	
