= Nepenthe (video game) =

2018 video game

- Developer: Yitz
- Engine: RPG Maker MV
- Release: May 17, 2018
- Genres: Role-playing, adventure

Nepenthe is a role-playing video game for Microsoft Windows and macOS. It was released on May 17, 2018, on Steam by American indie developer Yitz, and utilizes the RPG Maker MV game engine. The game takes place in the entirely hand drawn-like, strange world of Carithia. The player controls a neutral man who has amnesia and meets some polite creatures.

The game was met with generally favorable reviews.

== Plot ==
=== Setting ===
The game takes place in the kingdom of Carithia, where monsters and other creatures live with humans in harmony and peace (this is a reference to the 2015 video game Undertale).

=== Story ===
The game abruptly begins with the player on an island simply being told, "He'll know what it means". The player character has amnesia and wakes up in the kingdom with simply a note. A character named The Trainer comments on this, stating, "I hate it when that happens!" After some exploring, the player stumbles upon an old lady in a hole. The player can find a rope nearby, and if they find it and give it to the lady, she will thank the player and create a timeline branch. It is at this point when the plot can change based on the player's actions.

==== Ending 1: Bad Ending ====
If the player decides not to help the lady, the other endings are locked. Regardless of what the player does, they will eventually arrive at the Evil Magistrate's castle. After a battle against a guard, the player is now face to face with the old lady from earlier. Regardless of what the player says at this point, a battle with guards will begin. After defeating them, the Magistrate will attack. During this final boss fight, the Magistrate will guilt you for your actions thus far. If the player can defeat the Magistrate, her son, Mograth, will come home, see that she has died, and walk away. The player will then be chased by guards, and once the player reaches the docks, the hand-drawn aesthetic will burn up as the words, "The End" appear on screen.

==== Ending 2: Touched Ending ====
If the player helps the lady, this will launch them onto the path of endings 2 or 3. In ending 2, the player must touch the Nepenthe orb under the town. Arriving at the Magistrate's castle, she will thank the player and Mograth will join their party. The player will explore the game's world until arriving at an island. After a few battles, the player will reach a house.

== Gameplay ==
The battle system is very similar to the 2015 game, Undertale. Combat is turn-based, with an emphasis on dodging enemy attacks.
