= Monster Party =

1989 video game

- Developer: Human Entertainment
- Publisher: Bandai
- Composers: Masaki Hashimoto; T. Mikumo
- Platform: NES
- Release: NA: June 1989
- Genre: Platform
- Mode: Single-player

Monster Party is a platform game for the NES, released in North America in 1989 by Bandai. It was and remains a relatively obscure game for the console, having a small following among some players. The game both pays homage to and parodies horror pop culture, alternately featuring enemies and locations based on classic horror icons, and parodic reinterpretations.

In the 2000s, prototype screenshots of a Japanese Famicom version known as Parody World: Monster Party (パロディワールドモンスターパーティー, Parodi Wārudo Monsutā Pātī) began circulating showing different bosses and parodies. No version of the game was ever released in Japan. In May 2011, a prototype of the canceled Japanese release was listed on Yahoo! Japan auctions, closing at a high price of ¥483000 (approximately US$6,000). In July 2014, the unreleased Japanese Famicom version was leaked online.

== Plot ==
The story centers on a child named Mark (originally known as Hiroshi (ひろし) in the unreleased Japanese prototype) who, on his way home from a baseball game, is approached by a winged, griffin-like alien named Bert (originally known as Value (バリュー) in the unreleased Japanese prototype) who seeks assistance in ridding "evil monsters" from his realm, "Dark World". Being the first person he encounters, Bert tries to enlist Mark as his aid in battle. Mark is reluctant to help, but Bert explains that anyone will do, and that Mark's baseball bat will be as good a weapon as any. Bert quickly whisks him away, and on the way to Dark World magically fuses himself to Mark so that they are one being (with Mark able to transform into Bert for a limited time).

The bizarre premise and plot introduction sets up a game that is filled with variations on many traditional horror characters and themes (sometimes with ironic twists), as well as relatively novel characters all its own. Some traditional horror bosses the game features include a mummy, giant spiders, zombies, Medusa, a Dragon, and The Grim Reaper. The game also features several enemies drawn from Japanese folklore and Japanese urban legends, such as Banchō Sarayashiki's well and Jinmenken (human faced dogs). Enemies unique to the game include a large, talking caterpillar; walking pants; a giant cat that hurls kittens as projectiles; and a bouncing piece of fried shrimp.

After making his way through Dark World and ascending into what appears to be some kind of Heavenly realm, Mark fights and defeats the Dark World Master. His realm now free of monsters, Bert returns Mark home and leaves him with a parting gift for his help. When Mark opens the box, a beautiful princess emerges; after a few seconds, though, she transforms into a hideous monster accompanied by a few monsters who melts Mark's flesh from his bones.

Mark suddenly awakens in his bed, his body intact. Believing his adventures in the Dark World were a dream, he prepares to leave the house to school, only to find Bert standing before the front door with Mark's bat. Bert asks Mark if he is ready to go again, and the game ends.

== Gameplay ==
Mark (as Bert) faces one of the game's unconventional bosses: a giant, hopping fried shrimp. Defeating this form turns the monster into an onion ring, which in turn becomes shish kebab.

The player takes the role of Mark, who wields his bat to attack and to deflect projectiles. Rebounding projectiles back at bosses is often necessary to defeat them as Mark has limited attack options. Enemies drop hearts, which replenish life, as well as pills which (for a small period of time) turn Mark into Bert, who can fly and shoot beams at a limited distance. The effect of Bert's beams on enemies is stronger than Mark's bat attack, and gradually improves as the player completes levels.

Monster Party features eight levels, each of which has a unique password that allows the player to access a particular level without starting the entire game over. The basic objective in each level is to beat particular bosses (and a certain number of them) to earn a key and move on to the next level. Bosses are accessed by doorways found in the main part of the level, which is side-scrolling, but many of these doors lead to empty rooms, adding challenge. Every door, whether it leads to nothing or a level boss, gives the player a question mark ('?') item, which can either provide the player with health, points, or the transformation into Bert.

== Legacy ==
The game's title screen as it appears in the US release. Prototype screenshots revealed that the green "slime" was originally blood.

Monster Party is infamous in the retro gaming community for prototype images released in Japan before the game's release in the US. The images reveal a different original concept for the game that was much darker and more graphically complex than the version eventually released. Originally, the title screen was to be covered in blood, and the enemies designed to look much more horrific than in the final game. The first level's setting, presently an abstract black-and-pink pattern, was originally an elaborately drawn mountain range at sunset. Other changes revealed by these images is a change to the first boss, a large plant, which was shown to have a microphone and speaker in the original, a possible reference to Little Shop of Horrors.

The game is remembered for its bizarre premise by both fans and critics alike. The horror content that was permitted to remain in the game—notably large amounts of blood and the use of the word "hell"—have puzzled gamers, as Nintendo was notorious for enforcing censorship policies in the late 1980s and early 90s, when the game was released.

In the latter 2000s, following the release of prototype images, gamers realized that an invisible platform inside the man eating plant's chamber was in fact the "deleted" speaker system, and that programmers had simply covered the sprite in black pixels rather than outright remove it. This led to the establishment of a restoration project, in which gamers began searching through the game's source code in attempt to discover if other "deleted" content had in fact remained on the cartridge, and reinsert it into a "restored" version of the game. The project was completed in 2013. Amongst discoveries made by those working on the project was the revelation that many of the game's more incongruous bosses may have originated as copyrighted characters that had to be altered for the game to be released in the United States: the pumpkin ghost with the spinning head was originally an ape from Planet of the Apes, while the giant cat inside of the box seems to have originally been one of the Gremlins, and finally the grim reaper was originally a robot resembling a Xenomorph from the Alien franchise.
