= Space Funeral =

2010 video game

- Title screen
- Developer: Stephen "thecatamites" Gillmurphy
- Engine: RPG Maker 2003
- Platform: Microsoft Windows
- Release: September 17, 2010
- Genre: Role-playing
- Mode: Single-player

Space Funeral is a 2010 role-playing video game by Irish developer thecatamites, Stephen Gillmurphy. The short game was created using RPG Maker 2003, and centers around a boy named Phillip, who leaves home to save his world from a mysterious corruption.

Space Funeral is notable for its parodies of the horror and role-playing game genres and its crude art style.

== Gameplay ==
Players control Phillip (and during sections following the game's first major area, Leg Horse) as he departs from his home in Scum Vullage [sic] to search for the City of Forms, a city described as the origin of everything within the game's world. Throughout the game, players repeatedly encounter twisted, and often bloody creatures which take the place of non-playable characters (NPCs) in the game's world.

The game plays like a typical 2D turn-based role-playing game (RPG), although a "Mystery" function that can only be used once per battle has effects unique to each enemy variety the function is utilized on. The effects of "Mystery" are typically humorous, and have little bearing on gameplay: for instance one such interaction causes Phillip to dance and become embarrassed. This ability closely resembles "praying" in Earthbound but with a far greater and more prevalent narrative focus. Certain enemies have absurd weaknesses; such as silent films making some of them sentimental. The game also has quirky status effects, such as "buff" and "sad" along with more typical ones, such as "poisoned."

== Plot ==
Phillip, a perpetually crying pyjama-clad purple boy, visits a wizard in his home of Scum Vullage who tells him that his world has been "corrupted" and it does not have long left. The wizard states that the only hope for survival is to find the City of Forms, a perfect city from which all things in the game's world originates. Phillip departs the village, and soon meets up with Leg Horse, a horse made of severed legs.

During a boat ride to an area called the "Blood Cavern", Phillip notices that certain objects appear as graphical glitches, which the denizens of the world are cognizant of and call "errors", but do not remember what they once were before the "Great Change". The player eventually passes through the cavern, reaching a wizard who demands to drink some of Phillip's blood in exchange for guidance, though allowing the wizard to consume too much blood will lead to a game over. The party are then ambushed by the game's first boss: the Blood Ghoul, before entering the City of Thieves: a city home to a vast array of criminals (who have a strong weakness to bibles).

Once players defeat the King of Crime, they make their way to the City of Forms. On the way to this city, the player stumbles upon Leg Horse's former home, prompting him to reveal to Phillip that he was once "Prince Horace", the ruler of the game's world prior to the "Great Change". It is then explained that Leg Horse's brother has been corrupt as well, and he proceeds to ambush the group in his corrupt form: "20th Century Boy".

The City of Forms is soon thereafter reached, with the area being intensely glitched, and resembling a video game debug room, with the "forms" referring to the game's sprites. The duo discovers Moon, a former artist who sought out the City first in order to be inspired, but realized that it was so perfect that she no longer had any more purpose as an artist, so she decided to corrupt the world to allow her to create again.

Upon defeating Moon, the game is restored to the default appearance of an RPG Maker game, and the characters return to their normal selves, implying that its former appearance was the result of the corruption inflicted upon it by Moon. However, a corrupted house from the original world still remains there, implying that it is not completely gone.

== Development ==
Space Funeral was developed by indie developer thecatamites (real name Stephen Gillmurphy) and took around a month to make. Stephen stated that the game's art style was "based on the weird chunky pixel gore from Monster Party especially the way it could be hard to figure out what a wall of tiled bloody heads was meant to represent in game space." The music selection was stated to have been selected by "pulling together things based on kind of superficially similar tendencies and almost creating a fake tradition in that way which could change how you progress from there." Much of the game was made up on the spot as an excuse for him to use a specific music track.

Space Funeral was inspired by the video games Bat Castle and Monster Party. In a different interview, Murphy claimed to have played Earthbound in his teens but added it was "kinda too late for it to have an impact" at the time of development.

The game's focus on "corruption" versus the "perfect" graphics of the default RPG Maker was used by the developer to decry what he believed was a modern form of classicism for the RPGs of the 1990s, where people believed they were the "peak" of video games and wanted to copy them as much as possible, instead of experimenting and trying new things. He believes that when RPG Maker games break from tradition, they are more interesting.

== Reception ==
Space Funeral received positive critical reviews, citing the game's unusual art style, music, and setting.

Filipe Salgado of Kill Screen rated the game 75/100, saying that its "messiness" went in contrast to the tendency of most games to tie up loose ends. Quintin Smith of Rock, Paper, Shotgun described the game as "Final Fantasy directed by Alejandro Jodorowsky", calling the art "disturbed" and the music "awesome". PC Gamer included it in the list, "The top 50 best free PC games".

Space Funeral gained a cult following over time, partially as a result of attention from YouTubers and streamers. Following the release of Space Funeral, several fan made works were made, two of which, Space Funeral 2 and Space Funeral: The Legend of Earth Birth, impressed developer thecatamites so much he claimed them to be canonical.
