= List of PC games (M) =

The following page is an alphabetical section from the list of PC games.

== M ==
Name	Developer	Publisher	Genre(s)	Operating system(s)	Date released
M.U.D. TV	Realmforge Studios	Kalypso Media	Business simulation	Microsoft Windows	23 February 2010
M.U.G.E.N	ElecByte	ElecByte	Fighting	MS-DOS, Microsoft Windows, Linux, macOS	17 July 1999
M1 Tank Platoon	MPS Labs	MicroProse	Simulation, real-time tactics	Amiga, Atari ST, MS-DOS	1989
M1 Tank Platoon II	MicroProse	MicroProse	Simulation, real-time tactics	Microsoft Windows	28 February 1998
Mad Max	Avalanche Studios	Warner Bros. Interactive Entertainment	Action-adventure, open world	Microsoft Windows	1 September 2015
Madden NFL '96	Tiburon Entertainment; High Score Productions	EA Sports	Sports	DOS	1996
Madden NFL 06	EA Tiburon	EA Sports	Sports	Microsoft Windows	9 August 2005
Madden NFL 07	EA Tiburon	EA Sports	Sports	Microsoft Windows	22 August 2006
Madden NFL 08	EA Tiburon	EA Sports	Sports	Microsoft Windows, OS X	17 August 2007
Madden NFL 19	EA Tiburon	EA Sports	Sports	Microsoft Windows	10 August 2018
Madden NFL 20	EA Tiburon	EA Sports	Sports	Microsoft Windows	2 August 2019
Madden NFL 2000	EA Tiburon	EA Sports	Sports	Microsoft Windows, MacOS	31 August 1999
Madden NFL 2001	EA Tiburon	EA Sports	Sports	Microsoft Windows	23 August 2000
Madden NFL 2002	EA Tiburon	EA Sports	Sports	Microsoft Windows	21 August 2001
Madden NFL 2003	EA Tiburon	EA Sports	Sports	Microsoft Windows	12 August 2002
Madden NFL 2004	EA Tiburon	EA Sports	Sports	Microsoft Windows	11 August 2003
Madden NFL 2005	EA Tiburon	EA Sports	Sports	Microsoft Windows	10 August 2004
Madden NFL 21	EA Tiburon	EA Sports	Sports	Microsoft Windows	28 August 2020
Madden NFL 22	EA Tiburon	EA Sports	Sports	Microsoft Windows	20 August 2021
Madden NFL 23	EA Tiburon	EA Sports	Sports	Microsoft Windows	19 August 2022
Madden NFL 24	EA Tiburon	EA Sports	Sports	Microsoft Windows	18 August 2023
Madden NFL 25	EA Orlando	EA Sports	Sports	Microsoft Windows	16 August 2024
Madden NFL 26	EA Orlando	EA Sports	Sports	Microsoft Windows	14 August 2025
Madden NFL 97	Tiburon Entertainment; High Score Productions; Stormfront Studios; Tiertex Design Studios	EA Sports	Sports	Microsoft Windows, MS-DOS	26 September 1996
Madden NFL 98	Stormfront Studios	EA Sports	Sports	Microsoft Windows	22 October 1997
Madden NFL 99	EA Tiburon	EA Sports	Sports	Microsoft Windows	30 September 1998
Mafia: Definitive Edition	Hangar 13	2K Games	Action-adventure	Microsoft Windows	25 September 2020
Mafia II: Definitive Edition	Hangar 13	2K Games	Action-adventure	Microsoft Windows	19 May 2020
Mafia III: Definitive Edition	Hangar 13	2K Games	Action-adventure	Microsoft Windows	19 May 2020
Mage Arena	jrsjams	jrsjams	Action, Indie	Microsoft Windows	24 July 2025
Magicka	Arrowhead Game Studios	Paradox Interactive	Fantasy, action-adventure	Microsoft Windows	25 January 2011
Maneater	Tripwire Interactive	Tripwire Interactive	Action role-playing, open world	Microsoft Windows	22 May 2020
Marvel Rivals	NetEase Games	NetEase Games	Hero shooter	Microsoft Windows	6 December 2024
Mass Effect	BioWare Corporation	Electronic Arts	RPG, Action, science fiction	Microsoft Windows	20 November 2007
Mass Effect 2	BioWare Corporation	Electronic Arts	RPG, action, science fiction	Microsoft Windows	26 January 2010
Mass Effect 3	BioWare Corporation	Electronic Arts	RPG, action, science fiction	Microsoft Windows	6 March 2012
Max Payne	Remedy Entertainment	Gathering of Developers, Rockstar Games, MacSoft, Feral Interactive	Third-person shooter	Microsoft Windows, macOS	23 July 2001
Max Payne 2: The Fall of Max Payne	Remedy Entertainment	Rockstar Games	Third-person shooter	Microsoft Windows	14 October 2003
Max Payne 3	Rockstar Studios	Rockstar Games	Third-person shooter	Microsoft Windows, mac OS X	29 May 2012
MDK	Shiny Entertainment	PIE, Interplay Entertainment	Third-person shooter	Microsoft Windows, MS-DOS, macOS	21 November 1997
MDK2	BioWare	Interplay Entertainment	Third-person shooter, action-adventure	Microsoft Windows	31 March 2000
Meccha Chameleon	Lemorion_1224; Haganeiro	Lemorion_1224	Casual, friendslop	Microsoft Windows	10 June 2026
Mechwarrior Online	Piranha Games	Piranha Games	Vehicular combat, action	Microsoft Windows	17 September 2013
Medal of Honor	DICE, Danger Close Games	Electronic Arts	First-person shooter	Microsoft Windows	8 October 2010
Medal of Honor: Warfighter	Danger Close Games	Electronic Arts	First-person shooter	Microsoft Windows	23 October 2012
Medieval: Total War	The Creative Assembly	Activision	Turn-based strategy	Microsoft Windows	20 August 2002
Medieval II: Total War	The Creative Assembly	Sega	Turn-based strategy	Microsoft Windows	11 November 2006
MegaRace	Cryo Interactive	The Software Toolworks	Racing video game	MS-DOS	1993
MegaRace 2	Cryo Interactive	Mindscape	Racing video game	MS-DOS, macOS	1996
MegaRace 3	Cryo Interactive	Cryo Interactive, DreamCatcher Interactive	Racing video game	Microsoft Windows	9 January 2002
Metal Gear	Konami	Konami	Action-adventure, stealth	MSX2, MS-DOS	7 July 1987
Metal Gear 2: Solid Snake	Konami	Konami	Action-adventure, stealth	MSX2	20 July 1990
Metal Gear Rising: Revengeance	PlatinumGames	Konami	Action, hack and slash	Microsoft Windows	9 January 2014
Metal Gear Solid	KCEJ, Digital Dialect	Konami, Microsoft Game Studios	Action-adventure, stealth	Microsoft Windows	3 September 1998
Metal Gear Solid 2: Substance	KCEJ, Success	Konami	Action-adventure, stealth	Microsoft Windows	27 March 2003
Metal Gear Solid V: Ground Zeroes	Kojima Productions	Konami	Action-adventure, stealth	Microsoft Windows	1 September 2015
Metal Gear Solid V: The Phantom Pain	Kojima Productions	Konami	Action-adventure, stealth	Microsoft Windows	1 September 2015
Metro 2033	4A Games	Deep Silver, THQ	Post-apocalyptic, FPS	Microsoft Windows, Linux	16 March 2010
Metro Exodus	4A Games	Deep Silver	First-person shooter, survival horror	Microsoft Windows	15 February 2019
Metro: Last Light	4A Games	Spike Chunsoft, Deep Silver	Post-apocalyptic, FPS	Microsoft Windows, Linux, macOS	14 May 2013
Metin 2	Ymir Entertainment	Gameforge, Ymir Entertainment, NCSoft	MMORPG	Microsoft Windows	22 July 2004
Mewgenics	Edmund McMillen; Tyler Glaiel	Edmund McMillen; Tyler Glaiel	Tactical role-playing; Roguelike; Life Simulation	Microsoft Windows	10 February 2026
McPixel	Sos Sosowski	Sos Sosowski	Puzzle, point-and-click	Microsoft Windows, macOS	25 June 2012
McPixel 3	Sos Sosowski	Devolver Digital	Puzzle, point-and-click	Microsoft Windows	14 November 2022
Microsoft Mahjong	Arkadium	Microsoft Studios	Tile-matching	Microsoft Windows	2012
Microsoft Minesweeper	Arkadium	Microsoft Studios	Puzzle	Microsoft Windows	2012
Microsoft Solitaire Collection	Microsoft Casual Games	Xbox Game Studios	Card game	Microsoft Windows	26 October 2012
Microsoft Ultimate Word Games	Microsoft Casual Games	Microsoft Studios	Word game	Microsoft Windows	2 August 2016
Middle-earth: Shadow of Mordor	Monolith	Warner Bros.	Action-adventure	Microsoft Windows, Linux, macOS	30 September 2014
Might & Magic X: Legacy	Limbic Entertainment	Ubisoft	RPG, action RPG	Microsoft Windows	23 January 2014
Might and Magic VI	New World Computing	3DO	RPG, action RPG	Microsoft Windows	30 April 1998
Might and Magic VII	New World Computing	3DO	RPG, action RPG	Microsoft Windows	15 May 1999
A Mind Forever Voyaging	Infocom	Infocom	Interactive fiction	Amiga, Apple II, Atari ST, Commodore 128, MS-DOS, macOS	14 August 1985
Minecraft	Mojang	Mojang	Sandbox	Microsoft Windows, Linux, macOS, Raspberry Pi	18 November 2011
Minecraft Dungeons	Mojang Studios	Xbox Game Studios	Action role-playing, dungeon crawler	Microsoft Windows	26 May 2020
Minecraft Legends	Mojang Studios; Blackbird Interactive	Xbox Game Studios	Action, strategy	Microsoft Windows	18 April 2023
Minecraft: Story Mode	Mojang	Mojang	Graphic adventure	Microsoft Windows, macOS	13 October 2015
Mini Motor Racing EVO	The Binary Mill	The Binary Mill	Racing, Indie	Microsoft Windows	1 May 2013
Mini Motorways	Dinosaur Polo Club	Dinosaur Polo Club	Puzzle, strategy	Microsoft Windows, macOS	20 July 2021
Minit	Jan Willem Nijman; Kitty Calis; Jukio Kallio; Dominik Johann	Devolver Digital	Action-adventure, Indie	Microsoft Windows, macOS, Linux	3 April 2018
Minit Fun Racer	Kitty Calis, Jan Willem Nijman	Devolver Digital	Racing, Indie	Microsoft Windows	31 May 2022
Mirror's Edge	EA Digital Illusions CE	Electronic Arts	First-person action-adventure, platform	Microsoft Windows	12 November 2008
Möbius Front '83	Zachtronics	Zachtronics	Turn-based tactics, strategy	Microsoft Windows, Linux, macOS	5 November 2020
Monaco: What's Yours Is Mine	Pocketwatch Games	Majesco	Action, stealth	Microsoft Windows, Linux, macOS	24 April 2013
Monopoly Tycoon	Deep Red Games	Infogrames	Business simulation	Microsoft Windows	6 November 2001
Monster Hunter Frontier G	Capcom	Capcom	Action role-playing	Microsoft Windows	17 April 2013
Monster Hunter Frontier Online	Capcom	Capcom	Action role-playing	Microsoft Windows	21 June 2007
Monster Hunter Rise	Capcom	Capcom	Action role-playing	Microsoft Windows	20 January 2023
Monster Hunter Stories	Capcom	Capcom	Role-playing	Microsoft Windows	14 June 2024
Monster Hunter Stories 2: Wings of Ruin	Capcom; Marvelous	Capcom	Role-playing	Microsoft Windows	9 July 2021
Monster Hunter Wilds	Capcom	Capcom	Action role-playing	Microsoft Windows	28 February 2025
Monster Hunter: World	Capcom	Capcom	Action role-playing	Microsoft Windows	9 August 2018
Mordhau	Triternion	Triternion	Action, hack and slash, multiplayer	Microsoft Windows	29 April 2019
Mortal Kombat (2011)	NetherRealm Studios, High Voltage Software	Warner Bros. Interactive Entertainment	Fighting	Microsoft Windows	19 April 2011
Mortal Kombat X	NetherRealm Studios, High Voltage Software, QLOC	Warner Bros. Interactive Entertainment	Fighting	Windows	13 April 2015
Mortal Kombat 11	NetherRealm Studios, QLOC	Warner Bros. Interactive Entertainment	Fighting	Windows	23 April 2019
Mount & Blade	TaleWorlds Entertainment	Paradox Interactive	Action RPG	Microsoft Windows	16 September 2008
Mount & Blade: Warband	TaleWorlds Entertainment	Paradox Interactive	Action RPG, strategy	Microsoft Windows, Linux, macOS	30 March 2010
Mount & Blade: With Fire & Sword	TaleWorlds Entertainment	Paradox Interactive	Action RPG, strategy	Microsoft Windows	3 May 2011
MouseCraft	Crunching Koalas	Crunching Koalas	Puzzle	Microsoft Windows, Linux, macOS	9 June 2014
Mr. President!	Game Developer X	Game Developer X	Action, simulation, Indie	Microsoft Windows	10 October 2016
Muck	Dani	Dani	Survival, Roguelike	Microsoft Windows, Linux, macOS	5 June 2021
MultiVersus	Player First Games	Warner Bros. Interactive Entertainment	Platform fighter	Microsoft Windows	28 May 2024
The Murder of Sonic the Hedgehog	Sega Social Team	Sega	Visual novel; point-and-click adventure	Microsoft Windows, macOS	31 March 2023
MVP Baseball 2005	EA Canada	Electronic Arts	Sports	Microsoft Windows	22 February 2005
My Singing Monsters	Big Blue Bubble	Big Blue Bubble	Music, simulation	Microsoft Windows	24 October 2012
My Summer Car	Amistech Games	Amistech Games	Simulation, Indie	Microsoft Windows	24 October 2016
Myst	Cyan	Broderbund	Adventure	Mac OS, Windows	1994
Myth Makers: Super Kart GP	Data Design Interactive	Phoenix Games	Racing video game	Windows	1 January 2006
Myth Makers: Trixie in Toyland	Data Design Interactive	Metro3D Europe	Platformer	Microsoft Windows	19 August 2005
