= Warband =

Warband may refer to:

- A local warrior society
- The ancient and medieval Germanic comitatus
- Mount & Blade: Warband, a standalone expansion for the video game Mount & Blade

== See also ==
- War (band), an American funk/rock/soul/Latin band originally called Eric Burdon and War
