= Mount & Blade II: Bannerlord =

2022 video game

- Developer: TaleWorlds Entertainment
- Publishers: TaleWorlds Entertainment; Prime Matter (Physical)
- Composer: Finn Seliger
- Series: Mount & Blade
- Platforms: Microsoft Windows; PlayStation 4 PlayStation 5 Xbox One; Xbox Series X/S
- Release: October 25, 2022
- Genres: Strategy, action role-playing
- Modes: Single-player, multiplayer

Mount & Blade II: Bannerlord is a strategy action role-playing video game developed and published by TaleWorlds Entertainment and co-published by Prime Matter. It is a prequel to Mount & Blade: Warband, a stand-alone expansion for the 2008 game Mount & Blade. Bannerlord takes place 173 years before its predecessor, with a setting inspired by the Migration Period. Bannerlord was announced in 2012. An early access version of the game was released on March 27, 2020 and quickly became the largest launch of the year on Steam, achieving nearly 250,000 concurrent players on Steam. The game was released for Microsoft Windows, PlayStation 4, PlayStation 5, Xbox One, and Xbox Series X/S on October 25, 2022.

== Gameplay ==
Mount & Blade II: Bannerlord is a strategy action role-playing game. The fundamental gameplay premise is the same as previous entries in the series: the player builds up a party of soldiers and performs quests on an overhead campaign map, with battles being played out on battlefields that allow the player to personally engage in combat alongside their troops. Bannerlord, however, includes significant improvements to numerous elements of gameplay.

Sieges in Bannerlord are intended to be more strategic than they were in Warband. The player may construct a variety of different siege engines and strategically position them before the battle begins in order to target certain sections of the enemy fortifications. On the overhead campaign map, the player can choose to bombard the walls, possibly creating breaches that can be used once the battle begins. To discourage prolonged bombardments on the battle map, only the merlons, gatehouses, and siege engines are destructible during the actual battle. The design of the defending castles and cities is intended to be biased in favor of the defenders; for example, murder holes are often located at key chokepoints, allowing the defenders to slaughter large numbers of the attackers before they can breach the gates.

Bannerlord features numerous improvements to the relationships between characters. The player is able to use a more advanced dialogue system to try to persuade non-player characters to do things that they want. While conversing with a character, the player needs to fill up a progress bar by successfully pushing their arguments with chances to fail critically, fail, succeed, or succeed critically; if the bar is filled, the character will give in to the player. If the character does not give in to charm alone, the player can employ the game's bartering system to exchange items, animals, and, having a certain perk, fiefs; this system is also used for regular transactions between the player and merchants. If the player repeatedly fails to persuade the character, a deal may become impossible and the relationship between them may be negatively affected. The persuasion system can also be used to court and marry characters. While Warband allowed characters to marry, the player may also have children with their spouse in Bannerlord. If the player character dies, one of their children can inherit their soldiers and fiefs and become the new player character.

Bannerlord, like Warband, has a multiplayer component that allows players to engage in combat with each other across a variety of maps and game modes. As in Warband, the multiplayer of Bannerlord is restricted to battles and is separate from the campaign, although the developers have expressed interest in adding multiplayer to the campaign through post-release downloadable content. Bannerlord utilizes a class system that allows players to choose what type of soldier they want to play as. Classes are divided into three categories: infantry, ranged, and cavalry. Each class has positive and negative elements that are influenced by the positive and negative elements of their faction in general. Players select classes using a point system, which replaces the money system of Warband.

== Plot ==
=== Setting ===
Mount & Blade II: Bannerlord is set on the fictional continent of Calradia, 173 years before Mount & Blade: Warband, during the decline of the Calradic Empire and the formation of the predecessors of the factions that appear in Warband. The downfall of the Calradic Empire is analogous to the fall of the Roman Empire during the Migration Period and the formation of the Middle Eastern, North African, and European realms of the Early Middle Ages. The armour, clothes, weapons, and architecture of each faction are inspired by their real-world counterparts from 600 to 1100 A.D.

=== Factions ===
Bannerlord includes eight major factions or kingdoms, each composed of several clans and competing minor factions (which can be hired as mercenaries once the player has their own kingdom) with their own goals. The Calradic Empire, based on Greece, Rome, and Byzantium, once owned a massive amount of Calradia, but has since been weakened by invasions from other peoples and the onset of a three-way civil war. The Northern Calradic faction believes that the senate should choose the emperor, the Southern Calradic faction believes that the widow of the most recent emperor should become the empress, and the Western Calradic faction believes that the military should control the empire, essentially an army with a state. The Calradic factions all use a balance of heavy cavalry (including cataphracts), spearmen, and archers. The Vlandians are a feudal people that specialize in heavy cavalry; they are based on western European medieval kingdoms, particularly the Normans, Vandals, and Goths. The Sturgians, located in the northern forests, specialize in infantry and are primarily inspired by the Vikings and Rus' (Having more similarity to Rus' from the release of War Sails in order to reduce confusion with the newly introduced Nord faction). The Aserai of the southern desert are adept at both cavalry and infantry tactics and are based on the Abbasids and Mamluks. The Khuzaits, a nomadic people who inhabit the eastern steppe and specialize in mounted archery, are based upon the Huns, Pannonian Avars, Göktürks, Kipchaks, Khazars, and Mongols. The Battanians inhabit the central-west woodlands of Calradia and are based on the Celts; they specialize in ambushes, archery, and guerilla warfare.

== Development ==
Bannerlord's graphics were significantly improved from its predecessor, Mount & Blade: Warband, which was released in 2010, with better shading and higher quality and more detailed models. Character animations were created using motion capture technology, and facial animations were updated to improve emotion.

In September 2012, TaleWorlds Entertainment announced that Bannerlord was in development. In March 2016, about 40 minutes of gameplay were shown at the PC Gamer Weekender event. In June 2017, 13 minutes of gameplay were shown at E3. That same year, TaleWorlds began releasing developer diaries on a weekly basis. A new trailer and a playable demo was presented at Gamescom 2018.

On August 20, 2019, TaleWorlds published a trailer announcing plans for the release of an early access version of the game in March 2020. The game released in early access on March 27, 2020. Prime Matter, publisher and division of Plaion, signed an agreement with TaleWorlds to publish Bannerlord especially for physical copies on consoles. Bannerlord was released for Microsoft Windows, PlayStation 4, PlayStation 5, Xbox One, and Xbox Series X/S on October 25, 2022.

== Downloadable content ==
On March 20, 2025, TaleWorlds announced War Sails, a downloadable content (DLC) expansion with a focus on naval warfare, a new Viking-inspired faction, and an expanded map. Initially expected to be released on June 17, 2025, it was delayed to allow for additional time for polishing and technical development. A gameplay trailer was released in late October 2025, confirming a new release date of November 26, 2025.

With the release of War Sails, the base game received a free update, which includes revamped enemy and party AI, new random events, and a reworked system for alliance and trade agreements.

== Reception ==
Reception

Aggregate scores
Aggregator	Score
Metacritic	(PC) 77/100 (PS5) 83/100 (XSXS) 73/100
OpenCritic	68% recommend

Review scores
Publication	Score
GameStar	8/10
IGN	6/10
PC Gamer (US)	80/100
Push Square	8/10

At the time of its early access release, Bannerlord became the largest launch of the year on Steam, achieving more than 170,000 concurrent players. Chris Bratt, writing for Eurogamer, gave the game's early access a largely positive review in an article entitled "Bannerlord is janky as hell, but I absolutely love it". He wrote: "Bannerlord may not be finished and I suspect it won't be finished for a long time to come. It can be repetitive and unfair, many of its systems aren't up to scratch just yet and it's not uncommon to see the game crash or for you to run into some bizarre bug along the way. But at the same time, despite all of that, it is so much bloody fun." Fraser Brown for PC Gamer shared similar sentiments in an article subheaded "It's not finished, it's still janky, but it's brilliant all the same."

In a review for Kotaku, Ethan Gach echoed the incomplete, yet enjoyable gameplay, writing "The action is clunky, the world is ugly ... and since it's an early access game, it's still far from fully fleshed out. And yet after spending several hours with the game I've been thoroughly won over by it." IGN also gave the game a largely positive review. In their article, Leana Hafer stated "for an early access game, it's ambitious and reasonably well-polished, even if it still has a long way to go."

Reviews published after the game's full release generally praised its combat gameplay and visual polish, with Jump Dash Roll's Derek Johnson claiming "everything not only looks good, but sounds super and runs well, too". However, reviewers also criticized the lack of depth of the kingdom and diplomatic gameplay. Jon Bolding from IGN writes "The actual kingdom-management strategy is weak ... Bannerlord's world is busy enough, with caravans of traders, robber bands, parties of warriors, and peasants scurrying about between settlements like ants, but all that really only exists so you have something of your enemy's to raid, pillage, loot, and burn."
