= Mini Metro (video game) =

2015 puzzle strategy video game

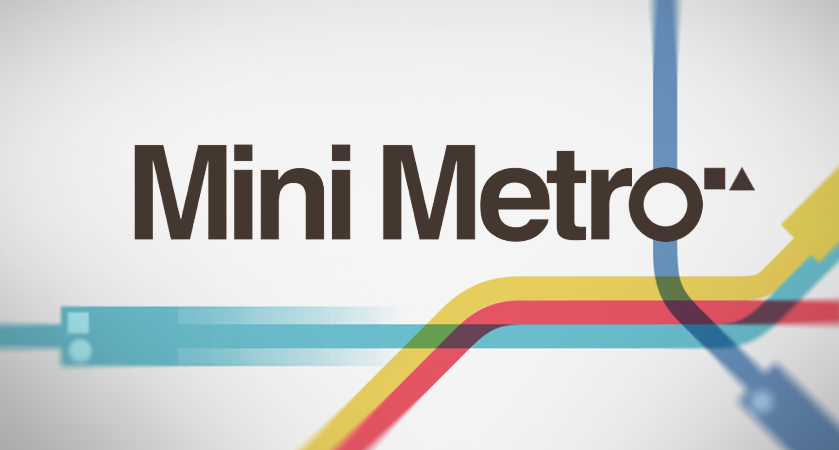
- Developer: Dinosaur Polo Club
- Publishers: Dinosaur Polo Club, Playdigious (Android)
- Designers: Peter Curry; Robert Curry; Jamie Churchman
- Programmers: Peter Curry; Robert Curry
- Artist: Jamie Churchman
- Composer: Disasterpeace
- Engine: Unity
- Platforms: Linux, macOS, Windows, Android, iOS, Nintendo Switch, PlayStation 4
- Release: Windows, OS X, Linux; 6 November 2015; Android, iOS; 18 October 2016; Nintendo Switch; 30 August 2018; PlayStation 4; 20 September 2019
- Genres: Puzzle, strategy
- Modes: Single-player, multiplayer

Mini Metro is a 2015 puzzle strategy video game developed by New Zealand indie development team Dinosaur Polo Club. Players are tasked with constructing an efficient rail transit network for a rapidly growing city. The game's visual style makes use of bold colours and simple geometry to replicate the appearance of modern transit maps. The game uses a procedural audio system to generate sounds based on the player actions and transit network, with inspiration from works of minimal music.

Mini Metro was conceived in April 2013 for a video game development competition, with a prototype version being released freely for web browsers. During the game's conception phase, the developers imposed a set of constraints to limit its scope and ensure the project could reach a finished state. Production of the game continued following the event and an in-development version was released commercially on Linux, OS X, and Windows in August 2014. Mini Metro received its full release on PC platforms in November 2015, on Android and iOS platforms in October 2016, plus Nintendo Switch and PlayStation 4 ports in 2018 and 2019 respectively.

The game had a positive reception, with praise for its intuitive interface, simple gameplay, and minimalist approach. It is widely regarded as one of the best mobile games ever made. A follow-up, Mini Motorways, was released by the studio in 2019.

== Gameplay ==
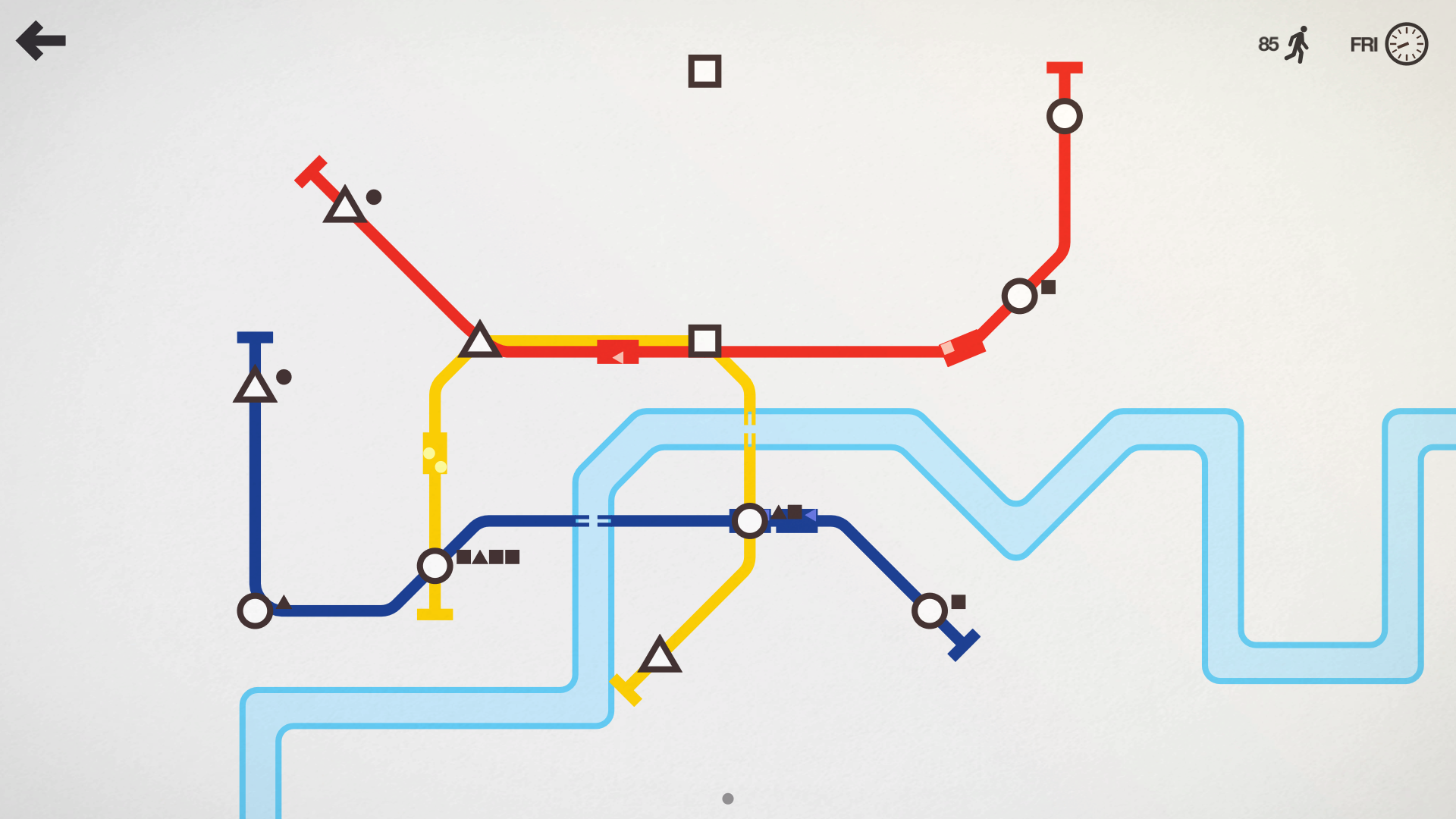
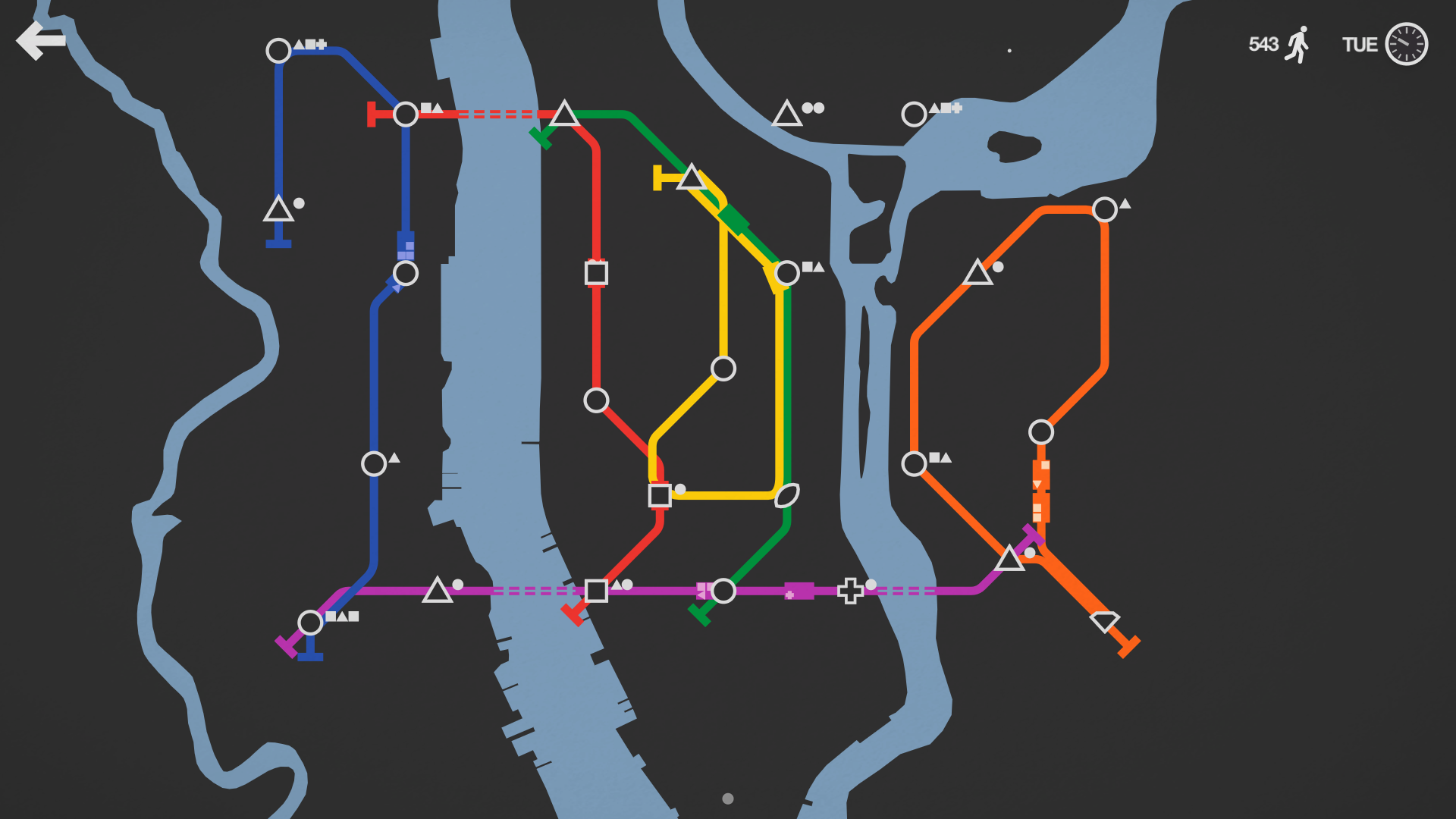
Mini Metro's visual style is similar to that of modern transit maps. Players connect station nodes to create transport routes for passengers.

Mini Metro is a puzzle strategy video game where players are tasked with building an efficient rail transit network for one of several playable cities. The game's visual style and interface was designed to resemble modern transit maps with straight lines and bold colours.

Over the course of the game, stations of various 'shapes' randomly appear on the map, while passengers periodically appear as smaller shapes next to stations, their shape matching the type of station they must be delivered to. The player must connect stations with railway lines and trains, which will automatically travel along lines and load and unload passengers at their desired stations.

Players must continually expand and reconfigure their system under ever-increasing ridership; time may be paused to reroute lines or move trainsets across lines. Water bodies on the map, such as a river, must be crossed with a limited supply of tunnels or bridges. Players are awarded additional rolling stock and assets to expand their system every in-game week, such as tunnels and bridges, new lines, and interchanges, which increase a station's capacity and loading/unloading speed.

Under standard rules, each station can accommodate a limited number of passengers before overcrowding, typically six. As the game progresses, the number of stations and passengers grows. The game ends once a station becomes overcrowded for an extended period of time, although players may choose to continue developing their transit network in the 'endless' game mode.

Four game modes are available:

- Normal: The standard game mode, where the player simply tries to get as much ridership as possible; the game ends if one of the stations becomes overcrowded.
- Extreme: The difficult game mode; while similar to Normal, railway lines and assets cannot be readjusted, relocated or removed once put in place.
- Endless: The relaxed game mode, where stations never overcrowd, and assets are awarded from ridership throughout gameplay rather than over time.
- Creative: The sandbox game mode; added in 2018, players can create, adjust and add stations in the game.

=== Maps ===
As of September 2023, the game features playable maps of 34 cities, with new cities added periodically via game updates.

- London
- Paris
- New York
- Warsaw
- Lisbon
- Tokyo
- Chicago
- Budapest
- Berlin
- Melbourne
- Hong Kong
- Barcelona
- Osaka
- Stockholm
- St. Petersburg
- Boston
- Montreal
- San Francisco
- São Paulo
- Seoul
- Santiago
- Washington D.C.
- Tashkent
- Singapore
- Cairo
- Istanbul
- Shanghai
- Guangzhou
- Nanjing
- Chongqing
- Mumbai
- Addis Ababa
- Lagos
- Auckland

Each map also becomes available for play in the Extreme mode by completing a particular feat in that map, provided that the specified restraint for the feat in question is also met.

London, Paris and New York each have an unlockable alternate map based on their historical iterations in 1960, 1937 and 1972, respectively. All these maps were added on April 25, 2018.

== Development and release ==
Mini Metro was developed by Dinosaur Polo Club, a two-man independent video game development studio based in New Zealand. It is the first game from the studio, which was founded in 2013 by brothers Peter and Robert Curry. They had previously worked at video game developer Sidhe, but left in 2006 to pursue a career in developing indie games. Following a series of abandoned projects, Peter Curry recognised that he would have to restrict the scope of his projects in order to complete them, and with hopes of releasing a finished product, the brothers set a number of constraints while proposing ideas for a prototype game. Minimising the amount of production art was a necessary restriction, as they had little experience in creating art assets. Likewise, they did not want the game's concept to rely on audio content, due to lack of skills in producing music. They also did not want to hand-build each level in the game. Imposing these constraints meant that they could discard most of their potential game ideas immediately, and led to them concentrating on concepts that involved procedurally generated levels and abstract visual styles.

Development of Mini Metro began in April 2013, under the title Mind the Gap. Robert Curry suggested building a mass transit navigation game after visiting London and using its Underground system. The concept was to let the player build a transit system that navigates intelligent agents around, with nodes and lines representing train stations and tracks respectively. It was prototyped over a weekend, and entered in the Ludum Dare 26 video game development competition. They chose to develop the game using the Unity game engine. The Unity Web Player allowed them to release a freely playable web browser version of the prototype during the competition, so more people would have access to play it. Mind the Gap was ranked number 1 in the "Innovation" category and number 7 in the "Overall" category during the competition. Part-time development on the game continued after the event concluded.

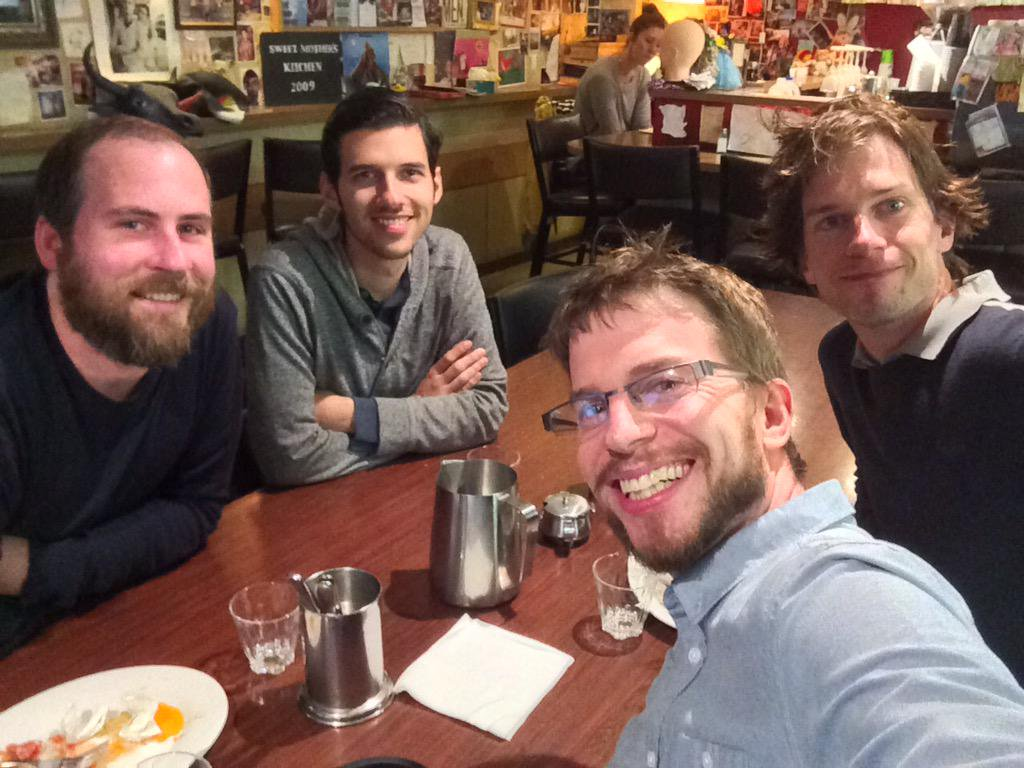
The members of the original Mini Metro development team

In September 2013, the first playable alpha version of Mini Metro was released. They decided to keep the web version of the game freely available, at least until the release of the final game. The developers also submitted Mini Metro on Steam Greenlight, a community voting system that allows games to be released on the digital distribution service Steam. They initially intended on releasing the final version of the game by the end of 2013, however development took far longer than they had expected despite the game's limited scope. A graphical overhaul, issues within the game's balance, and scheduling someone to work on the game's audio contributed to its delay. In August 2014, they decided to release an in-development version of the game commercially through Steam Early Access. They felt that the early access model was suitable for Mini Metro because the game was designed to have replay value and there was no fixed narrative to be spoiled. They continually released new builds of the game based on the community's feedback. The early access release provided them with funds to work full-time on the game. Peter Curry had been working on Mini Metro full-time since March 2014, and his brother Robert started working full-time in November 2014. Originally Mini Metro was being built for mobile platforms, however they shifted their focus to desktop PCs because of the ability to release their game in the early access state.

The brothers hired external help to address two of their initial issues: art and audio. Jamie Churchman, a former colleague at Sidhe, oversaw the visual design for Mini Metro and also contributed to the game design. They approached American composer Disasterpeace to work on the game's audio. He developed a procedural audio system that would generate sounds based on events in the game. Each level in the game has a corresponding set of rhythms and sounds; the harmonic structure of these elements changes based on the size and shape of the player's subways system. The audio was inspired by minimalism and the works of Philip Glass and Steve Reich.

On 6 November 2015, Mini Metro was released out of early access for Linux, OS X, and Windows. Dinosaur Polo Club partnered with Playism and Plug In Digital to release the game on digital storefronts, and Koch Media to distribute the game in retail stores in Europe. A version for Android (published by Playdigious) and for iOS were released on 18 October 2016. The game's release on 30 August 2018 for the Nintendo Switch also added a multiplayer mode exclusive to the platform. A PlayStation 4 port was released on 10 September 2019.

== Reception ==
Reception

Aggregate score
Aggregator	Score
Metacritic	PC: 77/100 iOS: 89/100; NS: 86/100

Review scores
Publication	Score
GamesTM	7/10
Gamezebo	5/5
Pocket Gamer	8/10
TouchArcade	5/5
Kill Screen	83/100

Mini Metro received "generally favourable" reception from critics according to aggregate review website Metacritic. Technology Tell writer Jenni Lada described Mini Metro as "aesthetically pleasing" and found playing the game an oddly relaxing experience, despite the game's attempt to put the player under pressure. Lena LeRay of IndieGames.com also felt that Mini Metro had a relaxing tone and complimented its intuitive interface. LeRay appreciated changes that were made during the early access phase, noting that audio and the Daily Challenge mode were welcome additions, and the interface improvements had diminished her initial complaints about the game. Reviewing the PC version, GamesTM thought that the depth of Mini Metro's gameplay along with the difficulty scaling kept the game interesting. However, they did question why the game hadn't been released for smartphones yet, pointing out that such devices would be suited for the game's simple interface. Kill Screen editor Ethan Gach commended the game for its simplicity and elegance, having combined interactive aesthetics with a robust simulation. Alec Meer of Rock Paper Shotgun praised the game for being a "mesmerising challenge of logic and aesthetics". He particularly enjoyed how beautifully the gameplay descended into chaos as the difficulty gradually increased, calling it "elegant even in disaster". He also thought that Mini Metro was a good example of how to release game in early access. Reviewing the mobile version, Gamezebo writer Rob Rich commended the visual design and intuitive touch controls. He thought that the use of geometric shapes to represent commuters and stations helped simplify the complicated tasks, resulting in an accessible game. Pocket Gamer reviewer Christian Valentin remarked that the game felt confusing early on but became "surprisingly engaging".

At the 2016 Independent Games Festival, Mini Metro won an award for "Excellence in Audio", and was nominated for awards in three other categories: "Excellence in Visual Art", "Excellence in Design", and the "Seumas McNally Grand Prize". Mini Metro also received a nomination for "Debut Game" at the 12th British Academy Games Awards, and received an honourable mention for "Best Debut" at the 16th Annual Game Developers Choice Awards. GameSpot listed Mini Metro in their best five mobile games of 2016. In 2024 Mini Metro was placed on a New Zealand postage stamp, in a series featuring New Zealand video games.

== See also ==
- Mini Motorways — another game from Dinosaur Polo Club
