= Mount & Blade (series) =

Video game series

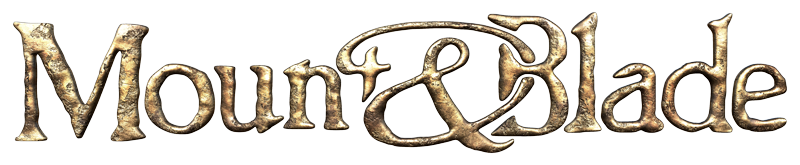
- Developers: TaleWorlds Entertainment; Sich Studio; Flying Squirrel Entertainment; Brytenwalda Studios
- Publisher: TaleWorlds Entertainment
- Platforms: Microsoft Windows, Linux, MacOS, PlayStation 4, PlayStation 5, Xbox One, Xbox Series X/S
- First release: Mount & Blade; September 16, 2008
- Latest release: Mount & Blade II: Bannerlord; October 25, 2022

Mount & Blade is a series of action role-playing video games developed by TaleWorlds Entertainment. The series is primarily set in the fantasy world of Calradia that closely resembles medieval Europe and the Middle East; expansions have taken place during different periods of history. As of 2015, the series has sold over 6 million units.

== History ==
Release timeline
2008	Mount & Blade
2009
2010	Mount & Blade: Warband
2011	Mount & Blade: With Fire & Sword
2012	Mount & Blade: Warband – Napoleonic Wars
2013
2014	Mount & Blade: Warband – Viking Conquest
2015
2016
2017
2018
2019
2020
2021
2022	Mount & Blade II: Bannerlord
2023
2024
2025	Mount & Blade II: Bannerlord – War Sails

The original game, Mount & Blade, was released in 2008. It initially received a mixed critical reception. Reviewers praised the game for its innovative combat mechanics, complex character skill system, and large modding community, but also criticized it for its repetitive quests, dialogues, and locations, as well as low graphics quality.

Mount & Blade: Warband, was released in March 2010. Warband expands on the original game by introducing a sixth faction, increasing political options, adding the ability for the player to start their own faction, and incorporating multiplayer modes. Warband received two expansions developed by different studios in conjunction with TaleWorlds Entertainment. The first expansion for Warband, Napoleonic Wars, was released in April 2012. Developed by Flying Squirrel Entertainment, it was a multiplayer focused expansion that was set during the last years of the Napoleonic Wars. A second expansion for Warband was released in December 2014, Viking Conquest was developed by Brytenwalda Studios and featured singleplayer and multiplayer content based around the Viking Age.

A spin-off stand-alone expansion for Warband, Mount & Blade: With Fire & Sword, was released in May 2011. Developed by Sich Studio with TaleWorlds Entertainment, it was based on the historical novel With Fire and Sword taking place during the Deluge. Unlike the other expansions for Warband it did not require the base game to play.

A sequel, Mount & Blade II: Bannerlord, was released on Steam in early access on March 30, 2020. The game was officially released on October 25, 2022.

== Gameplay ==
The games are action-oriented role-playing game without any fantasy elements, which takes place in a medieval land named Calradia. The game features an open world, in which there is no storyline present. The player is able to join one of the factions, fight as a mercenary, assume the role of an outlaw, or take a neutral side.

== Game engine ==
TaleWorlds have allowed other developers to license the Warband engine, this has resulted in other games that feature the gameplay of the Mount and Blade series. In 2015, Blood and Gold: Caribbean! was released. Developed by Snowbird Games it is set in the Golden Age of Piracy and features both singleplayer and multiplayer content. In 2017, 汉匈决战/Han Xiongnu Wars was released. Developed by Shangshixuan it is set during the Han dynasty. Both games feature the core mechanics and visuals of Mount and Blade: Warband.

== Games ==
- Mount & Blade (2008)
- Mount & Blade: Warband (2010)
  - Mount & Blade: Warband – Napoleonic Wars (2012)
  - Mount & Blade: Warband – Viking Conquest (2014)
- Mount & Blade: With Fire & Sword (2011)
- Mount & Blade II: Bannerlord (2022)
  - Mount & Blade II: Bannerlord – War Sails (2025)
