= TaleWorlds Entertainment =

Turkish video game developer and publisher

- Type: Private
- Industry: Video games
- Founded: 2005; 21 years ago
- Headquarters: Hacettepe Teknokent, Ankara, Turkey
- Key people: Armağan Yavuz (Co-founder); İpek Yavuz (Co-founder)
- Products: Mount & Blade series
- Number of employees: 131 (2020)
- Website: taleworlds.com taleworlds.com.tr

TaleWorlds Entertainment is an independent Turkish video game developer and publisher located in Ankara, Turkey, founded in 2005. TaleWorlds is an official brand of İkisoft Software Company and have been developing PC games under the brand "TaleWorlds Entertainment" since 2005. The company's first game, Mount & Blade, was completed in September 2008, its second game Mount & Blade: Warband was released on March 29, 2010, and its third game, Mount & Blade: With Fire & Sword, was released on May 3, 2011, and most recently the studio has released a prequel to Warband, Mount & Blade II: Bannerlord, on March 30, 2020 as an early access title. Their studio is located in Hacettepe University Technopolis.

== History ==
TaleWorlds Entertainment was founded by Armağan Yavuz, who studied Computer Engineering at Bilkent University. The company formed after members of the gaming community provided support to his hobby project called Mount & Blade, while it was still in its beta stage. The company started to sell e-copies of the beta version of the game online, which funded the development of their first game via online-sales income.

Publishing its first game in 2008, TaleWorlds Entertainment managed to sell over one million copies of the game throughout the world, and reported over three million dollars in revenue. The company developed its second game Mount & Blade: Warband as a sequel.

In 2012, it was announced that TaleWorlds Entertainment was working on a new game for the Mount & Blade series, titled Mount & Blade II: Bannerlord. In 2019, an early access version of the game was announced, which was released on 30 March 2020. The game was officially released on October 25, 2022.

== Games ==
- Mount & Blade (2008)
- Mount & Blade: Warband (2010)
  - Mount & Blade: Warband - Napoleonic Wars developed by Flying Squirrel Entertainment (2012)
  - Mount & Blade: Warband - Viking Conquest developed by Brytenwalda Studios (2014)
- Mount & Blade: With Fire & Sword (2011)
- Mount & Blade II: Bannerlord (2022)
  - Mount & Blade II: Bannerlord - War Sails (2025)
