= Mount & Blade: With Fire & Sword =

- Developers: Snowberry Connection; Sich Studio; TaleWorlds
- Publisher: RU: 1C Company; Paradox Interactive
- Series: Mount & Blade
- Platform: Microsoft Windows
- Release: RU: December 4, 2009; NA: May 3, 2011; AU: May 4, 2011; EU: May 13, 2011
- Genres: Action role-playing, strategy
- Modes: Single-player, multiplayer

Mount & Blade: With Fire & Sword (Turkish: Mount & Blade: Ateş ve Kılıç, Russian: Mount & Blade: Огнем и мечом) is a stand-alone expansion for the action role-playing video game Mount & Blade. The game is developed by Sich Studio and TaleWorlds and was published by Paradox Interactive in Europe. The game and its storyline is loosely based on the novel With Fire and Sword by Henryk Sienkiewicz, depicting Poland's 1648–1651 war against the Khmelnytsky Uprising in present-day Ukraine, and its sequels dealing with the invasion of Poland by Sweden and with Polish wars against the Ottoman Empire.

== Gameplay ==
The gameplay is based on that of Mount & Blade, with similar controls in regards to melee and archery. Like its predecessors, With Fire and Sword is an action role-playing game. This installment allows the player to fight for one of five factions in an effort to control Eastern Europe, however only three have a proper storyline. The game is set in a later, more modern period than earlier titles with access to pistols, grenades, and other equipment of the post-medieval era.

=== Factions ===
The factions are:

- Kingdom of Sweden
- Cossack Hetmanate
- Polish Commonwealth
- Muscovite Tsardom
- Crimean Khanate

== Reception ==
Reception

Aggregate score
| Aggregator | Score |
|---|---|
| Metacritic | 68/100 |

Review scores
| Publication | Score |
|---|---|
| Edge | 6/10 |
| Eurogamer | 6/10 |
| GameSpot | 7.5/10 |
| GameTrailers | 5.8/10 |
| GameZone | 7/10 |
| IGN | 7.5/10 |
| PC Gamer (UK) | 40% |
| PC Gamer (US) | 82% |
| PC PowerPlay | 7/10 |
| 411Mania | 7.5/10 |

With Fire & Sword received "average" reviews according to the review aggregation website Metacritic. GameZone said, "Mount & Blade: With Fire and Sword is the right fit for anyone interested in sweeping historical epics as well as incredibly complex and realistic RPGs. A fantastic entry for fans of the genre." However, many players complained about the aiming mechanics, and some players on Steam complained that Mount & Blade: With Fire and Sword was "more like additional content for classic mode than its own game".
