= Dinosaur Polo Club =

Video game studio in New Zealand

- Type: Private
- Industry: Video Games
- Founded: 2013
- Founder: Peter Curry; Robert Curry
- Headquarters: Wellington, New Zealand
- Products: Mini Motorways; Mini Metro
- Number of employees: 26
- Website: dinopoloclub.com

Dinosaur Polo Club is an independent video game studio operated in New Zealand. It has developed two successful video games: Mini Metro and Mini Motorways. The current CEO is Amie Wolken.

== History ==
Dinosaur Polo Club was founded by two brothers, Peter and Robert Curry, in 2013. They had previously worked at game developer PikPok in 2001 and attempted to create an indie studio in 2006 that eventually failed.

The brothers first conceptualized their popular game Mini Metro during Ludum Dare where the brothers were challenged to make a game revolving around a minimalistic design. They decided to design a game about commuting. They continued to workshop the idea. The studio's first release was in 2014 when Mini Metro debuted in Steam Early Access. Then, it made its official Steam launch in 2015 before making its way to the App Store in 2016. During this time, Jamie Churchman joined the team to work on art and Rich Vreeland handled audio. The brothers continued with programming and design.

In 2019, Apple Inc. approached Dinosaur Polo Club and the two organizations formed a partnership. Apple gave the studio monetary support in exchange for Mini Motorways to launch on Apple Arcade. Once the game saw success and eventually became available on Steam, Dinosaur Polo Club expanded from around eight employees to its current 26. In 2022, they also expanded their office size from 130 square meters to 550 square meters. The old building had two meeting rooms; the new one has seven. The studio hopes to use this new space to grow and create more games. Dinosaur Polo Club is currently working on a simulation PC-based game that is not part of the Mini series. The studio is also prototyping another game that would join the Mini franchise. It continues to update Mini Motorways by adding new locations where users can take control of a city's transportation. Overall, the studio's main aesthetic within its games is keeping a minimalist design.

In July 2024, Dinosaur Polo Club simultaneously announced and cancelled a new project called Magic School. Billed as a "maximalist simulation game," the concept grew in scope until it became clear the company would need a much bigger team to deliver.

== Games ==
- Mini Metro (2015)
- Mini Motorways (2019)
