= McPixel 3 =

2022 video game

- Developer: Sos Sosowski
- Publisher: Devolver Digital
- Platforms: Linux; macOS; Windows; MS-DOS; Nintendo Switch; Xbox One; Xbox Series X/S; PlayStation 4; PlayStation 5; iOS; Android; Haiku
- Release: Linux, Mac, Windows, MS-DOS, Switch, Xbox One, Series X/S; 14 November 2022; PS4, PS5; 16 March 2023; iOS, Android; 29 June 2023
- Genre: Puzzle
- Mode: Single-player

McPixel 3 is a 2022 puzzle video game developed by Mikołaj "Sos Sosowski" Kamiński and produced by Devolver Digital. It is the sequel to the 2012 game McPixel.

== Gameplay ==
Gameplay screenshot.

McPixel 3 is a point and click adventure game centered around the titular pixelated character McPixel, a parody of MacGyver, who is tasked with the objective of "saving the day" by using objects and finding solutions in the environment around them. As in the previous game, puzzle solutions are often absurdist and nonsensical, forcing the player to interact with and combine objects using trial and error to see what happens. McPixel interacts with most objects and people by kicking them, which can be either helpful or a problem depending on the situation.

Similar to its prequel, there are 100 timed levels to complete with over 20 microgames, more than 900 gags, and 1,500 interactive items for players to experience.

== Development and release ==
McPixel 3 was officially announced by Devolver Digital on 17 February 2022.

Although the game is titled as the third installment of the series, it is a direct sequel to 2012's McPixel as there is no second numbered title developed by Sos Sosowski.

A free demo of McPixel 3 was first made available during Steam Next Fest in February 2022.

The game was released on 14 November 2022.
