= McPixel =

2012 video game

- Developer: Sos Sosowski
- Platforms: Windows; Mac OS X Linux iOS; Android
- Release: WW: 25 June 2012
- Genre: Puzzle
- Mode: Single-player

McPixel is an independently produced puzzle video game by Polish developer Mikołaj Kamiński (also known as Sos Sosowski) in 2012.

== Gameplay ==
The game centers around the title character, McPixel, who is a parody of both the television character MacGyver and the Saturday Night Live character MacGruber, which itself was a parody of the former. The game features numerous references to popular culture characters.

McPixel's objective in the game is to defuse bombs or "save the day" in 20 seconds each level. There are four chapters in the game, each with three levels and an unlockable level. Each level contains six sequences. The puzzle solutions are often absurdist and nonsensical, using cartoon-style physics and logic; typical interactions with people and objects involve McPixel kicking them, and directly kicking the bomb often causes it to explode. In one level, to stop a fire from reaching a bomb, the player may have to get McPixel to urinate on it; in another level, McPixel may have to feed a bomb to another person, causing it to explode inside their stomach and protecting the surroundings from destruction.

== Release and reception ==
Reception

Aggregate scores
Aggregator	Score
GameRankings	(PC) 78.67%
Metacritic	(PC) 76/100 (iOS) 83/100

Review score
Publication	Score
Eurogamer	7/10

The game was released on 25 June 2012 for Android and iPhone and as a computer game. As of September 2012, McPixel had sold 3,056 copies. The game was also the first game to be released via Steam Greenlight. From 15–22 August 2013, McPixel was featured alongside four other games in the Humble Bundle Weekly Sale hosted by PewDiePie, which sold over 145,000 units. As of October 2013, a Linux version exists, but is not yet available on Steam. Kamiński has stated on the Steam Forums that this is because the Adobe Air run-time can not be distributed via Steam. To fix this and other issues, Kamiński has stated that he intended to rewrite the game engine to not use Adobe Air. Kamiński announced the rewrite in June 2013, writing that he hoped to be done by September, though no further update was issued.

McPixel received positive reviews, with a critic score of 76/100 on Metacritic for the PC version, and 83/100 critic score for the iOS version. The Verge gave the game a score of 8 out of 10, stating "McPixel is the step further, a parody of a parody. But it's stranger, grosser, funnier and far more blasphemous."

Kamiński credited Let's Play videos as "the largest force driving attention to McPixel", particularly those by Jesse Cox and PewDiePie. After finding his game being made available for download through a Reddit thread, he partnered with The Pirate Bay to promote the distribution of his game through free torrent downloads from the website. This made McPixel the first video game ever to be directly endorsed by the Pirate Bay's "Promo Bay" section.

== Sequel ==
A sequel titled McPixel 3 was announced on 17 February 2022 and released on 14 November 2022.
