= Mount & Blade =

2008 medieval action role-playing game

- Developer: TaleWorlds Entertainment
- Publisher: Paradox Interactive
- Designers: Armağan Yavuz; Steve Negus; Cem Çimenbiçer
- Composer: Jesse Hopkins
- Series: Mount & Blade
- Platform: Windows
- Release: September 16, 2008
- Genre: Action role-playing
- Mode: Single-player

Mount & Blade is a 2008 medieval action role-playing game for Windows, developed by Turkish company TaleWorlds Entertainment, and published by Swedish company Paradox Interactive. In the game, the player controls a customized character to battle, trade, and manage a fief in the medieval land of Calradia. The game was developed by Armağan Yavuz and his wife İpek Yavuz, the founders of TaleWorlds Entertainment. The game was fully released on September 16, 2008, though alpha versions of the game were available prior to the full release.

Mount & Blade initially received a mixed critical reception. Reviewers praised the game for its innovative combat mechanics, complex character skill system, and large modding community, but criticized it for its low graphics quality, as well as its repetitive dialogue and locations. A standalone expansion, Mount & Blade: Warband, was released in March 2010, and a spin-off expansion, Mount & Blade: With Fire & Sword, was released in May 2011. A proper sequel, Mount & Blade II: Bannerlord, was released in early access on March 30, 2020, and was fully released on October 25, 2022.

== Gameplay ==
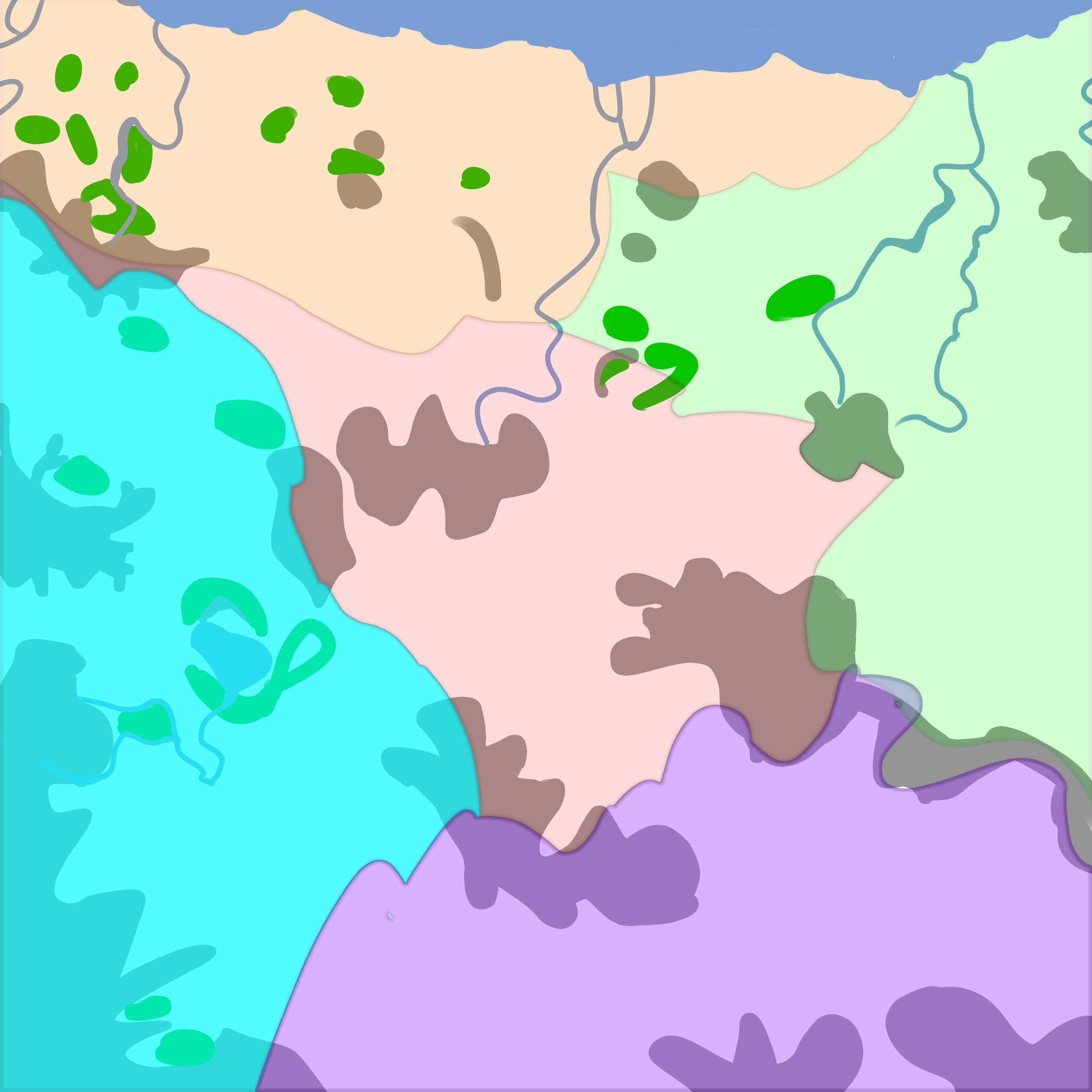
Map of Calradia

Mount & Blade is a single-player, action-oriented role-playing game, which takes place in a medieval land named Calradia. The game features a sandbox gameplay style, and though the player can complete quests, there is no overarching storyline present. The player is able to join one of the five battling factions, fight as a mercenary, assume the role of an outlaw, or remain neutral.

At the start of the game, the player is offered a set of options to customize the character. The player answers a series of multiple-choice questions about the character's past and sex, which generate the character's initial attributes. The player has the option to sculpt their character's facial features.

Traveling to other locations, or interacting with other parties is done by pointing and clicking the desired destination. Upon encountering enemy parties, the player can try to avoid a conflict or can engage in a battle with them. In Mount & Blade each battle is attributed a "renown value", according to the number and power of the members of each party. The player gains the renown points if he or she wins the battle. With a high enough renown, the player may be offered vassalage by the leaders of one of the five factions. By becoming a vassal, the player is given control over a certain fief, which they can manage and collect taxes from. By solving quests or defeating opponents the player is awarded experience points, which can be used to improve attributes, skills, and weapon proficiencies to further develop the character. Weapon proficiencies can be improved over time by inflicting damage on other opponents.

=== Combat ===
An enemy caravan running from the player. The numbers by the party indicate combatants and prisoners, respectively.

There are four main areas where battles take place: on the open map when two or more hostile parties meet, in tournaments organized in town arenas, in siege combat where the player is either defending or attacking a fortification, or in settlements after triggering an event. Events include villages being infested by bandits, the player getting caught in a hostile settlement, the player plundering a village, or villagers rebelling against the player for collecting taxes. The number of soldiers each party can hold is limited by the "leadership" skill and the renown of the leader. Participants in a battle can be either mounted or on foot. The player has to indicate the direction in which he or she wants to swing by moving the mouse accordingly, unless they have changed the options so that the game automatically chooses it for them. Aiming with a ranged weapon is also done by using the mouse.

The amount of damage is dependent on multiple factors including weapon's quality, weapon proficiency, and the speed of the player relative to the target: for example, a javelin thrown while running or riding a horse will be potentially more damaging than a javelin thrown while standing still. Weapons also have certain range of damage where they are most and least effective, giving each weapon type different playing styles. A spear will do minimal damage when used close to the player, while a hammer will cause maximum damage up close.

== Development and release ==
The game was independently developed by Armağan and İpek Yavuz as TaleWorlds Entertainment, the studio they founded together in 2005. The two began making the game in their garage, with Armağan working on code and İpek on graphics. According to Armağan, the game's inspirations include Sid Meier's Pirates!, The Elder Scrolls II: Daggerfall, Frontier: Elite II, and older Koei Tecmo strategy video games such as Genghis Khan, as well as historical fiction novels, particularly those by Bernard Cornwell. Prior to its retail release, alpha versions of the game were published on the developer's website beginning in 2004, and feedback was given to the developers. In January 2008, Paradox Entertainment announced they would publish the game and scheduled to release within the second quarter of that year. The game was released on Microsoft Windows via Steam on September 16, 2008.

== Reception ==
Reception

Aggregate score
Aggregator	Score
Metacritic	72/100

Review scores
Publication	Score
Eurogamer	5/10
GamePro	5/5
GameSpot	6/10
IGN	8/10
PC Format	54%
PC Gamer (UK)	69%
PC Zone	62%

Awards
Publication	Award
GamePro	Editor's Choice
Mod DB	Best Indie Game (Editor's Choice and Player's Choice)
IGN	PC Editors' Favorites of 2008

Mount & Blade received a score of 72 out of 100 based on 28 critic reviews according to the review aggregation website Metacritic. Reviewers acknowledged the game's potential, but also said it suffers from poor production values. GameSpot concluded that the game "feels more underdeveloped than it does flat-out bad", and Eurogamer made a similar review, saying that Mount & Blade has "foundations [...] for something really quite special, but in its current state the game is nowhere close to delivering on its promises". Beyond the combat, little of the game was praised by most reviewers. IGN in contrast, praised the game, stating, "Mount & Blade may be the best game about medieval life ever made". GamePro also gave a positive review and calling it, "the first, great medieval role-playing game". In a review of Mount & Blade in Black Gate, Connor Gormley said its "flaws are negligible, tiny flecks of dirt on the face of one really big diamond, one that dispenses free candy canes, puppies and stops world hunger. It's deep, complex, frequently engaging, intelligent and a calculator could run it."

Mount & Blade has received negative criticism for its repetitive dialogues and locations, as well as its graphics quality. IGN criticized the world map and character models, calling them crude and awkward. However, also praised the combat animation and load times of the game. GameSpot criticized the dialogue in the game, stating that conversations with NPCs feel more like "consulting a travel guidebook for Calradia than actually speaking to a human being", as well as calling much of the landscape "very, very ugly". In addition, GameSpot saw faults in the lack of variety among NPC types and towns, saying that "one medieval architect seems to have designed the entire land." Eurogamer had similar criticisms, stating that the towns and villages all look like copies and the NPCs all share the same line of text.

When reviewing the combat, it received more positive commentary from multiple reviewers. Eurogamer, IGN, and GamePro praised the combat for being physics-based and aim-based, as opposed to many other RPGs. Gamespot stated that it was "the one place where Mount & Blade truly shines," and GamePro called it "far and above the best rendition of medieval warfare yet put onto computer screens." PC Zone, however, criticized the melee combat and claimed that it felt random in its effectiveness on both foot and horseback. But the complexity and thoroughness of the character skill system was well received.

The fan community has received positive attention from both developers and critics. During an interview, TaleWorlds Entertainment stated to be "most proud" of its community, considering that "Mount & Blade has arguably some of the best mods developed for a computer game". Reviewers such as GamePro and Game Industry News also admired the number of mods made available for the beta versions even before the game's official retail release.

== Follow-up and sequels ==
TaleWorlds Entertainment produced a standalone expansion for the game, titled Mount & Blade: Warband, which includes multiplayer support with up to 250 players as well as improved diplomacy, graphics, and artificial intelligence. Warband also has an updated map and a sixth faction. The expansion was set to be released in Q3 2009, but was delayed until March 2010. Closed beta testing began in August 2009, and became open in February 2010, before the expansion's release on March 30, 2010. Paradox Interactive returned the Mount & Blade license to TaleWorlds Entertainment on January 31, 2014.

Paradox released a spin-off titled Mount & Blade: With Fire & Sword, based on the historical novel With Fire and Sword (Polish: Ogniem i Mieczem) by Henryk Sienkiewicz, developed by Snowberry Connection, Sich Studio, and TaleWorlds Entertainment. The game is set in Eastern Europe, and includes the playable factions Poland–Lithuania, Cossack Hetmanate, Russia, Sweden and the Crimean Khanate. The game was released on May 4, 2011. On December 11, 2014, TaleWorlds published a DLC for Mount & Blade: Warband titled Viking Conquest. The DLC is based on the popular community-made mod Brytenwalda, which gained TaleWorlds' attention and was developed as an official expansion of Warband.

A sequel, Mount & Blade II: Bannerlord, entered alpha on March 30, 2020, reaching over 170,000 concurrent players on Steam at its peak. The sequel features better graphics, character creation, battles, dialogue, relationship mechanics, and multiplayer, as well as further exploration into other gameplay paths.

The success of the franchise has spawned many derivatives, including games made with the same engine as Mount & Blade. Such derivatives for example are Blood & Gold: Caribbean, Freeman: Guerilla Warfare, and Sands of Salzaar.
