= Mount & Blade: Warband =

2010 standalone video game expansion pack

- Developer: TaleWorlds Entertainment
- Publishers: Paradox Interactive (PC); Ravenscourt (PlayStation 4, Xbox One)
- Designers: Armağan Yavuz; Steve Negus; Cem Çimenbiçer
- Composer: Jesse Hopkins
- Series: Mount & Blade
- Platforms: Microsoft Windows, Android, macOS, Linux, PlayStation 4, Xbox One
- Release: Microsoft Windows: NA: March 30, 2010; EU: April 2, 2010; Android; March 10, 2014 macOS, Linux; July 10, 2014; PlayStation 4, Xbox One: WW: September 16, 2016; NA: September 27, 2016 (PS4); AU: December 20, 2016 (PS4)
- Genres: Action role-playing, strategy
- Modes: Single-player, multiplayer

Mount & Blade: Warband is the standalone expansion pack to the strategy action role-playing video game Mount & Blade. Announced in January 2009, the game was developed by the Turkish company TaleWorlds Entertainment and was published by Paradox Interactive on March 30, 2010. The game is available as a direct download from the TaleWorlds website, through the Steam digital distribution software, as a DRM-free version from GOG.com, or as a DVD with required online activation. The macOS and Linux versions were released on July 10, 2014, through Steam.

Beyond the original factions of Swadia, Rhodoks, Vaegirs, Khergit Khanate, and the Nords, Warband expands on the original game by introducing a sixth faction (the Sarranid Sultanate), increasing political options, adding the ability for the player to start their own faction, and incorporating multiplayer modes. Reviews of the game were generally favorable, with the addition of multiplayer. The game places a focus on horse-mounted combat and giving orders to one's warband in the field, such as telling archers to hold a position or infantry to use blunt weapons. This game is for ages 12 and up. As of January 31, 2014, Paradox Interactive is no longer the publisher for Warband and has given publishing back to the developer. Warband was released for both the Xbox One and PlayStation 4 in September 2016 for most regions, with an Australian and New Zealand release on December 20, 2016.

== Gameplay ==
Map of Calradia, the setting of the game

As with the first game, Mount & Blade: Warband is a sandbox role-playing game that takes place in the medieval land of Calradia. At the start of the game, the player customizes the character and is spawned into the world. Traveling around the overworld map is done by pointing and clicking on the desired location. If the player encounters other parties, combat may occur, at which point the game switches to real time. If the player wins the battle, their level of renown increases. With enough renown, the player can work for lords, set up their own fiefs, attack towns, and hire more soldiers. The player can also encounter companions across the map to add abilities to their warband. The game is non-linear and has no set objectives, but a common goal is to conquer the entirety of Calradia.

The main changes to the game were the inclusion of multiplayer capability, the introduction of a sixth faction, the Sarranid Sultanate, and the reorganization of the overworld map. The introduction of political options allows players to influence lords and marry ladies, and it is possible for an unaligned player to capture a town or castle and start their own faction. The game contains slightly improved graphics, along with new or altered animations in combat.

=== Multiplayer ===
The new multiplayer mode removes all of the RPG and map elements from the single-player mode, instead focusing on direct combat. Multiplayer matches cater for up to 200 players, split into two teams based on the factions selected. All players are provided with a balanced 'template' character (which can be altered for each server) based on three general types of pre-modern age military: Archery, Cavalry, and Infantry. Characters are customized by purchasing the equipment available to their selected faction, with better equipment purchased after earning denars (the game's currency) in the multiplayer matches. There is no link between a player's multiplayer and single-player characters, and no way to level up the multiplayer character or alter its characteristics from the templates (other than through the purchase of equipment). Eight multiplayer modes were included in the original release of Warband. Most were similar to modes found in first-person shooter games (such as team battles and capture the flag), although other modes, like the castle sieges from the main game, are also included. Some Modifications provide extra game modes. The combat itself varies based on class. Melee combat consists of four directions of attack that are up, down, left, and right, as well as four directions of blocking being the same as attacks. Some melee weapons can only be used in two attack directions, which are up and down, while some cannot block, such as certain knives not obtainable from the equipment menu.

== Downloadable content ==
=== Napoleonic Wars ===
Napoleonic Wars is a multiplayer-focused (some single-player aspects), DLC developed by Flying Squirrel Entertainment for Mount & Blade: Warband, set during the last years of the Napoleonic Wars. It features historical battles from the Napoleonic era of up to 200 players with over 220 unique historical units, controllable artillery pieces, destructible environments and six selectable nations: France, Britain, Prussia, Austria, Russia, and the Rheinbund (the latter added in the 1.2 patch). The DLC was released on April 19, 2012.

The multiplayer revolves around game modes such as team deathmatch, deathmatch, siege, capture the flag, duel, battle, and commander battle. There are also community-organized events that pit player-created "regiments" against one another in first-generation warfare, which attempt to emulate the realistic conditions of Napoleonic warfare. Most of these regiments are based on actual regiments from the Napoleonic Wars. The regiments work together to create organized events, such as line-battles and sieges. Most events are casual, but there are community competitive leagues that hold tournaments between the regiments.

The development team behind Napoleonic Wars was formed from the group that had been making Mount & Musket, a mod for Mount & Blade: Warband. Since the release of the game it has been patched several times, adding more content to the game: sailors and marines as well as usable schooners and longboats, and medics.

Napoleonic Wars received "favorable" reviews according to the review aggregation website Metacritic.

=== Viking Conquest ===
Viking Conquest is a DLC for both single-player and multiplayer. It was developed by TaleWorlds Entertainment and the Brytenwalda team. Viking Conquest takes place during the Middle Ages and allows the player to explore the British Isles, Frisia, and Scandinavia. It features a story mode where the game is based on history and the player's choice affects the outcome, and a sandbox mode which is similar to Mount and Blade's original game in which the player is free to roam around with their own customized character as with the normal version. First gameplay footage from TaleWorlds showed new naval combat where the player will fight on ships and boats. It was released to the public on December 11, 2014, and received "average" reviews according to Metacritic.

A "Reforged Edition", which promised to improve many aspects of the game, was released on July 24, 2015.

== PlayStation 4 and Xbox One port ==
A console port was announced in 2016 for a 16 September 2016 release, to be published in Europe by Ravenscourt. The port was to have no major upgrades on the original, and lack the Viking Conquest and Napoleonic Wars expansions. Modding is not supported in the ported versions. A digital version was released in North America on September 16, 2016.

== Reception ==
Reception

Aggregate score
Aggregator	Score		
Aggregator	PC	PS4	Xbox One
Metacritic	78/100	67/100	59/100

Review scores
Publication	Score		
Publication	PC	PS4	Xbox One
GameSpot	7.5/10	N/A	N/A
GameZone	8/10	N/A	N/A
IGN	8.1/10	N/A	6.8/10
PlayStation Official Magazine – UK	N/A	7/10	N/A
Official Xbox Magazine (UK)	N/A	N/A	7/10
PALGN	8/10	N/A	N/A
PC Format	67%	N/A	N/A
PC Gamer (UK)	83%	N/A	N/A
PC Zone	70%	N/A	N/A
The Digital Fix	N/A	6/10	N/A
Teletext GameCentral	6/10	N/A	N/A

The PC version of Warband received "generally favorable reviews", while the PlayStation 4 and Xbox One versions received "mixed or average reviews", according to Metacritic. Like its predecessor, Warband was praised as a low-cost game with greater replayability and longevity than most contemporary studio-published games. However, several felt that describing Warband as a sequel was overreaching and that the game is better described as a "stand-alone expansion" or an improved version of the original Mount & Blade.

The feature most praised was the inclusion of multiplayer, with ComputerGames.ro describing it as "exactly what its predecessor was missing", while Nick Kolan of IGN stating that the feature is "arguably the main reason for the expansion's existence." Mod DB awarded it the "Editor's Choice: Best Multiplayer Indie Game of 2010" award. Reviewers noted the small number of multiplayer maps and modes, and the imbalance present in several of these, although the ComputerGames.ro review suggested that the producers' acceptive stance towards modding would see these problems rectified. Kolan emphasized the friendlier community attitude compared to other multiplayer games, although Alex Yue of Gamer Limit and Christopher Rick of Gamers Daily News found that there would only be a small number of servers running at any time, and these would not always be fully populated with the possible 64 players. Yue also believed that people who owned the original Mount & Blade and were uninterested in the multiplayer feature would be better not purchasing Warband, as it was the only new addition of worth.

Several reviews found that the graphics, while an improvement over the original, did not compare well with other games. The IGN review claims "it looks like [Warband] was released a decade ago". Brett Todd of GameSpot commented that there were some "picturesque" scenes amongst all the generally "dated visuals", while Rick dismissed the need for high-quality graphics, as he felt the quality of gameplay was more important.

Todd commented negatively on the lack of development for the single-player mode, claiming that although the new faction and political quests were added to the original, the game lacks the depth and background of other role-playing video games, and the open world and steep learning curve may intimidate some players.

In a review of Mount & Blade: Warband in Black Gate, Bob Byrne said "Mount and Blade/Warband offers first person combat and large scale troop management, with different cultures providing troops and environments. That is an appealing stew. Even though there is not a specific quest line and endgame, it's the just about the most enjoyable game I've ever played."
