= Cristina Vee filmography =

Performances by American voice actress

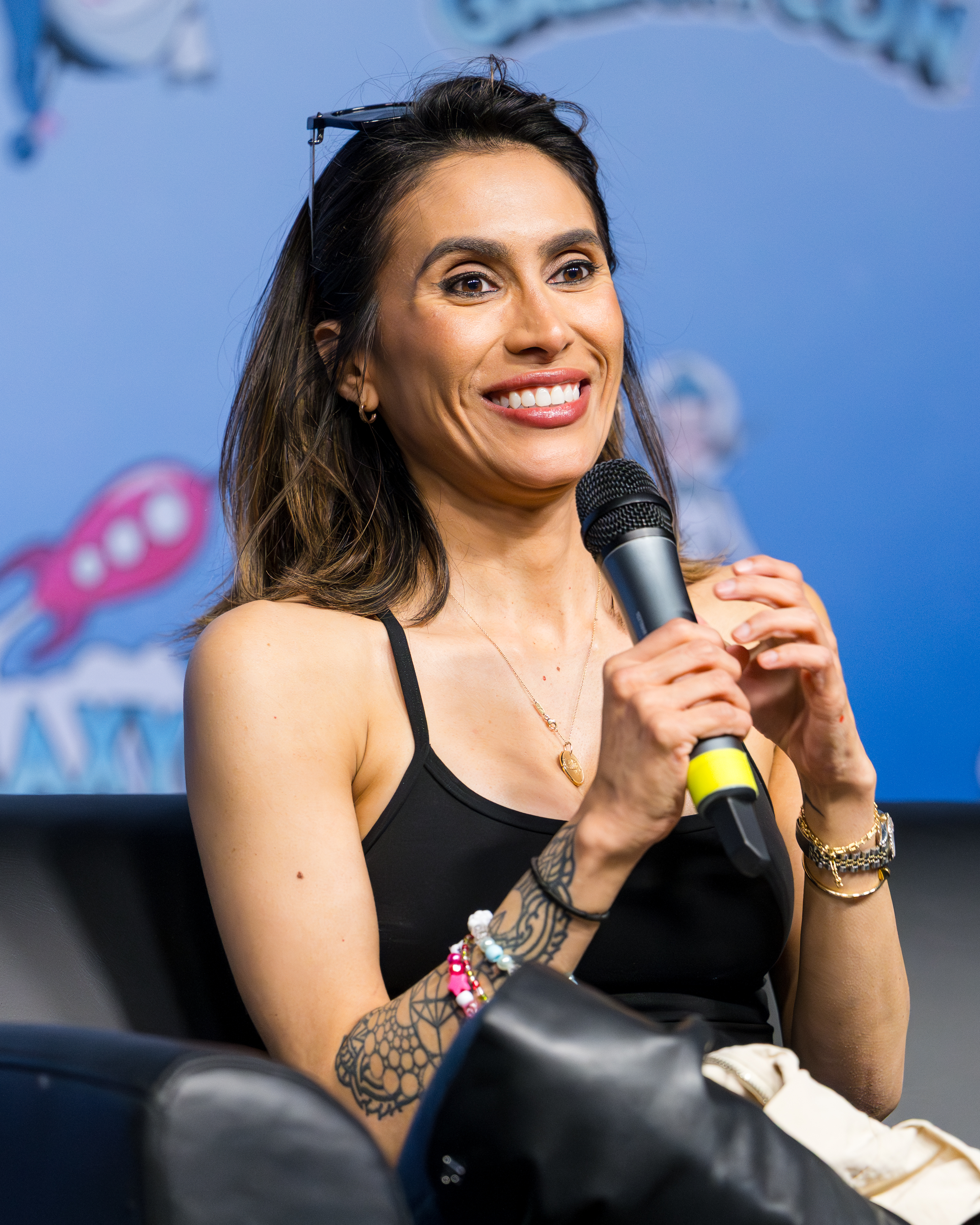
Cristina Vee in 2026

This is the filmography for American voice actress and voice director Cristina Vee.

== Voice acting ==
=== Anime ===
List of voice performances in anime
Year	Title	Role	Notes	Ref(s)
2005	Immortal Grand Prix	Sage Rublev	Uncredited; Ep. "Winner's Circle"	Resume
2006	Haré+Guu	Rachel	As Cristina Valenzuela	
2006	Destiny of the Shrine Maiden	Misaki	As Cristina Valenzuela	
2007–11	Rozen Maiden	Kanaria	Traumend and Ouverture; As Cristina Valenzuela; First major role	
2008	Tweeny Witches	Melissa		
2008	Aika R-16: Virgin Mission	Aika Sumeragi		
2008	The Familiar of Zero	Louise		
2008–09	Magical Girl Lyrical Nanoha	Nanoha Takamachi	Also A's	
2009	Blade of the Immortal	Machi		
2011	Squid Girl	Nagisa Saito	Season 1	
2011–13	K-On!	Mio Akiyama	2 TV series and movie Live-action promotional material	
2012–15	Puella Magi Madoka Magica	Homura Akemi	Also movie	
2013	Nura: Rise of the Yokai Clan – Demon Capital	Princess Yo		
2013	Lagrange: The Flower of Rin-ne	Sachi	No English credits (Note: The title was dubbed in English for streaming, but has not translated the closing credits into English.)	
2013	Accel World	Mana Itosu		
2013	B-Daman CrossFire	Rory		
2013	Pokémon Origins	Nidoran, Cubone	Grouped under "Cast"	
2013	Fate/Zero	Sakura Matou	No English credits	
2013	Ikki Tousen	Red Hood / Female Genpou Saji	Great Guardians, Xtreme Xecutor series	
2014	Magi: The Labyrinth of Magic	Morgiana		
2014	Bleach	Riruka Dokugamine		
2014	Sushi Ninja	The Princess	Web series shorts produced by Genco for Daisuki.net	
2014	Blood Lad	Mamejiro		
2014–15	Knights of Sidonia	Honoka sisters	As Cristina Valenzuela	
2014–15	Doraemon	Mini-Doraemon		
2014–15	Kill la Kill	Rei Hououmaru	Also OVA	
2014–19	Sailor Moon	Rei Hino / Sailor Mars	Viz dub	
2015	Wanna be the Strongest in the World	Moe Fukuoka		
2015	Hyperdimension Neptunia: The Animation	Compa		
2015	BlazBlue Alter Memory	Noel Vermillion, Lambda-11, Nu-13		
2015–16	Durarara!!×2	Ruri Hijiribe		
2015–16	Aldnoah.Zero	Rayet Areash		
2015–16	Fate/stay night: Unlimited Blade Works	Sakura Matou		
2015–17	Sailor Moon Crystal	Rei Hino / Sailor Mars		
2015–21	The Seven Deadly Sins	Hawk		
2016	Love Live!	Kotori Minami		
2016	Your Lie in April	Koharu Seto		
2016	Cyborg 009 VS Devilman	Miki, Sophie	OVA series As Cristina Valenzuela	
2016	Ajin: Demi-Human	Izumi Shimomura	Uncredited (Note: Vee was not credited for her role in the show's English closing credits)	Tweet
2016	One-Punch Man	Mosquito Girl	Ep. "The Lone Cyborg"	
2016	Tales of Zestiria the X	Velvet Crowe	Eps. 5–6	
2016	Danganronpa 3: The End of Hope's Peak High School	Monaca Towa		
2016–17	The Asterisk War	Camilla Pareto		
2016–17	Kuromukuro	Mika Ogino		
2016–18	Mobile Suit Gundam: Iron-Blooded Orphans	Lafter Frankland		
2016–19	Hunter × Hunter	Killua Zoldyck	2011 series	
2017	Little Witch Academia	Marjolaine		
2017	Occultic;Nine	Aria Kurenaino		
2017	ID-0	Karla		
2018	Devilman Crybaby	Miki Makimura	Netflix ONA	
2018	Terraformars	Eva Frost		
2018	Kakegurui	Yuriko	Bang Zoom dub	
2018	Lupin the 3rd Part 5	Ami Enan		
2018	B: the Beginning	Young Yuna, Erika, Kukuri, Takeru	Netflix ONA	
2018–19	Bungo Stray Dogs	Lucy Maud Montgomery		
2018	Children of the Whales	Kicha		
2018	Sword Gai: The Animation	Kiyomi, Young Shin		
2018	Forest of Piano	Takako Maruyama	As Cristina Valenzuela	
2018	Katsugeki/Touken Ranbu	Saniwa		
2018	Saint Seiya: The Lost Canvas	Pandora		
2018	Last Hope	Fiona Sue		
2018	Aokana: Four Rhythm Across the Blue	Rika Ichinose		
2018–20	Hi Score Girl	Chihiro Onizuka, Makoto Ono		
2018–present	Re:Zero − Starting Life in Another World	Elsa Granhiert		
2019–21	The Promised Neverland	Thoma		
2019	Ingress: The Animation	Ai Kizuna		
2019	One Piece: Episode of Sabo	Violet		
2019	Ultramarine Magmell	Emilia	As Cristina Valenzuela	
2019	Cannon Busters	Tiephoyd	Netflix ONA	
2019	Cells at Work!	Staphylococcus Aureus		
2019–24	KonoSuba	Darkness		
2019–20	Isekai Quartet	Darkness		
2020	In/Spectre	Rikka Sakuragawa		
2020	Beastars	Sheila		
2020	Dorohedoro	Ebisu		
2020	Monster Girl Doctor	Saphentite Neikes		
2020	Dragon's Dogma	Olivia	Netflix ONA	
2021	High-Rise Invasion	Yayoi Kusakabe	Netflix ONA	
2021	Vivy: Fluorite Eye's Song	Vivy		
2021	The Faraway Paladin	Robina Goodfellow		
2021	Pokémon Evolutions	Green	YouTube ONA	
2022	Girls' Frontline	Scarecrow		
2022	Komi Can't Communicate	Ren Yamai	Netflix ONA	
2022	Gunbuster	Takami Akai		
2023	Heavenly Delusion	Ran		
2023	Demon Slayer: Kimetsu no Yaiba	Ginko, Urara, Tokito's Mother		
2023	Akuma-kun	Gremory, Yuna Shimamoto		
2023	That Time I Got Reincarnated as a Slime	Violet / Ultima		
2023–present	Jujutsu Kaisen	Satoru Gojo (young), Saori, Remi		
2024	Kimi ni Todoke	Shino		
2024	A Place Further than the Universe	Takako Kobuchizawa		
2024	Go! Go! Loser Ranger!	Fighter XX		
2024	Uzumaki	Azami Kurotani		
2024	Mission: Yozakura Family	Yuki Shirai / Hakuja		
2024	Rascal Does Not Dream of Bunny Girl Senpai	Nodoka Toyohama		
2024–25	Bleach: Thousand-Year Blood War	Riruka Dokugamine	2 episodes	
2025	Blue Box	Karen Moriya		
2025	Witch Watch	Nemu Miyao		
2025	Panty & Stocking with Garterbelt	Stocking	Season 2	
2025	City the Animation	Eri Amakazari / Ecchan		
2025	Medalist	Rioh Sonidori		
2025	Digimon Ghost Game	Kotoha Igashira, Quantumon		
2025–present	Digimon Beatbreak	Reina Sakuya		
2026	Grow Up Show: Sunflower Circus	Ouka Kawasumi		
2026	Jaadugar: A Witch in Mongolia	Sitara		

=== Animation ===
List of voice performances in animation
Year	Title	Role	Notes	Ref(s)
2015–present	Miraculous: Tales of Ladybug & Cat Noir	Marinette Dupain-Cheng / Ladybug		
2017	Steven Universe	Jay-Ten, Little Voice	Episode: "The Zoo"	
2018	Treehouse Detectives	Lucille, Lucille's mom		
2019	YooHoo to the Rescue	Pookee		
2019–22	Victor and Valentino	Xochi, Coyolxauhqui	As Cristina Valenzuela	
2019–present	RWBY	Robyn Hill	Volume 7–8	
2020	ZooPhobia	Kayla (singing voice)	Episode: "Bad Luck Jack"; web series	
2020	DuckTales	Young Donald Duck	Episode: "The First Adventure!"; as Cristina "Vee" Valenzuela	
2020–23	Blaze and the Monster Machines	Various characters	18 episodes	
2021–22	The Casagrandes	Mirta, Customer #2	3 episodes	
2021–present	Helluva Boss	Verosika Mayday	Web series; as Cristina "Vee" Valenzuela	
2021–present	Chikn Nuggit	Fwench Fwy	Web series	
2023–present	The Loud House	Ann, Nina, Various	2 episodes	
2023–present	Adventure Time: Fionna and Cake	Ice Scout #2, Skater Fairies, Various	3 episodes	
2024	Hailey's On It!	Blabby Abby	2 episodes	
2024–25	Primos	Tere, Toñita background girl in 21B	Main role; as Cristina "Vee" Valenzuela	
2025	Chibiverse	Tere, Toñita background girl in 21B	1 episode	
2025	Gabriel and the Guardians	Namay'ah	Angel Studios	

=== Film ===
List of voice performances in feature films
Year	Title	Role	Notes	Ref(s)
2011	Tekken: Blood Vengeance	Alisa Bosconovitch	Limited theatrical release	
2016–18	Digimon Adventure tri.	Meiko Mochizuki	Limited theatrical release, six movies	
2017	Sailor Moon R: The Movie	Sailor Mars	Viz dub Limited theatrical release	
2017	Resident Evil: Vendetta	Maria Gomez	Limited theatrical release	
2017	Fairy Tail: Dragon Cry	Swan	Funimation dub Limited theatrical release	
2018	Fate/stay night: Heaven's Feel I. presage flower	Sakura Matou	Aniplex of America; Theatrical release	
2018	Sailor Moon S: The Movie	Rei Hino/Sailor Mars	Limited theatrical release, Viz dub	
2018	Sailor Moon SuperS: The Movie	Rei Hino/Super Sailor Mars	Limited theatrical release, Viz dub	
2018	Liz and the Blue Bird	Reina Kousaka	Limited theatrical release	
2021	Sailor Moon Eternal	Rei Hino/Super Sailor Mars	Netflix dub	
2021	My Hero Academia: World Heroes' Mission	Pino Young Rody Soul	Limited theatrical release	
2022	Belle	Peggie Sue	Limited theatrical release	
2023	Resident Evil: Death Island	Maria Gomez	Limited theatrical release	
2024	Rascal Does Not Dream of a Knapsack Kid	Nodoka Toyohama	Aniplex of America; Theatrical release	
2024	Mobile Suit Gundam: Silver Phantom	Haro	Bandai Namco Filmworks VR movie	
2025	Anpanman: Apple Boy and Everyone's Hope	Dokeen	Netflix dub	

List of voice performances in direct-to-video and television films
Year	Title	Role	Notes	Ref(s)
2008	One Missed Call	Ritsuko, Mimiko	Live-action dub	
2012	Little Big Panda	Yung Fu		
2014	Lalaloopsy Girls: Welcome to L.A.L.A Prep School	Spot Splatter Splash		
2014–16	Lego Friends films	Tanya		
2015	Tiger and Bunny: The Rising	Kasha Graham		
2015	Lupin III: Jigen's Gravestone	Fujiko Mine		
2016	Love Live! The School Idol Movie	Kotori Minami		
2016	Strike Witches: The Movie	Shizuka Hattori	As Cristina Valenzuela	
2017	Sword Art Online: Ordinal Scale	Alicia Lu		
2017	Blame!	Cibo		
2018	Godzilla: Planet of the Monsters	Yuko Tani	Netflix release Uncredited (Note: Vee was not credited for her role in the film's English closing credits)	Tweet
2018	Godzilla: City on the Edge of Battle	Yuko Tani	Netflix	
2019	Godzilla: The Planet Eater	Yuko Tani	Netflix	
2021	Case Closed: The Fist of Blue Sapphire	Ran Mori		
2022	Bubble	Undertaker Leader	Netflix release	
2022	Case Closed: The Scarlet Bullet	Ran Mori	Netflix	
2023	Lupin the 3rd vs. Cat's Eye	Rui Kisugi	Amazon Prime Video	
2023	Ladybug & Cat Noir: The Movie	Ladybug / Marinette Dupain-Cheng	Netflix	

=== Video games ===
List of voice performances in video games
Year	Title	Role	Notes	Ref(s)
2009	Rune Factory Frontier	Cinnamon	Uncredited (Note: The title did not list any English voice actors in its closing credits.)	
2009	Final Fantasy Crystal Chronicles: The Crystal Bearers	Various characters		
2009–15	BlazBlue series	Noel Vermillion, Nu-13, Lambda-11, Mu-12		
2011	Where in the World is Carmen Sandiego?	Carmen Sandiego	Official Facebook App	
2011	Dynasty Warriors series	Lian Shi	Starting with Dynasty Warriors 7 until Dynasty Warriors 8 (including Xtreme Legends)	
2011	League of Legends	Riven the Exile		
2011–12	MapleStory	Mercedes (female), Aria (anime cutscenes), Luminous (female)		
2011–present	Hyperdimension Neptunia series	Compa, Croire		
2012	Planetside 2	Terran Republic Soldier		
2012	Skullgirls	Cerebella	Also casting and voice director	
2012	Loren The Amazon Princess		Theme song performance: "Until I'm Broken"	
2013	Armored Core: Verdict Day	K. Helicopter Reinforcement, 30's Female Pilot		
2014	Demon Gaze			
2014	Drakengard 3	Four		
2014	Ar Nosurge	Ion	Uncredited	
2014	Shantae and the Pirate's Curse	Shantae, Risky Boots		
2015	Final Fantasy Type-0 HD	Cinque		
2015	Til Morning's Light	Brooke	Also casting and voice director	
2015	Veecaloid Pop	Milky	iOS	
2015	Runbow	Shantae		
2015	Stella Glow	Nonoka		
2015	Xenoblade Chronicles X	Avatar (Female Avatar (Peppy))	As Cristina Valenzuela	
2015	Elsword	Rena Erindel	Also trailer for "Corgi Mount"	
2015	Danganronpa Another Episode: Ultra Despair Girls	Monaca		
2016	Cat Girl Without Salad: Amuse-Bouche	Kebako, Squiddie, Cat Grill	Credited as Voice Actors. Also voice director and producer	
2016	Shantae: Half-Genie Hero	Shantae, Risky Boots	Theme song performance ("Dance Through the Danger"); Credited under "Characters voiced by"	
2016; 2021	Street Fighter V	Enero, Ibuki (Note: Shared role with Kat Steel.)	A Shadow Falls DLC	
2017	Tales of Berseria	Velvet Crowe		
2017	Fire Emblem Heroes	Lachesis, Athena, Tatiana, Nerþuz, Merrin	As Cristina "Vee" Valenzuela	
2017	Akiba's Beat	Akari Hozuki, Aoi Hozuki		
2017	Friday the 13th: The Game	Deborah Kim		
2018	Detective Pikachu	Nina O'Hara, others		
2018	Paladins	Ying		
2018	BlazBlue: Cross Tag Battle	Noel Vermillion, Nu-13	Crossover ft. BlazBlue characters	
2018	Sushi Striker: The Way of Sushido	Musashi (Female)		
2018	Octopath Traveler	Ophilia Clement		
2018	Food Fantasy	Ume Ochazuke		
2018	Just Cause 4	People of Solis		
2019	Ace Combat 7: Skies Unknown	Ionela A. Shilage		
2019	Crackdown 3	Dr. Katala Vargas		
2019	Chocobo's Mystery Dungeon Every Buddy!	Mog		
2019	Zanki Zero	Yuma Mashiro		
2019	Rage 2	Dreadwood Civilian, Vineland Civilian, Shrouded Bolter		
2019	Judgement	Mari		
2019	River City Girls	Kazumi Hasebe, Kaori	Also voice director and theme song performer	
2019	Shantae and the Seven Sirens	Shantae, Risky Boots, Harmony	Also theme song performer	
2019	Indivisible	Tzitzi	Also voice director and producer	
2019	Concrete Genie	Creatures		
2019	Conception Plus: Maidens of the Twelve Stars	Ruka		
2020	Vitamin Connection	Tour Guide, Vibrio	Also VO Casting and direction	
2020	One-Punch Man: A Hero Nobody Knows	Mosquito Girl		
2020	Granblue Fantasy Versus	Charlotta, Ferry		
2020	Fallout 76: Wastelanders	Isela Mejia, Mercedes Stern, Raider (Female)		
2020	Guardian Tales	Marina, Arabelle, Scarlet (Mad Panda Trio)		
2020	Marvel's Avengers	AIM Product, AIM Security Female, AIM Business		
2020	13 Sentinels: Aegis Rim	Megumi Yakushiji		
2020	Onee Chanbara ORIGIN	Saki		
2020	The Legend of Heroes: Trails of Cold Steel IV	Klaudia von Auslese, Cecile Neues		
2020	Bugsnax	Cheezer		
2020	Genshin Impact	Bennett, Xingqiu		
2020	Hyrule Warriors: Age of Calamity	Hestu, Tulin		
2020	Cyberpunk 2077	Additional voices		
2021	Re:Zero − Starting Life in Another World: The Prophecy of the Throne	Elsa Granhiert		
2021	Akiba's Trip: Hellbound & Debriefed	Sena Kitada		
2021	The Addams Family: Mansion Mayhem	Wednesday, Committee Person		
2021	Lost Judgment	Mari	As Cristina Vee Valenzuela	
2021	Tales of Luminaria	Celia Arvier		
2021	Cookie Run: Kingdom	Frost Queen Cookie		
2022	Dawn of the Monsters	Sofia Cruces	Also casting and voice director	
2022	Triangle Strategy	Ezana Klinka, Lyla Viscraft		
2022	Chocobo GP	Racing Hero X		
2022	Relayer	Dark Lord, additional voices		
2022	Phantom Breaker: Omnia	Waka Kumon		
2022	Rune Factory 5	Fuuka		
2022	Evil Dead: The Game	Deadite Berserker, Meat Puppet, Demi-Eligos		
2022	Star Ocean: The Divine Force	Chloe Kanaris		
2022	Call of Duty: Modern Warfare II	Battle Buddy Aloof		
2022	River City Girls 2	Kazumi Hasebe, Kaori, Kebako, Roxy Hasebe, Yoko, Saori Gōda, miscellaneous enemies	Also voice director and theme song performer	
2022	Path to Nowhere	Hella, K.K.		
2023	Fire Emblem Engage	Merrin		
2023	Octopath Traveler II	Mahina		
2023	Advance Wars 1+2: Re-Boot Camp	Nell	Also casting and voice director	
2023	The Legend of Zelda: Tears of the Kingdom	Tulin	Reprised role from Hyrule Warriors: Age of Calamity	
2023	Omega Strikers	Octavia		
2023	Loop8: Summer of Gods	Ichika, additional voices		
2023	The Legend of Heroes: Trails into Reverie	Cecile Neues, Soldiers & Citizens of Zemuria		
2023	Arknights	Skadi		
2023	Rhapsody II: Ballad of the Little Princess	Cello		
2023	Rhapsody III: Memories of Marl Kingdom	Cello		
2023	Mortal Kombat 1	Nitara (Note: Shared role with Megan Fox.)	In-game battle grunts only.	
2023	Granblue Fantasy Versus Rising	Charlotta, Ferry		
2024	Granblue Fantasy: Relink	Charlotta, Ferry		
2024	Unicorn Overlord	Rosalinde		
2024	The Legend of Heroes: Trails Through Daybreak	Saara, Shaheena		
2024	Romancing SaGa 2: Revenge of the Seven	Cat/Vagabond (F)		
2024	Zenless Zone Zero	Hoshimi Miyabi		
2024	Yars Rising	Mrs. Davidson		
2024	Card-en-Ciel	Ancie		
2024	Mighty Morphin Power Rangers: Rita's Rewind	Pink Ranger/Kimberly Ann Hart		
2025	The Legend of Heroes: Trails Through Daybreak II	Saara, Shaheena, citizens		
2025	Xenoblade Chronicles X	Avatar (Female Avatar (Peppy)), additional voices		
2025	Rune Factory: Guardians of Azuma	Sunny, Umi		
2025	Yakuza 0 Director's Cut	Additional voices		
2025	Date Everything!	Miranda		
2025	Daemon X Machina: Titanic Scion	Nova (Female)		
2025	Towa and the Guardians of the Sacred Tree	Kanro, Keisetsu, Sarubobo, Female 1		
2025	Trails in the Sky 1st Chapter	Kloe Rinz		
2025	Digimon Story: Time Stranger	Aegiomon, additional voices		
2025	Honkai: Star Rail	The Dahlia	Replaced Jennifer Losi	
2025	Octopath Traveler 0	Ophilia Clement		
2026	Neverness to Everness	Akane Rin	Here since 1.0 with the spin-off quest : "A Legendary(?) Band’s First Page". Official Release : 21 October 2026	
2026	Monster Hunter Stories 3: Twisted Reflection	Rudy		
2026	Trails in the Sky 2nd Chapter	Kloe Rinz		
2026	Final Fantasy Resonance	Aileen		
2026	The Legend of Zelda: Ocarina of Time	Nabooru		
2026	Grand Theft Auto VI	The Local Population		

=== Dubbing of foreign shows in English ===
Dubbing of foreign shows in English
Year	Title	Role	Notes	Ref(s)
2013–17	Violetta	Violetta "Vilu" Castillo	As Cristina Valenzuela	
2016	Marseille	Julia Taro		

=== Other dubbing ===
List of voice performances in other projects
Title	Role	Notes	Ref(s)
Kizumonogatari	Kissshot, Tsubasa Hanekawa	Audiobook	
Nekomonogatari: White		Audiobook	
Theme Song Takeover	Tere, Toñita	Webseries	

=== Podcast ===
Year	Title	Role	Notes
2023	Who is No/One	Reporter #3	

== Live-action ==
=== Television ===
List of appearances in television and web series
Date	Title	Role	Notes	Ref(s)
2010	The Adventures of the ASOS Brigade	Haruhi Suzumiya	Season 2 Live-action series to support the anime TV series	
2010	Anime TV	Various; Host	Season 1 Seasons 2–3	
2017	Power Rangers Hyperforce	Vesper / Hyperforce Black Ranger	RPG web series Cast member	

=== Film ===
List of appearances in film
Date	Title	Role	Notes	Ref(s)
2016	Altered Spirits (Broken Spirits)	Valerie		

=== Other ===
List of appearances in other media
Date	Title	Role	Notes	Ref(s)
2012	IGN Pro League 4: League of Legends tournament	Host		
2012	IGN Pro League 5: League of Legends tournament	Host		
2012	Crunchyroll demos and promotions	Host		
2018	RichaadEB - Bad Apple!! Metal Cover	Vocalist		
2023	Sam Haft - Grow Up feat. CG5	Hacker		
