= Shantae Advance: Risky Revolution =

2025 video game

Shantae Advance: Risky Revolution!
- Game Boy Advance cover art
- Developer: WayForward
- Publisher: WayForward (Note: Physical releases were distributed by Limited Run Games)
- Director: Matt Bozon
- Producers: Matt Bozon; Erin Bozon
- Designer: Matt Bozon
- Programmers: Michael Stragey; Jimmy Huey
- Artists: Matt Bozon; Shaun Healey
- Writer: Matt Bozon
- Composer: Maddie Lim
- Series: Shantae
- Platforms: Game Boy Advance; Nintendo Switch; PlayStation 4; PlayStation 5; Windows; Xbox One; Xbox Series X/S
- Release: Game Boy Advance; April 21, 2025; Nintendo Switch, PlayStation 4, PlayStation 5, Windows, Xbox One, Xbox Series X/S; August 19, 2025
- Genres: Platform, Metroidvania
- Modes: Single-player, multiplayer

Shantae Advance: Risky Revolution (stylized as Shantae Advance: "Risky Revolution!") is a 2025 platform game by WayForward. It is the sixth game in the Shantae series, chronologically taking place between the original Shantae (2002) and Shantae: Risky's Revenge (2010). The game follows the half-genie Shantae as she explores the world of Sequin Land and attempts to prevent her nemesis Risky Boots from using a subterranean device to terraform the world.

The game began development for the Game Boy Advance (GBA) in 2002, and was planned as the second game in the series, but was cancelled in 2004 due to WayForward being unable to find a publisher for it. In 2023, WayForward announced that development had resumed, and that Limited Run Games would be distributing physical cartridges for the game. The GBA version was released in April 2025, with ports of the game for Nintendo Switch, PlayStation 4, PlayStation 5, Windows, Xbox One and Xbox Series X/S released digitally the following August.

== Gameplay ==
Shantae Advance is a platform-adventure game, in which players control the eponymous Shantae, a half-genie who must travel across the continent of Sequin Land in order to stop the evil lady pirate Risky Boots. Shantae's default attack involves using her hair like a whip, and she can learn special dances that grant her the ability to transform into different creatures. In addition to the returning monkey, elephant, spider and harpy transformations from the original Shantae, new transformations include a mermaid and a crab.

Several areas in the game feature gameplay elements in both the foreground and background, which Shantae can move between using specific gates. By pressing Tremor Engine switches placed in an environment, Shantae can rotate and reposition the background terrain, allowing her to reach otherwise inaccessible areas. Shantae can also travel between different regions by flying on the back of Sky's bird Hatchet. The game features a multiplayer battle mode for up to four players using a single Game Boy Advance cartridge.

The console and PC versions of the game include the ability to toggle between the original and a "Modern" mode with updated high-resolution character portraits, UI elements, and cinematic images, as well as additional arenas for the battle mode, which can be played locally on a single screen. A deluxe edition is available for these versions that adds three selectable costumes for Shantae, each of which increases the strength of one of her spells. The deluxe edition content is included in the ports' physical releases.

== Plot ==
Shortly after her first defeat of Risky Boots, (Note: As depicted in Shantae (2002)) Shantae assists her friends with constructing new anti-pirate defenses for Scuttle Town. As Shantae is introducing Sky and Bolo to new friend Rottytops, Risky arrives, announcing she has a new plan to rule Sequin Land. Shantae pursues and battles Risky before falling into a chasm leading to a massive subterranean cavern spanning all of Sequin Land. There, she and her friends learn that Risky plans to use a device called the Tremor Engine to rotate the King's Pillar, a massive stone column supporting the whole continent, rearranging the surface above and exposing landlocked areas to the coast so her pirate crew can pillage them. Risky demonstrates by forcing Scuttle Town inland, turning it into a desert.

Shantae's uncle Mimic suggests she find three of his fellow members of the Relic Hunter's Guild, believing the four of them will be able to come up with a solution. Learning of this, Risky frees the Muck Lords, three demons who were imprisoned by her former captain, in exchange for the Relic Hunters' capture. Shantae travels to several different towns that have been displaced, each time using the Tremor Engine's activation switches to move them back where they belong. As she defeats the Muck Lords and retrieves the Relic Hunters, she learns that each time Risky uses the Tremor Engine, it weakens the King's Pillar; should it crumble, the entire surface will collapse into the magma below.

Once all the Relic Hunters have been rescued, they propose triggering an earthquake beneath the King's Pillar to make the magma rise, filling the cavern and creating a new foundation under Sequin Land when it cools. Shantae and the Relic Hunters construct a miniature version of the Tremor Engine and return to the King's Pillar to activate it. As the Relic Hunters escape, Risky appears and briefly battles Shantae before revealing that she has been using the Tremor Engine to steal components for the Tinkerworm, a massive drilling machine, intent on attacking towns from below. Shantae destroys the Tinkerworm, and the Muck Lords decide to abandon Risky. As the magma begins erupting, Risky flees pursued by Shantae, who destroys her airship. Shantae is rescued by her friends, and they watch as the magma cools before breaching the surface. The Sultana of Sequin Land thanks Shantae for her heroics, and grants her request to hold a new Relic Hunter Expo. (Note: As depicted in Shantae: Risky's Revenge (2010)) Shantae then reunites with her friends to help them babysit Bolo's baby brother, while Risky swears revenge.

== Development ==
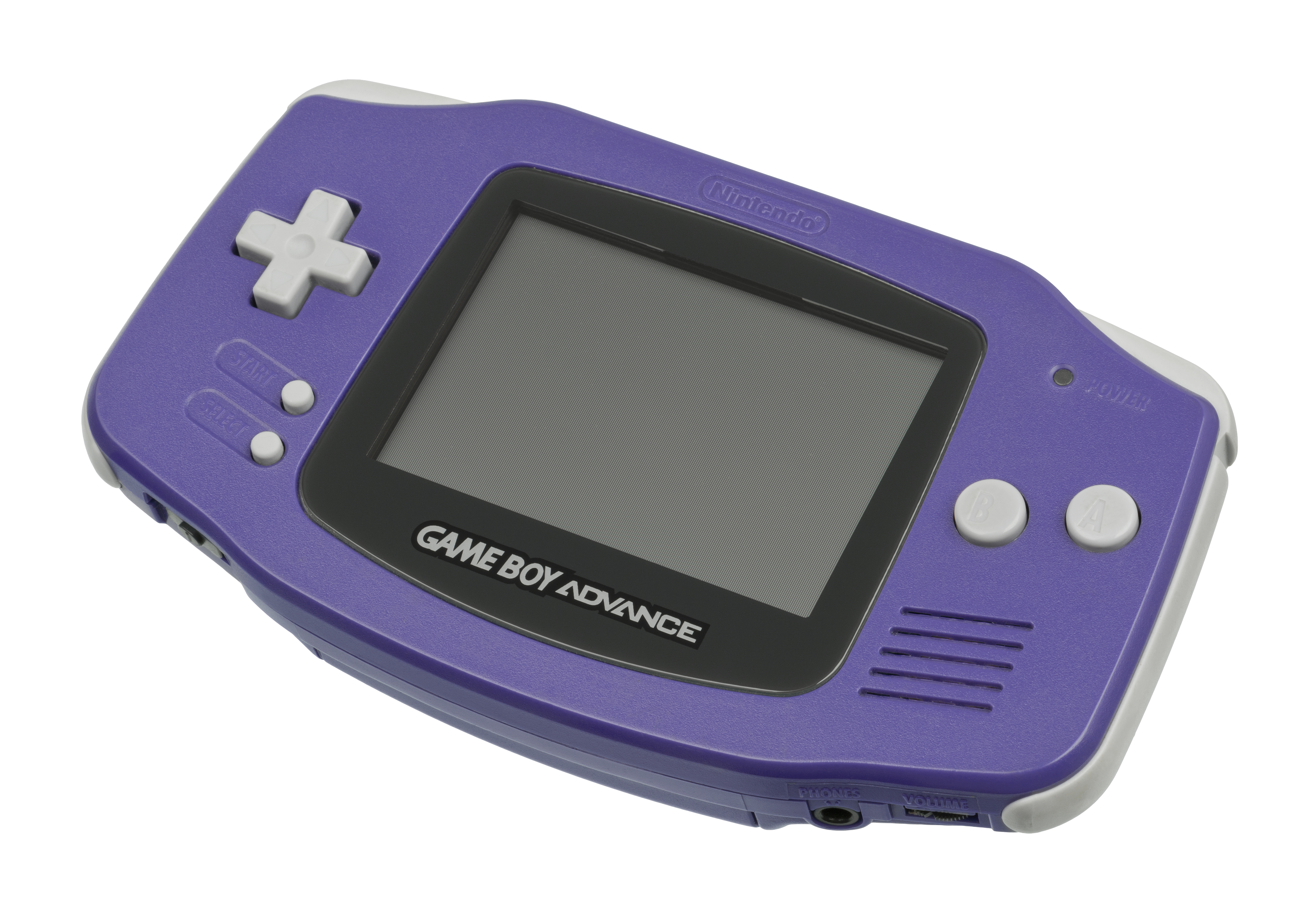
Shantae Advance was in development for the Game Boy Advance before being shelved in 2004. Development was resumed in 2023.

=== Original demo ===
Early design work on Shantae Advance: Risky Revolution began during production of the original Shantae. While production was wrapping on that game, WayForward used their work on The Scorpion King: Sword of Osiris (2002) to test features they wanted to incorporate into the sequel. The ability to move between the foreground and the background was inspired by a similar mechanic in Virtual Boy Wario Land.

A demo of the first world was developed, which WayForward began showing to potential publishers. However, the game failed to find a publisher, largely due to the poor sales of the original game. Not wanting to compromise the game's scope, work on the project was ultimately halted in 2004, and the series would not see a new release until Shantae: Risky's Revenge (2010). While the demo was never released to the public, WayForward streamed a full playthrough of it on October 3, 2013, as part of a promotion for the crowdfunding of Shantae: Half-Genie Hero (2016).

Several graphics and visual assets created for Shantae Advance would go on to be reused for Risky's Revenge, while some of its planned gameplay and story elements would be integrated into later Shantae games. Background movement, swimming, and the mermaid transformation were introduced in Risky's Revenge, while flying between areas on a bird and both new transformations were used in Half-Genie Hero.

=== Revival ===
On July 12, 2023, it was announced that WayForward had resumed development on Shantae Advance, building on the work done for the original demo to fully complete the game, and would be releasing it on a Game Boy Advance cartridge through Limited Run Games. The music is composed by Maddie Lim, who contributed to the soundtrack of the previous Shantae game, Shantae and the Seven Sirens (2019). During a Nintendo Indie World stream, WayForward announced ports for modern consoles, utilizing Limited Run's Carbon Engine and featuring higher-resolution user interface and character portraits, would also be released in 2024. In April 2024, it was announced that the current-generation ports had been delayed to 2025. In June 2024, it was announced that the Game Boy Advance version had also been delayed to 2025.

== Release ==
The Game Boy Advance version of Shantae Advance: Risky Revolution was released on April 21, 2025. Upon release, several internet users claimed that the cartridges they received appeared to contain recycled chips with visual blemishes, and expressed concern that the cartridges could damage their systems. In response, Limited Run Games explained that this was because Retro-Bit Gaming, which manufactured the cartridges, "had to source a lot of new old stock FRAM chips that are no longer widely manufactured", but that there would be "no issues with the operability or function of the cartridges". Retro-Bit also issued a statement that acknowledged some cartridges had "imperfections found on a small number of boards", but assured customers that the cartridges were safe to use. Ports of the game for Nintendo Switch, PlayStation 4, PlayStation 5, Windows, Xbox One and Xbox Series X/S followed on August 19, 2025. The same month, Limited Run Games began accepting preorders for physical releases of these ports, which would be released in December.

== Reception ==
Reception

Aggregate scores
Aggregator	Score
Metacritic	NS: 74/100; PS5: 77/100
OpenCritic	74% recommend

Review scores
Publication	Score
Nintendo Life	7/10
Siliconera	7/10

Shantae Advance: Risky Revolution received "mixed or average" reviews on Nintendo Switch, and "generally favorable reviews" on PlayStation 5, according to review aggregator Metacritic. 74% of critics recommended the game, according to review aggregator OpenCritic.
