= Shantae: Risky's Revenge =

2010 video game

- Developer: WayForward Technologies
- Publisher: WayForward Technologies
- Director: Matt Bozon
- Producer: Matt Bozon
- Designer: James Montagna
- Programmer: Michael Clasgens
- Artist: Henk Nieborg
- Writer: Matt Bozon
- Composer: Jake Kaufman
- Series: Shantae
- Platforms: Nintendo DSi; iOS; Android; Microsoft Windows; PlayStation 4; Wii U; Nintendo Switch; Xbox One; Stadia; PlayStation 5
- Release: Nintendo DSi: NA: October 4, 2010; EU: February 11, 2011; iOS: WW: October 27, 2011; Microsoft Windows: WW: July 15, 2014; PlayStation 4: NA: June 23, 2015; PAL: December 8, 2015; Wii U: WW: March 24, 2016; Nintendo Switch, Xbox One: WW: October 15, 2020; Amazon Luna: US: January 11, 2021; Stadia: WW: February 23, 2021; PlayStation 5: WW: October 19, 2021
- Genres: Platform, Metroidvania
- Mode: Single-player

Shantae: Risky's Revenge is a 2010 platform video game developed and published by WayForward Technologies for the Nintendo DSi. The second installment in the Shantae series, Risky's Revenge is the sequel to the 2002 Game Boy Color video game Shantae, and follows series protagonist Shantae as she sets out to stop the ambitions of the nefarious pirate Risky Boots.

The game was originally released for DSi in October 2010. An iOS port was released on October 27, 2011, featuring a new Magic Mode, while an Android version was released only in Japan. An enhanced version, Shantae: Risky's Revenge - Director's Cut, was released for Microsoft Windows in June 2014, PlayStation 4 in June 2015, Wii U in March 2016, Nintendo Switch and Xbox One in October 2020, Amazon Luna in January 2021, Stadia in February 2021, and PlayStation 5 in October 2021.

The game was met with generally favorable reviews, and its story was directly continued in Shantae and the Pirate's Curse (2014).

== Gameplay ==
Risky’s Revenge is a metroidvania game, where players explore a gated 2D map using various items and upgrades. Players take the role of Shantae, a half-genie who must explore various areas in order to stop her nemesis, an evil pirate named Risky Boots. Shantae's main form of offense is whipping enemies with her hair, and she can also acquire magic spells that allow her to use various ranged attacks. In order to progress through the game, Shantae needs to find various transformation spells. These spells, activated by performing a belly dance, transform Shantae into various animals with unique abilities. These include a monkey that can cling onto certain surfaces and dash between walls, an elephant that can smash rocks to open new areas, and a mermaid that can swim underwater. Players can use these abilities to access new areas and locate special items hidden around the world, including Heart Holders, which increase Shantae's maximum health, and Magic Jam, which players can use to purchase additional upgrades and abilities. Players will receive different ending screens based on their completion time and number of items collected; while a New Game Plus mode allows the player to replay the game with higher magic but lower defense. The DSi version grants players additional gems when starting a new game as a reward for progress in WayForward's previous DSi release, Mighty Flip Champs.

== Plot ==
During the annual Relic Hunters Expo, Shantae and her friends watch her Uncle Mimic unveil his latest find: an ordinary-looking lamp encased in stone. As they wonder its purpose, Risky Boots and her pirates crash the expo and steal the lamp. Shantae battles her, but is knocked out, allowing Risky to escape. Blaming the half-genie for the town being in disarray and failing to do her job properly, Mayor Scuttlebutt fires her as Scuttle Town's Guardian.

Despite no longer being a Guardian Genie, Shantae still decides to take responsibility to stop Risky Boots' newest plot. Mimic reveals to Shantae that three hidden magic seals are necessary to release the lamp's magic, and Shantae sets out to find them. With help from her friend, the zombie Rottytops, she learns that the seals are in possession of three treasure hunters, the Barons of Sequin Land, whom she will have to confront to obtain the seals. While she pursues the Barons, Risky tricks Rottytops and her brothers into kidnapping Mimic for her, promising them a lifetime supply of coffee needed to maintain their sanity, and particularly, Shantae's brains for Rottytops.

Shantae, now in possession of the three seals, reaches them as Risky reveals her deception. Shantae surrenders the seals in exchange for Mimic's life. Risky then sucks Shantae's magical half into the lamp before revealing to Shantae that it has the power to capture and enslave genies, then she unleashes the magical half as the evil Nega-Shantae, ordering it to destroy Shantae. Shantae manages to defeat her counterpart, and flees from Risky's hideout as it collapses. She reunites with her friends, who promise to help her defend Scuttle Town and adjust to her new life as a human. The Mayor, impressed by her commitment, re-hires her as the town's Guardian.

== Development ==
Shortly before the release of Shantae in 2002, WayForward began development on a sequel for the Game Boy Advance, Shantae Advance: Risky Revolution, but the game was shelved after failing to find a publisher due to the first game's poor sales. The company also explored options for a sequel on platforms such as the GameCube, WiiWare (described as being "an ongoing experiment in 2D on the Wii"), and Nintendo DS. However, these projects were eventually scrapped, and the series remained dormant for several years.

On September 15, 2009, Shantae: Risky's Revenge was revealed as a downloadable DSiWare title on Nintendo of America's 2009 Holiday lineup, with a tentative 2009 Q4 release date. It was later scheduled for a Q1 2010 release. As revealed in the November 2009 issue of Nintendo Power, the game was originally intended to be released in three episodic parts. However, WayForward later issued an official press release confirming that Risky's Revenge would ditch its original episodic content plan, and that the full game would be available at launch for 1200 Nintendo Points. In late September, WayForward sent an email to all members of the Shantae Fan Club, officially stating that the game would be available in North America on October 4, 2010. Several concepts and assets originally developed for Risky Revolution were repurposed for use in Risky's Revenge.

Following the game's release on DSi, it was ported to iOS in October 2011. The iOS port features a Magic Mode, giving Shantae increased attack power in exchange for weaker defense. Later, a Director's Cut edition was released for Microsoft Windows in June 2014, featuring a redesigned warp system as well as the Magic Mode from the iOS release. The Director's Cut release was later ported to PlayStation 4 in June 2015 and Wii U in March 2016. In June 2020, WayForward announced they would be porting the Director's Cut release to Nintendo Switch and Xbox One, both digitally and as a limited physical release from Limited Run Games. These ports were released on October 15, 2020. A version for Amazon Luna was released on January 11, 2021. A version for Stadia was released on February 23, 2021, alongside Shantae: Half-Genie Hero Ultimate Edition. The game was also released for PlayStation 5 on October 19, 2021.

== Reception ==
Reception

Aggregate scores
Aggregator	Score
GameRankings	(DS) 86.30% (iOS) 83.00%
Metacritic	(DS) 85/100 (iOS) 75/100

Review scores
Publication	Score
1Up.com	A−
Eurogamer	6/10
GamesRadar+	4.5/5
IGN	9/10
Nintendo Life	10/10
Nintendo World Report	9/10
AppSpy	(iOS) 4/5

Shantae: Risky's Revenge has been well received by critics, achieving 85/100 on Metacritic and an 86% on GameRankings. Several reviewers said that it was one of the best DSiWare titles yet. Critics praised the game for its beautiful visuals, excellent soundtrack, and an old school style that took inspiration from the Castlevania and Metroid series, but with fresh new ideas. Criticism was aimed at the map system, which was viewed as poor. IGN called it a "labor of love, a sequel that doesn't disappoint", and later gave Risky's Revenge the Best Visuals Award and Best DS Game for 2010. The iOS version has been generally well received, though not as well as the DSi version, with a Metacritic score of 75/100 based on seven reviews.
