= Shantae (video game) =

2002 video game

- North American box art
- Developer: WayForward
- Publishers: Capcom (Note: Original Game Boy Color release); WayForward (Note: Digital re-releases); Limited Run Games (Note: Physical re-releases)
- Director: Matt Bozon
- Producer: John Beck
- Designer: Matt Bozon
- Programmer: Jimmy Huey
- Artist: Matt Bozon
- Writer: Matt Bozon
- Composer: Jake Kaufman
- Series: Shantae
- Platforms: Game Boy Color; Nintendo Switch; PlayStation 4 PlayStation 5
- Release: NA: June 4, 2002; Nintendo Switch: WW: April 22, 2021; PlayStation 4/5: WW: June 2, 2023
- Genres: Platform, Metroidvania
- Mode: Single-player

Shantae is a 2002 platform video game developed by WayForward and originally published by Capcom for the Game Boy Color. The video game follows the adventures of the titular half-genie Shantae as she travels across Sequin Land to thwart the domination plans of the evil lady pirate Risky Boots. During her quest, she learns various dances and acquires items which make her progressively stronger as well as unlocking new abilities and locations, culminating in a final showdown with Risky at her hideout.

Upon its release, Shantae received favorable reviews but struggled to find an audience due to its launch a year after the Game Boy Color was succeeded by the Game Boy Advance. Despite this, it has since been recognized as a "cult classic" and is frequently included in lists of the best Game Boy Color games. The game later spawned a successful series of sequels. Shantae was re-released for the Nintendo 3DS in 2013 via the Virtual Console emulator, marking its debut in Europe. The original version was re-released for the Nintendo Switch in April 2021, with PlayStation 4 and PlayStation 5 versions released in June 2023.

== Gameplay ==
The player character, Shantae, traverses a forest area.

Shantae is a platform-adventure game, in which players play as the titular Shantae, a half-genie who must travel across various areas in order to stop the evil lady pirate Risky Boots. Shantae's default attack involves using her hair like a whip. Shantae can also use gems obtained from defeated enemies to purchase items, such as life-restoring potions and damaging items with various uses, as well as learn upgraded combat moves. The game features five towns, with various areas filled with enemies and obstacles in between them. In order to progress through the game, Shantae must seek out various characters who will open up dungeons, with each dungeon containing a guardian genie that will teach Shantae a new dance. By using these dances, Shantae can transform herself into different animals, including a monkey that can climb on walls, an elephant that can smash objects such as boulders and tree stumps, a spider that can climb across webbing in the background, and a harpy that can fly in mid-air. Shantae must use these abilities to reach new areas or find hidden items.

The game features a day and night cycle, with enemies becoming stronger during the night. During nighttime, players can collect hidden fireflies, with a reward available for collecting them all. Other collectible creatures include Warp Squids, which are squid-shaped items hidden within dungeons, and which can be given to larger mother squids in each town in exchange for the ability to instantly warp there. Finally, heart vessels can be obtained to increase Shantae's maximum health. The game also features various minigames, such as dancing or gambling, in order to earn additional gems.

== Plot ==
The magical kingdom of Sequin Land was once protected by Guardian Genies, who won the land years of peace. With time, genies fell in love with humans and had children with them, half-genies with limited magical powers. For obscure reasons, genies ultimately vanished, with their children taking their place as protectors of the land. One of these half-genies, Shantae, is appointed as the guardian of the small fishing village of Scuttle Town, though the town's mayor does not realize she is not a full genie.

Scuttle Town comes under attack by Risky Boots, the self proclaimed "Queen of the Seven Seas", and her pirate crew of Tinkerbat creatures. The pirates steal a prototype steam engine from Mimic, a former adventurer and Shantae's adoptive uncle. Mimic explains that if Risky retrieves four magical "elemental stones", she could power up the steam engine and create an unstoppable weapon out of it. Shantae resolves to travel across Sequin Land, determined to retrieve the steam engine and the elemental stones and stop Risky.

With help from her sparring partner Bolo, her childhood friend Sky, and new zombie acquaintance Rottytops, Shantae gains access to dungeons containing each of the elemental stones. Upon retrieving the final stone, she is ambushed at the dungeon's exit by Risky, who steals the stones and escapes. Using a magical Spy Scope, Shantae locates and is transported to Risky's island hideout. There, Risky reveals she has constructed a massive robot, the Tinkertank, which she plans to use to conquer Sequin Land. Shantae destroys the Tinkertank and defeats Risky in a final duel, before both flee as Risky's hideout collapses.

As Shantae escapes, she is magically abducted to a place called the Genie Realm, where the genies offer her a chance to remain with them as a reward for her courage. Realizing this would mean never seeing her friends again, Shantae declines and is sent back to Scuttle Town. Though disappointed that she had to destroy the steam engine, Mimic reassures her that it was probably for the best. Shantae decides to tell the mayor that she is a half-genie, who assures her that he is fine with it.

== Development ==
=== Game development ===
The game was considered for development by WayForward as far back as 1997. An archived version of the company's official website showcases a very different approach to the game, which was at the time considered for development on PC or PlayStation, in full 3D with traditionally animated characters moving in a 3D background. Shantae was presented as a troubled genie born without magic powers, who had to save the world from the Jins, powerful beings once sealed who escaped at the beginning of the game and planned to drain all magic from the world. Back then, her magic was capable, as envisioned by Erin Bozon, the original creator of the character, of summoning animals, but transformation was already planned, as Shantae could turn into a harpy. Her dances could also launch attacks and she had different outfits with different characteristics.

In the idea of Matt Bozon, who created the game's universe based on Erin's character, at the beginning, the game was planned for the SNES. He and Erin pitched the game with help from veteran programmer Jimmy Huey, who worked with WayForward at the time. After the completion of Xtreme Sports, Voldi Way, the founder and owner of WayForward, greenlit a Game Boy Color version of the game. As Huey had already built a graphics engine for Xtreme Sports, this engine was adapted to suit Shantae's needs. This allowed the game to showcase rare effects on GBC games, like parallax scrolling and transparency effects. In the first four months of development, the team created most of the animation, and Huey programmed an art-capturing tool that could take full-colored animation frames, turn them into three-color chunks and reassemble the whole on the GBC's screen.

=== Publishing ===
The Game Boy Game Pak for Shantae needed 4 megabytes of ROM and battery-backed RAM to work properly, making it expensive to produce. This factor deterred some publishers, alongside the fact that launching a new intellectual property was considered dicey. WayForward tried to find a publisher for years, before Capcom eventually picked the game for release. Capcom, however, held the release for months, during which the Game Boy Advance was released. It is rumored that the game had only one run of 20–25,000 copies.

WayForward saw when the game was played on the Game Boy Advance, the console's screen had a tendency to darken the colors, so they added a Game Boy Advance enhancement that brightened the screen and added a few bonus features.

=== Music ===
In 2000, the sound was developed using the Musyx audio format, but WayForward chose to switch during development. The soundtrack featured about 20 songs at the time, and was composed by Jake Kaufman. Kaufman ultimately used the Paragon 5 GameBoy Tracker to create the music. Paragon 5's CEO, Paul Bragiel, served as music producer, and Stephane Hockenhull performed music replay.

The soundtrack to the game was released in January 2019 by Fangamer in a red vinyl format, with a limited edition purple variant published by Limited Run Games.

== Reception ==
=== Sales and analysis ===
Precise sales figures for the game have not been made public, but according to Bozon, it sold poorly; he said that he had heard that 20–25,000 copies of the game were produced, which did sell out, but that a second print run did not get made.

Matt Bozon has refused to blame Capcom, the publisher of the game, for responsibility in the game's failure. This was despite Capcom holding it for 8 months after completion, with the game finally releasing when the Game Boy Advance was already in its first year of existence. He says he went in "very naive", believing that if the game was good, it would sell anyway. Bozon believed that from a creative standpoint, he never really settled on a target audience, with the character being "iconoclastic", "too sexy to be a kid's brand, and too girly for a male gamer brand". Also, before the game was even released, Bozon claims that he had come to understand anyway that the game "would probably not sell", as during WayForward's search for a publisher, many market analysts were skeptical at the idea of having a female lead character, and Bozon ultimately acknowledged that they probably "genuinely knew their markets". He still did not give up, as he felt that Shantae had to exist, "even if it was just to reach out and see if there was an audience reaching back."

=== Critical reception ===
Reception

Aggregate score
Aggregator	Score
GameRankings	78%

Review scores
Publication	Score
AllGame	4.5/5
Game Informer	3/10
GamePro	4.5/5
GameSpot	7.7/10
IGN	9/10
Nintendo Life	9/10 (GBC); 8/10 (3DS)
Nintendo Power	4/5, 4/5, 5/5, 5/5, 4/5

Shantae was generally well received by contemporaneous critics. IGN called it a "wonderful platform adventure", with "tons of variety in its level and character design", adding that it "looks fantastic as a Game Boy Color game". GameSpot claimed it to be a "fine example" of a portable platformer, "firmly rooted in the traditional conventions of the [platform game] genre", and added that "one area that this game truly shines in is the animation", although they complained about the music being "simple" and "repetitive", with "bland" sound effects. Jenni Villarreal of Nintendo Power praised the game's graphics and gameplay, writing that it "outclasses" most Game Boy Advance games. However, Andy McNamara for Game Informer was less positive, saying "the game just isn't compelling enough to keep you playing."

Retrospective reviews were positive as well, with Kaes Delgrego and Corbie Dillard of Nintendo Life and Kyle MacGregor of Destructoid claiming the game to be a "cult classic". Delgrego added that it was a "love-letter to the side-scrolling epic adventures of the NES". He added that the graphics and sound are "outstanding", although acknowledged some issues with the tiny screen of the Game Boy and overall lack of guidance in-game. Delgrego concluded by saying the game "does proper justice to the golden era of gaming". A new 2013 review for the re-release of the game on the Nintendo 3DS Virtual Console by Mike Mason claimed that the "2D platformer is sprinkled with enough genie-magic to keep it fresh and interesting for a modern audience."

Shantae was nominated in several lists of the best Game Boy games. Game Informer's Ben Reeves called Shantae the 15th best Game Boy game and felt that it was overlooked. Complex named it the 7th best GBC game in 2013, calling it a "solid platformer". GamesRadar ranked it as the 8th best Game Boy game, saying that "Shantae's filled with typical 2D platformer stuff [...] but it's all done remarkably well and with a visual flair the GBC rarely saw". In 2018, the game was ranked as the 9th best GB/GBC game by French website Jeuxvideo.com, calling it an "excellent action-platforming game with superb art direction".

Because of the success of its sequels and its very positive critical reviews, as well as the short initial run of cartridges, Shantae has become one of the most sought-after and rare Game Boy Color games.

== Sequels ==
Several plans for a Shantae sequel were made, including Shantae Advance: Risky Revolution for the Game Boy Advance, and Shantae: Risky Waters for the Nintendo DS. On September 15, 2009, a sequel titled Shantae: Risky's Revenge was announced, and revealed as a downloadable DSiWare title on Nintendo of America's 2009 Holiday lineup, with a tentative 2009 Q4 release date. Details on the 3-part episodic sequels were revealed in the November 2009 issue of Nintendo Power. However, plans for the episodic release were cancelled, and the game was instead released as a stand-alone sequel for DSiWare on October 4, 2010. The game was later ported to iOS, Microsoft Windows and PlayStation 4. A third game, Shantae and the Pirate's Curse, was released on the Nintendo 3DS eShop on October 23, 2014. Later the game was also released on Wii U, Microsoft Windows, PlayStation 4, Xbox One and Amazon Fire TV. A fourth title, Shantae: Half-Genie Hero, was released for Microsoft Windows, PlayStation 4, PlayStation Vita, Wii U, Xbox One and Nintendo Switch; it is the first HD game in the series. The game was successfully crowdfunded via Kickstarter and PayPal, receiving nearly $950,000, more than doubling its initial goal. A fifth game, Shantae and the Seven Sirens, was released for Apple Arcade in 2019, and for PC, PlayStation 4, Xbox One, and Nintendo Switch in 2020. The previously canceled sequel, Risky Revolution, was later released in 2025 as the sixth game in the series.

== Re-releases ==
Shantae was digitally re-released by WayForward via the Nintendo 3DS Virtual Console on July 18, 2013. This marked the game's first official release in Europe, Australia and New Zealand.

In July 2020, Limited Run Games announced they would be producing a brief run of new Shantae cartridges for Game Boy Color, with pre-orders scheduled to begin the following September. WayForward also announced that they would be releasing a port of the game for Nintendo Switch, both digitally and as a limited physical release from Limited Run. The port, released on April 22, 2021, allows players to toggle the Game Boy Advance enhancements on and off; it also includes save state functionality, alternate display options, and an in-game art gallery. Homebrew developer Dimitris Giannakis, who runs the YouTube channel Modern Vintage Gamer, was hired to develop the emulation software used in this release, known as the Carbon Engine; Limited Run has since utilized the Carbon Engine in several subsequent game re-releases for modern hardware. Versions for PlayStation 4 and PlayStation 5 were released on June 2, 2023.
