= Shantae =

Video game series

- Genres: Platform, action-adventure, Metroidvania
- Developer: WayForward
- Publisher: WayForward (Note: Capcom published the original game for the Game Boy Color. Rising Star Games, Xseed Games, PQube, Crunchyroll Games, Oizumi Amuzio, and Limited Run Games have all published platform-specific releases.)
- Creators: Erin Bozon; Matt Bozon
- Composers: Jake Kaufman (2002–2016); Prof. Sakamoto (2019); Mark Sparling (2019); Maddie Lim (2019–present)
- Platforms: Amazon Fire TV; Amazon Luna; Android; Game Boy Advance; Game Boy Color; iOS; macOS; Nintendo 3DS; Nintendo DSi; Nintendo Switch; PlayStation 4; PlayStation 5; PlayStation Vita; Google Stadia; Wii U; Windows; Xbox One; Xbox Series X/S
- First release: Shantae; June 4, 2002
- Latest release: Shantae Advance: Risky Revolution; April 21, 2025

Shantae is a series of platform video games developed by American independent video game developer and publisher WayForward. The eponymous heroine of the series was created by Erin Bozon, while the games were created by her husband Matt Bozon. The series began in 2002 with the original Shantae, and currently consists of six games, with a seventh in development.

Set in the fictional world of Sequin Land, the series follows Shantae, a half-genie who serves as the guardian of her hometown, Scuttle Town, and more generally Sequin Land as a whole, protecting it from various threats, which generally involve her nemesis, the pirate Risky Boots. The setting features oriental-inspired aesthetics with fantasy, dark fantasy and steampunk elements. All games involve collecting new powers and items, which vary from game to game, to strengthen Shantae and unlock access to new areas.

Although released to positive reviews, the first game was a financial disappointment. Its poor sales are generally attributed to its late release on the Game Boy Color, which at the time had been succeeded by the Game Boy Advance. The series resurfaced in 2010 with Risky's Revenge, and has since enjoyed more commercial success and a growth in popularity. The series has been met with strong critical reception, and is considered WayForward's flagship series. By 2020, the series had sold more than three million copies.

== History and development ==
Early designs for Shantae

Shantae was created by Erin Bell, the wife of Matt Bozon, the game's creator. In 1994, during their engagement, Erin got a flash of inspiration while coming back from her camp counsellor days, and created the character, naming her "Shantae" after one of the campers, as well as developing her dancing abilities. Matt later asked her what she would come up with if she was to create a video game character, and she introduced him to Shantae. Matt liked the idea and fleshed out the mythology and cast of the game. Erin imagined that the character could summon or charm animals by belly-dancing. This would later become the basis for the transformation dances. Matt has provided two contradictory stories about how the idea for the hair whip came to be: in one, he said he was inspired by the nine-foot-long hair of his wife, while in the other he claims that Erin's original sketches already featured Shantae using her hair as a weapon.

By 1997, Shantae's design was still not completely locked, as she sported brown hair, didn't wear earrings but wore golden bracelets, and had different proportions. At that point, her magic was still meant to summon animals, her dances were generating magical attacks based on the four elements, and she had different outfits giving her different abilities. By the year 2000, Matt Bozon had locked the final proportions and her ultimate graphical style, adding earrings and replacing the bracelets with wrist guards, and coloring her hair into her signature purple. After the first game, Matt Bozon worked to make the character easier for other people to work with. Her hip sash was progressively removed, and attempts to turn the character into 3-D generated a new batch of issues as her initial appearance had to be revamped to make her look more natural, with her hair in particular blocking the view and needing to move naturally. Various experiments were done to make her feel more kid-like and heroic, but feedback was mixed, which led to reverting to a look closer to her original one, but with the clothing alterations kept. For Shantae: Half-Genie Hero, her proportions were altered, being described by WayForward as featuring "[a] bowling pin shaped body, [...] very tall eyes, [...] [a] long torso, and black triangular pants" with the main aim being on-screen contrast and readability regardless of the distance from the camera. Her lighter skin on the first sketches in contrast to her former design generated minor controversy, and WayForward worked to fix it later on.

Matt Bozon has stated that his main influences for the video game series are Castlevania, Aladdin, Mega Man, The Legend of Zelda, and anime, including Ranma ½—which he cites as a major influence—and others like Nadia: The Secret of Blue Water, Hayao Miyazaki's films, and Pokémon, as well as 1980s American cartoons like DuckTales and The Transformers, while Erin Bozon's main influence was I Dream of Jeannie. The signature catchphrase from the franchise, "Ret-2-Go", was created by a friend of theirs who kept using it when they were working on animation clean up for the Warner Bros. animated film The Iron Giant, and the expression made its way into the script as an inside joke. Matt also elaborated a bit on the development of Sky's character, who was initially named "Twitch" and had a different appearance. She was altered later on in development, and the original Twitch character served as the basis for a similarly-named character and her friend in Shantae and the Pirate's Curse.

Publishers were initially skeptical regarding the character, and asked Matt Bozon to consider switching to a male lead, as they believed male gamers would never play as a female lead character. Matt Bozon stood by Shantae, believing that she "had to exist" to see "if there was an audience reaching back", although, after the game's commercial failure, he later acknowledged that publishers probably "genuinely knew their markets". Despite the initial difficulties, the series' lasting critical appeal led WayForward to adopt Shantae as their official mascot. When asked about whether the Shantae series was conceived as pushing feminist values because of its strong female cast, Matt Bozon acknowledged that he liked to portray the Shantae world as having the girls "run the show" and not be defined solely by their appearances. While he admitted that most female characters had a deliberately sexy design to them, and the male characters often displayed a variety of weaknesses, he also said that he just liked depicting Shantae's world this way "for no precise reason", and that it was certainly possible that strong male characters could appear later in the franchise's future.

== Characters ==
=== Shantae ===
Voiced by: Meagan Glaser (Risky's Revenge, Risky Revolution), Cristina Vee (all other appearances)

Shantae is a half-genie, the daughter of a human father and genie mother. She is described as having few magical abilities, including the ability to whip her hair as a weapon, but is a skilled dancer and has a strong sense of right and wrong.

=== Mimic ===
Voiced by: Xander Mobus

Mimic is a member of the Relic Hunters, a society of treasure hunters who unearth and study ancient artifacts. Although not related to her by blood, he is Shantae's adoptive uncle, as he found and raised her after her parents' disappearance.

=== Sky ===
Voiced by: Karen Strassman

Sky is Shantae's friend, a war bird trainer and the daughter of a Relic Hunter. Never seen without her pet war bird Wrench, she is described as being in a hurry to grow up. Sky appears as a playable character in Half-Genie Hero's "Friends to the End" mode.

=== Bolo ===
Voiced by: Nathan Sharp (Half-Genie Hero), Ross O'Donovan (Seven Sirens)

Bolo is Shantae's friend and sparring partner. He is described as being rather slow and very easily attracted to girls, though he seeks to prove himself as capable of being a hero. Risky Revolution introduces his little brother, Pongo. Bolo appears as a playable character in Half-Genie Hero's "Friends to the End" mode.

=== Rottytops ===
Voiced by: Cherami Leigh

Rottytops is Shantae's friend, a sentient zombie girl who is described as being mischievous and constantly getting others into trouble for fun. Risky's Revenge introduces her two brothers, Abner Cadaver and Poe. Rottytops appears as a playable character in Half-Genie Hero's "Friends to the End" mode.

=== Risky Boots ===
Voiced by: Cristina Vee

Risky Boots the lady-pirate is Shantae's evil nemesis and the series' primary antagonist. She constantly seeks to conquer Sequin Land or take revenge on Shantae for ruining her schemes. Risky is aided by her pirate crew, made up of tiny humanoid creatures called Tinkerbats. Despite being a villain for most of the series, Risky aids Shantae against the Pirate Master, Risky's former captain, in Shantae and the Pirate's Curse, and appears as a playable character in Half-Genie Hero's "Pirate Queen's Quest" mode.

== Games ==
Aggregate review scores
Game	Metacritic
Shantae	(GBC) 78% (Note: GameRankings score)
Shantae: Risky's Revenge	(NDS) 85/100 (Wii U) 77/100 (iOS) 75/100 (PS4) 74/100
Shantae and the Pirate's Curse	(NS) 86/100 (Wii U) 85/100 (3DS) 82/100 (XONE) 79/100 (PS4) 75/100
Shantae: Half-Genie Hero	(Vita) 82/100 (NS) 82/100 (PS4) 81/100 (Wii U) 80/100 (XONE) 80/100 (PC) 76/100
Shantae and the Seven Sirens	(NS) 81/100 (PC) 80/100 (PS4) 70/100 (XONE) 68/100
Shantae Advance: Risky Revolution	(NS) 74/100 (PS5) 77/100

Release timeline
2002	Shantae
2003–2009
2010	Shantae: Risky's Revenge
2011–2013
2014	Shantae and the Pirate's Curse
2015
2016	Shantae: Half-Genie Hero
2017–2018
2019	Shantae and the Seven Sirens
2020–2024
2025	Shantae Advance: Risky Revolution

=== Shantae (2002) ===
The first game in the series, Shantae, was released for the Game Boy Color in 2002, and was met with generally positive responses. However, according to director Matt Bozon, the game sold poorly, due in part to releasing after the Game Boy Advance. However, the game has since gained significant recognition, with some reviewers considering it one of the best games released for the Game Boy Color.

The game was re-released for the Nintendo 3DS Virtual Console in 2013. A Nintendo Switch version was later released in 2021, with a special Game Boy Advance-enhanced mode, featuring a bonus Tinkerbat transformation and save states, multiple display options, control improvements, and a mini art gallery.

=== Shantae: Risky's Revenge (2010) ===
The second game in the series, Shantae: Risky's Revenge, was released for the Nintendo DSi via the system's DSiWare service in 2010, and was later ported to iOS in 2011. The game received positive reviews, being awarded the Best Visuals and Best DS Game awards for 2010 from IGN.

An enhanced port, titled Shantae: Risky's Revenge – Director's Cut, was released for Microsoft Windows in 2014, PlayStation 4 in 2015, Wii U in 2016, Nintendo Switch and Xbox One in 2020, and Google Stadia in 2021.

=== Shantae and the Pirate's Curse (2014) ===
The third game in the series, Shantae and the Pirate's Curse, was released for Nintendo 3DS and Wii U in 2014, both via the Nintendo eShop. The game received critical acclaim, and was featured in the best sellers list on the 3DS eShop soon after release. The game was later ported to Microsoft Windows, PlayStation 4, Xbox One, and Nintendo Switch.

=== Shantae: Half-Genie Hero (2016) ===
The fourth game in the series, Shantae: Half-Genie Hero, was crowdfunded via a Kickstarter campaign in 2013. The game was released digitally and physically in 2016 for Wii U, PlayStation 4 and PlayStation Vita, and digitally on Microsoft Windows and Xbox One. It was also released on Nintendo Switch in 2017, and Google Stadia in 2021.

=== Shantae and the Seven Sirens (2019) ===
The fifth game in the series, Shantae and the Seven Sirens was first released via the Apple Arcade service in 2019. Ports for Microsoft Windows, Nintendo Switch, PlayStation 4 and Xbox One were released in 2020.

=== Shantae Advance: Risky Revolution (2025) ===
The sixth game in the series, Shantae Advance: Risky Revolution, originally began development for the Game Boy Advance in 2002 following the completion of the original Shantae, but was cancelled in 2004 after WayForward failed to find a publisher. On July 12, 2023, it was announced that development was resuming, and that Limited Run Games would distribute physical Game Boy Advance cartridges in 2024, later delayed to 2025. Ports for Nintendo Switch, PlayStation 4, PlayStation 5, Xbox One, Xbox Series X/S, and Windows followed later that year.

=== Future ===
In October 2025, WayForward announced the development of a seventh Shantae game, currently planned for a 2027 release.

=== Canceled games ===
Plans for a sequel to Shantae started soon after its release. In the early 2000s, WayForward experimented with protoyping a 3D Shantae game for the GameCube, but these plans were set aside in favor of focusing on a handheld sequel.

Another attempt at a Shantae sequel was Shantae: Risky Waters, a game planned for the Nintendo DS with experimental gameplay taking advantage of the double screen function of the console. Plans were scrapped after WayForward failed to find a publisher.

== In other media ==
Some characters from the series have made crossover appearances in other games: Shantae and Bolo appear as playable characters in the Apple Watch game Watch Quest. A Shantae-themed microgame, "Shantae NAB!", was created by Matt Bozon in WarioWare D.I.Y. and distributed by Nintendo as one of its "Big Name Games" entries. Risky Boots was meant to be featured in Hyper Light Drifter by Heart Machine, as part of a mutual support action between the Kickstarter funding campaigns for that game and Half-Genie Hero, but this was absent from the final game. Shantae appeared as a guest character in Mutant Mudds Super Challenge and in Runbow and Blaster Master Zero as a downloadable guest character. Both Shantae and Risky Boots appear in Super Smash Bros. Ultimate as spirits, with Shantae later becoming available as a Mii Brawler costume via downloadable content alongside the "Neo Burning Town" music track from Shantae: Half-Genie Hero on June 29, 2021. Shantae was planned to be featured as a playable supporting character in the crowdfunded game Indivisible, but was later canceled. A set of cosmetics based on Shantae was released as free downloadable content for Bloodstained: Ritual of the Night in 2024.

Merchandise of Shantae characters has also been produced. These include a line of Charagumin model kits from Volks, and a Nendoroid figure from Good Smile Company. A one-shot comic based on the series was released by Udon Entertainment in 2024.
