= Saturday Morning RPG =

2012 video game

- Cover art of Saturday Morning RPG
- Developer: Mighty Rabbit Studios
- Publishers: Mighty Rabbit Studios; Joystick Labs (iOS)
- Designer: Josh Fairhurst
- Composer: Vince DiCola
- Engine: Unity
- Platforms: Microsoft Windows, iOS, OS X, Ouya, Linux, Android, PlayStation 4, PlayStation Vita, Xbox One, Nintendo Switch
- Release: iOS: WW: April 5, 2012; Android: WW: March 27, 2013; Windows, OS X, Linux: WW: September 10, 2013; PlayStation 4, PlayStation Vita: NA: January 29, 2016; Nintendo Switch: NA: April 26, 2018
- Genre: Role-playing
- Mode: Single-player

Saturday Morning RPG is a role-playing video game, created by developer Mighty Rabbit Studios. The game was first released for iOS in April 2012. It has been released on PC, Mac, and Linux through Steam. It is also available on Ouya, and was a launch title for the system. In the game, players control Marty, an average high school student who gains an extraordinary power through a magical notebook that resembles a Trapper Keeper. This power allows him to use everyday objects in battle against the evil forces of the HOOD. As players advance through the game, they will discover new battle objects and new foes to fight. Mighty Rabbit Studios has supported Saturday Morning RPG with updates since its release in 2012 – adding two new episodes: To Bot or Not to Bot (Episode 3) and Ho Ho HOOD (Episode 4). The game is steeped in 1980s nostalgia (mainly of the Saturday-morning cartoon variety) – many of the enemies and battle objects draw directly from the pop culture of the time.

Vince DiCola and his composing partner Kenny Meriedeth provided the game's soundtrack, with a guest appearance by Stemage.

On January 15, 2018, it was announced that the game would be coming to Nintendo Switch in Spring 2018.

== Gameplay ==
Saturday Morning RPG fits into the Japanese role-playing game subgenre of role-playing video games. In the game, players control the main character, Marty, and navigate an open world occasionally triggering battles with enemies. Battles in the game deviate from the standard Japanese role-playing game systems by giving the player some degree of active control during battles. Some attacks require additional inputs to power up and all enemy attacks can be blocked with a well-timed button press. While not in battle, players can discover new items to use in fights, partake in a number of side quests, and earn experience by exploring the environments. Players can also discover power enhancing Scratch and sniff stickers in the world that can be attached to their notebook. These stickers must be scratched at the beginning of battle to unleash their effects.

Saturday Morning RPG's story is structured in an episodic fashion, much like the Saturday-morning cartoons it draws inspiration from. Episodes can be played and replayed in any order, and any player stats or items earned can be transferred between episodes. There are currently five episodes of Saturday Morning RPG.

== Development ==
Saturday Morning RPG began development in 2010 during the inaugural session of Joystick Labs, a video game developer incubator. Development continued for nearly two years until its release in 2012 on iOS. Two years later on January 29, 2014 – the game was released on Steam. A fifth episode of the game is currently in development, and the developers have announced plans to release the game on the Wii U. A physical disc release of the game for the PlayStation 4 and PlayStation Vita was announced to be released on January 29, 2016, available through Mighty Rabbit Studios' online store Limited Run Games, which specializes in physical releases of indie games for Sony platforms. The physical version is limited to 1980 copies on PlayStation 4 and 2500 copies on PlayStation Vita.

== Release ==
Saturday Morning RPG was initially released for iOS on April 5, 2012.

On January 29, 2016, the game was released on physical copy for PlayStation 4 and PlayStation Vita in limited supply. 1,980 copies of the PlayStation 4 version and 2,500 copies of the PlayStation Vita version were printed. They were sold and distributed through the website of Limited Run Games.

The game came to Nintendo Switch digitally and physically through Limited Run Games in Spring 2018.

== Reception ==
Saturday Morning RPG

Aggregate score
Aggregator	Score
Metacritic	iOS: 74%

Review score
Publication	Score
Pocket Gamer	iOS: 9.0/10

The iOS version of Saturday Morning RPG has generally received mixed to positive reviews from review sites and game publications. Damien McFerran of Pocket Gamer gave the game a 9 out of 10 stating that the game was an "homage to '80s pop culture and a legitimately entertaining role-playing title to boot, Saturday Morning RPG is as unique as it is enjoyable.". Lower review scores criticized the game's difficulty – David Oxford of Slidetoplay stated that "even if you like Saturday Morning RPG's style, the battles can be really tough and drawn out". Slidetoplay issued an update to their review stating that Mighty Rabbit Studios had addressed many of their concerns with the first update of Saturday Morning RPG.

Reviews for the game's PC version have generally been more positive than reviews for the iOS version, with ZTDG giving the game a 9 out of 10 and an editor's choice award.
