= Golf Story =

2017 role-playing sports adventure video game

- Nintendo eShop storefront artwork, featuring the game's various settings
- Developer: Sidebar Games
- Publisher: Sidebar Games
- Composer: Joel Steudler
- Platform: Nintendo Switch
- Release: 28 September 2017
- Genres: Role-playing, adventure, sports
- Modes: Single-player, multiplayer

Golf Story is a 2017 video game developed and published by Australian studio Sidebar Games for the Nintendo Switch. The game was released on 28 September 2017. Golf Story is an adventure game with role-playing (RPG) elements based on the sport of golf. Originally designed as a Wii U release, Golf Story had a lengthy development time, and Sidebar sought assistance from Nintendo to finish the game and release it for the Switch. It was primarily inspired by the Game Boy Color version of Mario Golf, released in 1999.

Golf Story received generally positive reviews, with critics praising the game's tone, story, and characters, although the RPG mechanics and lack of originality were less well received. The game was nominated for several awards and won the best original sports game at the National Academy of Video Game Trade Reviewers Awards. A sequel, Sports Story, was released for the Nintendo Switch in December 2022.

== Gameplay and synopsis ==
The game takes place over several different locales, including an icy land.

Golf Story is a top-down adventure game based on the sport of golf. The game follows a down-on-his-luck golfer attempting to reclaim his childhood love of the game, passed down to him by his father, after not playing the game for 20 years. The player character attempts to impress his estranged wife and play on the professional tour.

The game is presented as a traditional role-playing game (RPG), with the character gaining skills in power and accuracy. The game features eight unique areas each filled with side quests and minigames that allow the player to earn experience and money, which can be used to develop the player's skills and purchase new equipment. Each area includes a nine-hole golf course that can be played after certain missions are completed. Golf is played a three-click system, in which player clicks once to aim, once to set power, and once to set accuracy. The player is capable of playing shots from any location, allowing them to obtain collectables and secrets. In addition to traditional golf, the game also features a handful of cousin sports, including disc golf, miniature golf, an Atari-like golfing mini game, a driving range, and bowls.

== Development and release ==
Golf Story was originally in development as a Wii U title by Sidebar Games, a development studio made up of a two-man team from Queensland, Australia. This was set to be Sidebar Games' first home console release, having worked on smaller games for the prior eight years. Due to a lengthy development time from expansion of the game's scope, development moved over to the Nintendo Switch after the end of Wii U's lifespan. This also allowed Sidebar to get assistance from Nintendo to finish development of the game. Golf Story was influenced by various past golf video game titles, and particularly the Game Boy Color version of Mario Golf. A split-screen two player story mode was originally planned for Golf Story, but was cut before release.

Golf Story was released in North America, Europe, and Australia on 28 September 2017, and in Japan on 9 March 2018, published by Flyhigh Works. A limited physical retail release, published by Limited Run Games in North America, became available starting on 28 September 2018. Downloadable content was originally planned for the game's post-release, adding more courses, but focus instead shifted in favour of a sequel.

== Reception ==
Reception

Aggregate scores
Aggregator	Score
Metacritic	78/100
OpenCritic	75% recommend

Review scores
Publication	Score
Destructoid	9/10
Eurogamer	4/5
Game Informer	9/10
GameSpot	8/10
IGN	7.5/10
Nintendo Life	9/10

The game received "generally favourable reviews" according to media review aggregator website Metacritic, based on 39 critic reviews. Fellow review aggregator OpenCritic assessed that the game received strong approval, being recommended by 75% of critics. Critics were positive about the games feel and its charm. Martin Robinson writing for Eurogamer called it "one of the finer games you'll find on Nintendo's Switch this year," Robinson also said that despite the game not being the best golf game or RPG, it was a "irresistible and harmonious combination" of the two. Gita Jackson of Kotaku said "Golf Story is a Nintendo Switch RPG you should play," and despite not being a fan of golf, they had a newfound appreciation for the game.

The game also gained appreciation for its story and characters. Pocket Gamer's Emily Sowden commented "the golfing element is fun, the story is interesting, the characters are great, and the game's unlike most of the things we've seen on Switch so far." Andrew Reiner of Game Informer commented "Golf Story makes you care about the characters and their world just as much as sinking a do-or-die putt" before calling it a "breath of fresh air". A review from Miguel Angel Escudero writing for IGN said it "overflows with charisma". Ginny Woo writing for GameSpot commented, "successfully captured the trappings of yesteryear's RPGs, and the witticisms and idiosyncrasies of the characters you encounter are a great palate cleanser between rounds."

While the majority of the reviews were mostly positive, some reviewers felt the RPG was lacking in crucial areas, such as game mechanics and originality. RPGamer's Alex Fuller noted "...it can be argued that the game doesn't provide anything overly new...".

Eurogamer ranked Golf Story 50th on their list of the "Top 50 Games of 2017", while Electronic Gaming Monthly ranked it 24th in their list of the 25 Best Games of 2017.

=== Awards ===
The game was nominated for "Best Switch Game" in Destructoid's Game of the Year Awards 2017, and for "Best Switch Game" and "Best RPG" in IGN's Best of 2017 Awards. It won the award for "Biggest Surprise" in Game Informer's 2017 RPG of the Year Awards.

Year	Award	Category	Result	Ref
2017	The Game Awards 2017	Best Debut Indie Game	Nominated	
2018	National Academy of Video Game Trade Reviewers Awards	Game, Original Sports	Won	
2018	Game Developers Choice Awards	Best Debut (Sidebar Games)	Nominated	

== Sequel ==
On 10 December 2019, a sequel was announced in a Nintendo Indie World showcase. The game, titled Sports Story, features more types of sports in addition to golf, such as tennis, soccer, cricket, and volleyball, and retains the first game's mix of sports, role-playing, and adventure gameplay. Originally set for a mid-2020 release as a Nintendo Switch exclusive, it was ultimately released on 23 December 2022.
