= Sports Story =

2022 video game

- Sports Story eShop cover art
- Developer: Sidebar Games
- Publisher: Sidebar Games
- Platform: Nintendo Switch
- Release: 23 December 2022
- Genres: Role-playing, adventure, sports
- Modes: Single-player, multiplayer

Sports Story is a 2022 video game developed and published by Sidebar Games for the Nintendo Switch. It is the sequel to the 2017 video game Golf Story and was released on 23 December 2022.

Originally announced in December 2019, Sports Story suffered multiple delays as the scope of the game became more ambitious. It received mixed reviews upon release; while its visuals were praised, critics faulted the game for its overuse of fetch quests, unfocused narrative, and numerous technical issues. Many regarded the game as inferior to Golf Story.

== Gameplay ==
Sports Story is a top-down adventure game following the protagonist of the original game investigating the suspicious activities of the PureStrike megacorporation and the Iron Dragons yakuza. Compared to Golf Story, which only featured gameplay revolving around the sport of golf, Sports Story features additional sports including tennis, association football, cricket, volleyball and BMX. The game uses mechanics based on these sports as part of its gameplay, which includes minigames, dungeon crawling and stealth segments. The game also features a fleshed out tennis academy storyline separate to the main story.

== Development and release ==
The game was announced on 10 December 2019 in a Nintendo Indie World showcase for an intended 2020 release. Similarly to the development of Golf Story, Sports Story was delayed a number of times as the scope of the game became more ambitious. It was ultimately released on 23 December 2022.

The initial release of the game contained a secret room (ostensibly a game development office) in which its occupants complained about an unnamed project's "troubled development", with some publications surmising that the comments referred to the protracted development of Sports Story itself. A later patch, while acknowledging the secret room, blocked player access to it and altered the occupants' dialogue to be more positive, albeit in a sarcastic manner.

== Reception ==
Reception

Aggregate score
Aggregator	Score
Metacritic	54/100

Review scores
Publication	Score
Game Informer	6.5/10
GameSpot	4/10
Nintendo Life	6/10

The game received "mixed or average reviews" according to media review aggregator website Metacritic, based on 13 critic reviews. Most critics found the game to be inferior to its predecessor.

Nintendo Life's mixed review praised Sports Story's writing and visuals, but they had issues with the game's numerous bugs and glitches, overuse of fetch quests, and its sometimes confusing quest structure. Siliconera criticized the lack of tutorials and its unfocused narrative, and felt parts of the game were "blatantly broken". GameSpot's negative review also criticised the fetch quests and the story, as well as the technical issues and the poor implementation of the new sports into the game, but found the golf to be the best part of the game. Vooks also felt the golf-focused parts of the game were still fun, and ultimately found the game to be "greater than the sum of its wobbly parts".
