= Cristina Vee =

American voice actress (born 1987)

- Vee at GalaxyCon Oklahoma City in 2026
- Born: Cristina Danielle Valenzuela; July 11, 1987 (age 39); Los Angeles, California, U.S.
- Education: California State University, Long Beach
- Occupations: Voice actress; singer
- Years active: 2005–present
- Website: cristinavee.com

Cristina Danielle Valenzuela (born July 11, 1987), known professionally as Cristina Vee, is an American voice actress and singer. She is known for her work in video games and English dubs of anime.

== Early life ==
Vee was born Cristina Danielle Valenzuela in Los Angeles on July 11, 1987. She has Lebanese, Indigenous Mexican (Tepehuán), and Spanish ancestry. She grew up in Norwalk, California, where she attended public school. One of her early interests was music, and she participated in the Norwalk All City band in middle school and high school. Her classmates called her "Sailor Moon Girl" due to her passion for acting and animation, and she co-founded John Glenn High School's anime club.

Vee studied theatre arts and graduated from California State University at Long Beach in 2007. She struggled with her mental health during college and later said, "Even though I loved studying theater and performing in shows, college was a really hard time for me. Because of depression and panic attacks, there were a couple of years where it was extremely hard for me to go to classes."

== Career ==
=== Anime ===
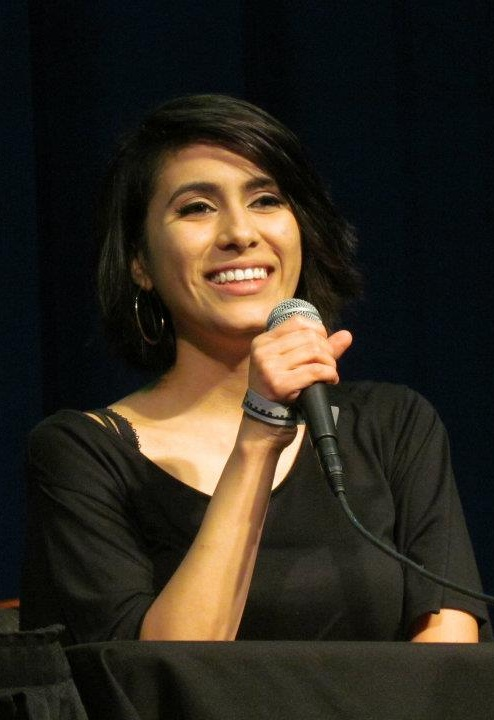
Vee in November 2012

Vee originally wanted to become an animator, but was inspired to become a voice actor at the age of 12 after watching Sailor Moon. By 16, she had accumulated four years of voice acting for amateur online projects. She attended Anime Expo multiple times as a fan and participated in their AX Idol voice-over contest. In 2004, she joined a voice-over panel where she controlled some of the equipment and was given a card from Wendee Lee to audition for several shows with Bang Zoom! Entertainment, including Samurai Champloo. Her first major role was Kanaria in Rozen Maiden. In 2008, she voiced the title character in Aika R-16: Virgin Mission, Louise in The Familiar of Zero, and Nanoha in Magical Girl Lyrical Nanoha. She portrayed the live-action Haruhi Suzumiya in the promotional videos for the second The Melancholy of Haruhi Suzumiya series, and performed as her at various events.

In 2011, she voiced the shy bassist Mio Akiyama in the school music comedy K-On! and Nagisa Saitō in the comedy Squid Girl. That year, she starred in the anime feature film Tekken: Blood Vengeance as Alisa Bosconovitch, attending American anime conventions with the Japanese writer Dai Satō to promote the film. In 2012, she voiced Homura Akemi in Puella Magi Madoka Magica. In 2013, she voiced Princess Yo in Nura: Rise of the Yokai Clan and Red Hood in the Ikki Tousen series. In 2014, she voiced Morgiana in Magi: The Labyrinth of Magic and the Honoka sisters in Knights of Sidonia. She was chosen to voice Sailor Mars in Viz's re-dub of Sailor Moon and the new Sailor Moon Crystal series. Vee described her voicing of Rei as different in Crystal because her character is more serious and regal compared to her character in the original series.

In 2015, she voiced Noel Vermillion in BlazBlue Alter Memory, Compa in Hyperdimension Neptunia: The Animation, and Hawk in The Seven Deadly Sins, the last of which was released as a Netflix original series. In 2016, she provided the voice of Killua Zoldyck in the Viz Media English dub of the 2011 anime adaptation of Hunter × Hunter. In 2021, she voiced Vivy in the Bang Zoom! Entertainment English dub of the original anime series Vivy: Fluorite Eye's Song. In 2025, she voiced Stocking in the Pixelogic Media dub of Panty & Stocking with Garterbelt, replacing Monica Rial from the Funimation dub.

=== Animation projects ===
Vee has been involved in several animation projects. In March 2012, she started a Kickstarter crowdfunding campaign to produce an animated music video in conjunction with Cybergraphix Animation and Studio APPP. The main character of the video, "Cristina Veecaloid", was designed by Skullgirls creative director Alex Ahad, Her character was later named Milky and was made into an iOS game called Veecaloid Pop released in 2015. In 2012, Vee was involved in voice casting and directing the Skullgirls video game and web series. The game was nominated at the 40th Annie Awards. In 2015, Vee began voicing Marinette Dupain-Cheng/Ladybug in the English dub of the animated series Miraculous: Tales of Ladybug & Cat Noir. The show premiered on Nickelodeon in December 2015, and has aired six seasons and five specials on Netflix and now Disney+ and Disney Channel. Executive producer Jared Wolfsen said that Vee and the other English dub voice actors brought a lot of energy to their characters, and that Vee herself is just like Ladybug – sweet and kind, and so fun to watch. In 2021 and 2024, Vee voiced Verosika Mayday in the animated web series Helluva Boss, starring in the episodes "Spring Broken", "Ozzie's" and "Apology Tour".

In June 2023, it was announced that she would voice Tere and Toñita in the animated series Primos, which premiered in July 2024 on Disney Channel.

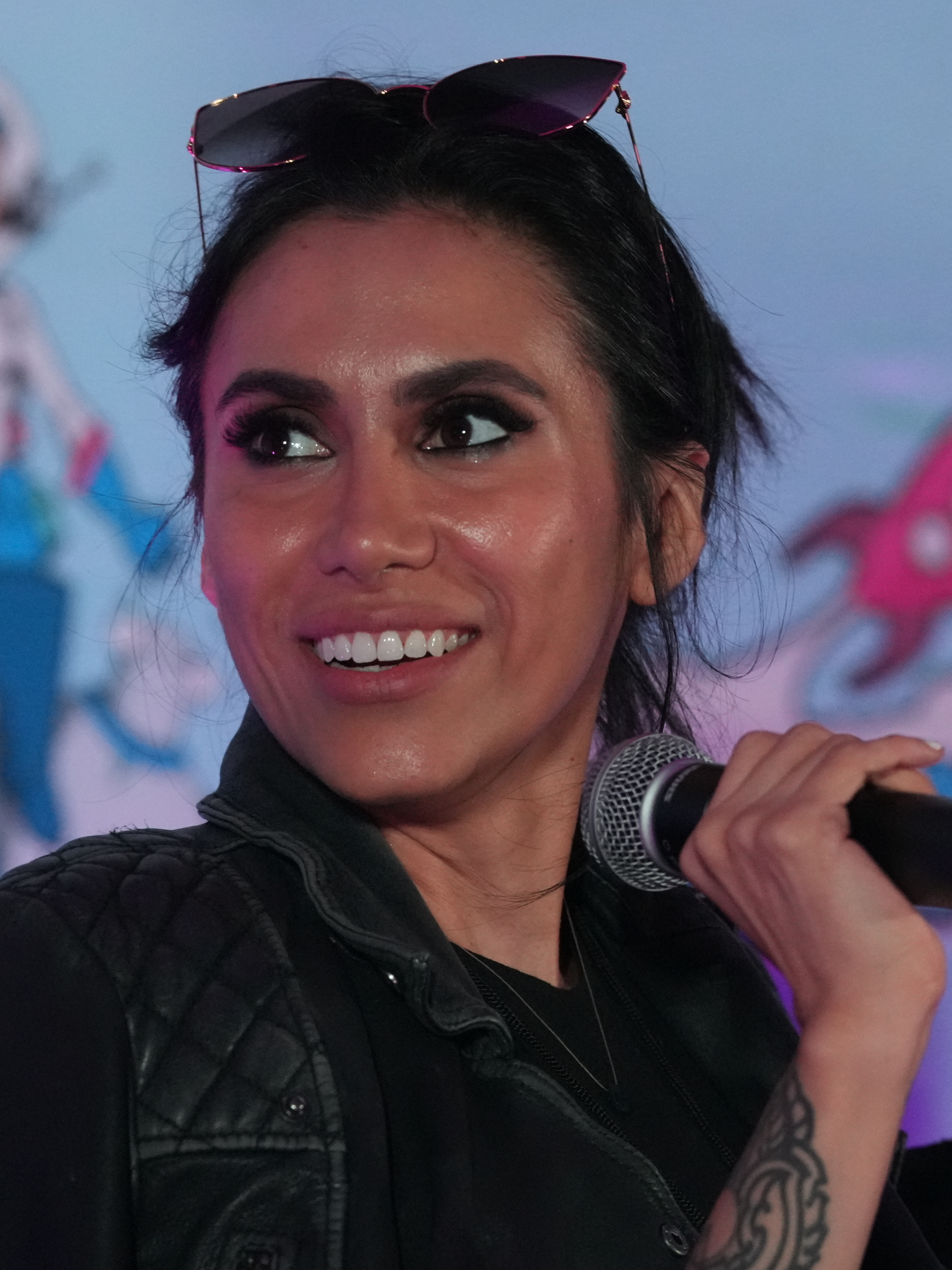
Vee in 2024

=== Video games, hosting, and other projects ===
Vee has been involved in voice-overs for video games, mostly with English localizations of Japanese titles produced by Atlus USA and NIS America. Some of her major roles are Noel Vermillion in BlazBlue, Velvet Crowe in Tales of Berseria, Riven the Exile in League of Legends, Four in Drakengard 3, Compa in Hyperdimension Neptunia, Ying in Paladins: Champions of the Realm, 13-Amp and 5-Volt in the WarioWare series, Marnie in Pokémon Masters EX, Tulin in The Legend of Zelda: Tears of the Kingdom, title character of the Shantae series and her arch-nemesis Risky Boots; Bennett and Xingqiu in Genshin Impact, The Dahlia in Honkai: Star Rail, and Hoshimi Miyabi in Zenless Zone Zero. She has directed and produced the voices for the video game Indivisible, which was crowdfunded with a total amount of $1.5 million on December 2, 2015.

In addition to performing live as Haruhi Suzumiya, Vee has appeared on screen on various web series, television shows and events. She was a host on Anime TV where she reviewed shows and interviewed people, and appeared on Funimation On Demand and Crunchyroll. She was a live-action host of IGN's IPL4 and IPL5 League of Legends video game tournaments in Las Vegas. She is a frequent guest at many anime conventions throughout the United States and worldwide.

=== Music ===
Vee is also a professional singer, and has performed the theme songs for two Shantae video games: "Dance Through the Danger" for 2016's Shantae: Half-Genie Hero and "Rise and Shine Shantae" for 2019's Shantae and the Seven Sirens. She also performed the theme song "Until I'm Broken" for the 2012 visual novel Loren the Amazon Princess. She performed multiple songs for the mobile gacha game Arknights: "Boiling Blood" in 2019, "ALIVE" in 2021, "Spark for Dream" in 2022 and "Water Quench" in 2023. In 2023, she sang the English dub ending theme for Digimon Adventure:, "KUYASHISAWA TANE".

Vee has uploaded several renditions of anime songs on YouTube. In 2015, she released an EP called Menagerie with DJ Bouche which was part of the Viewster's Omakase subscription service. She and YouTuber Nathan Sharp (NateWantsToBattle) released a cover of Charlie Puth's song "Attention" in August 2017. She also signed with an indie record label called Give Heart Records.

==== Covers ====
Vee recorded a cover of The Living Tombstone's song "Animal" with the 8-Bit Big Band in an arrangement by Charlie Rosen.

In May 2023, Vee recorded a cover of "Peaches" (from The Super Mario Bros. Movie) rewritten to be sung by Bowsette instead of Bowser.

In April 2024, Vee released a cover of "Whatever It Takes" from the Prime Video animated series Hazbin Hotel (set in the same fictional universe as Helluva Boss), featuring content creator, cosplayer and voice actress Sofia Gomez and musician Tre Watson.

== Personal life ==
Vee has lived in the Eagle Rock area of Los Angeles since 2012. She became engaged to fellow voice actor and musician Nathan Sharp in January 2018, but they separated eight months later.

In February 2024, an anonymous Twitter user falsely included Vee on a list of Zionist voice actors, prompting Vee and her fans to respond with proof of her support for Palestine and participation in anti-Zionist boycotts. However, by this time, she had already received death threats and soon deactivated her account. The anonymous user apologized but later deactivated their account due to backlash.

== Filmography ==
Preceded by Katie Griffin	Voice of Sailor Mars; 2014-present	Succeeded by Incumbent
