= Bennett (Genshin Impact) =

Fictional character in a video game

- Genshin Impact character
- Official artwork
- First game: Genshin Impact (2020)
- Voiced by: EN: Cristina Vee; ZH: Mu Xueting; JA: Ryōta Ōsaka; KO: Song Ha-rin

In-universe information
- Weapon: Sword
- Home: Mondstadt (vision); Natlan (ancestry)
- Element: Pyro
- Birthday: February 29

Bennett (Chinese: 班尼特; pinyin: Bānnítè) is a character in the video game Genshin Impact, developed by miHoYo. He was one of the first playable characters released in the game. In the lore, he is an adventurer from the country of Mondstadt with notoriously bad luck. He was received positively by critics, who praised him for his kind personality and ability to help the player in combat.

== Design and voice acting ==
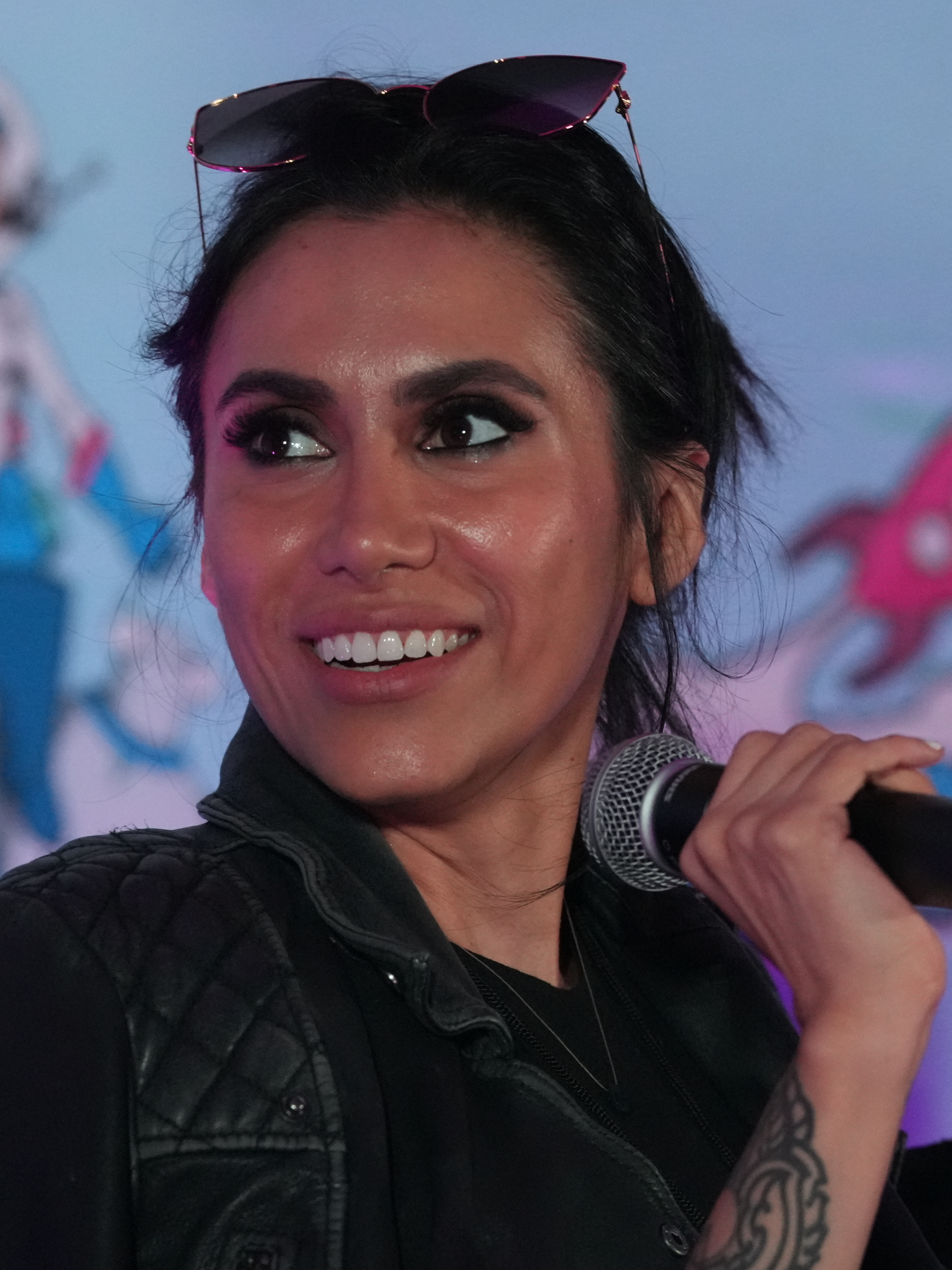
Cristina Vee, Bennett's English voice actress, in 2024

In terms of physical appearance, Bennett has messy light-blond hair, green eyes, and a bandage on his nose. His clothing is a mix of beige, brown and red, which gives him the appearance of an adventurer. Bennett is voiced in English by Cristina Vee, in Chinese by Mu Xueting, in Japanese by Ryōta Ōsaka, and in Korean by Song Ha-rim. In an interview, Ōsaka described the character as somewhat mischievous with very poor luck, saying that misfortune seems to follow him constantly, which made Ōsaka feel sorry for Bennett. In terms of personality, Ōsaka said that he, like Bennett, is an optimist who can quickly overcome worries and feel fine again the next day. However, he noted that the difference between them is that Bennett acts more out of confidence than caution. Song, meanwhile, recalled that when she first auditioned, the character sample she received portrayed a somewhat arrogant and forceful figure, which differed greatly from the innocence and optimism Bennett later exhibited. Because of this, she was initially worried about whether the sample really matched Bennett's actual feel. As the story continued to be updated, Song gradually came to understand the more delicate side of Bennett's personality; at times, Bennett becomes cautious because he worries about causing others trouble. However, he never gives up hope and continues to strive forward. She also said that after watching the version 5.8 story in which Bennett reunites with the spirits of his biological parents, she felt that Bennett, even at a moment where he longed for their love, was still thinking of the dads who raised him and of his friends, making him a sensible child who knows how to consider others. When recording a line in which Bennett tells his mother he loves her, she became so emotionally invested in the performance that she broke down crying, even affecting her vocal control; it became an unforgettable moment in Song's career as a voice actress.

== Appearances ==
Bennett's biological parents were members of an adventuring team known as the Flintblades. During an accident, the Flintblades entered a dangerous domain and were attacked by monsters from the antagonistic Abyss; there were no survivors. When Bennett was on the verge of death in a hellish, desperate place, an elderly adventurer who had ventured deep into the area discovered him, hid him in his arms, and carried him away. But before the old man could personally recount what had happened, he died from his severe injuries. After that, two older adventurers from the Adventurer's Guild in Mondstadt jointly adopted the child, named him Bennett, and raised him as one of their own. Bennett, sensible from a young age, affectionately called them both "dad", and while continuing his adventures, carefully looked after his foster parents. Bennett's life is filled with all kinds of bad luck. He once formed a party called "Benny's Adventure Team", but his own misfortune scared off all of his potential teammates, eventually leaving him alone. During one adventure, he was gravely injured and his life was in danger, but the arrival of his Vision (Note: A Vision is a magical device used to manipulate the elements.) healed his wounds. Despite such a troubled fate, Bennett never complains. His birthday is February 29, meaning he only has the chance to celebrate on the actual date once every four years. Because of this, his foster parents and the Adventurer's Guild hold celebrations for him on February 28, so that he will not feel disappointed.

In the Story Quest "Sunspray Summer Resort", the protagonist Traveler is invited to the Easybreeze Holiday Resort in Natlan, where they encounter Bennett and a creature called an Asha that follows him around. Bennett unusually experiences good luck here, while also exploring the facilities and befriending the locals. After they encounter monsters from the Abyss, the group unexpectedly discovers an old notebook with the name "Flintblades" in it, which leaves Bennett deep in thought. The next day, all of their photographs become blurry, with only a group photo of the Flintblades appearing clearly, and the Asha suddenly runs off. The group follows it to the entrance of a Domain. Inside said Domain, the environment is harsh, and Bennett becomes separated from the others. Eventually, just as he loses consciousness, his companions find him, with two Ashas guarding him by his side. Using his power as the Anemo Archon, Venti saves Bennett and also allows everyone to see the remaining memories of the Flintblades. They learn that Bennett was the very infant whom the adventure team desperately wished to save before dying. After waking up, Bennett reunites with the spirits of his birth parents and learns that he is in fact a native to Natlan, and that his name means "blessed one". His years of bad luck were caused by his connection to Natlan's Ley Lines being severed while he was still very young. At the opening ceremony for the resort, Bennett speaks with his parents' spirits by the sea. They express their unconditional love for him and call him their "lucky star" forever. At sunrise, he holds back his tears as he bids them farewell, vowing to become the greatest adventurer. At the end of his vacation, Bennett tells everyone that he has already met with the Pyro Archon Mavuika and learned that the domain was the Mare Jivari mimicked by the Abyss, and that it has now dispersed. In the end, he decides to return to Mondstadt, because even if he may once again face misfortune, the warmth he gained from being in Natlan was enough for him to move forward calmly.

=== Gameplay ===
Bennett is a four-star Pyro damage dealer who uses a sword in combat. He primarily functions in a support role. After casting his Elemental Burst, he summons a field which gives them an attack boost and heals them. After unlocking his sixth Constellation, characters who use swords, claymores, or polearms inside the field gain a Pyro damage bonus, while their weapons are also infused with Pyro.

== Promotion ==
Bennett was first made playable upon the game's release in September 2020. His mysterious origins are an important piece of foreshadowing in the game. On July 18, 2025, the developers first revealed the form of Mare Jivari, an important in-game location, as that of a red storm; there was a pattern similar in shape to Bennett's Constellation floating in the sky in that area. The production team hinted that this was foreshadowing, confirming a long-standing speculation that Bennett was originally from Natlan. Version 5.8 revealed Bennett's experiences as an infant, and also introduced a new outfit for him.

== Reception ==
As early as September 2020, Bennett's background and origins had already caused discussion among players. Iansan, a character from Natlan that appeared in one of the game's trailers, was noticed by players to have physical similarities with Bennett. Such a strong resemblance is rare within the game's character designs, sparking speculation that Bennett was from Natlan which ultimately was revealed to be true. Before version 5.8 confirmed this, Screen Rant writer Bruno Yonezawa had speculated that Bennett may have been one of the heroes Mavuika had intended to recruit in the story, and reasoned that his bad luck stemmed from him leaving Natlan because doing so results in losing protection from the Wayob. He also speculated that Bennett might be the reincarnation of an ancient Natlanese sage that disappeared in the Mare Jivari, the same place where Bennett was found. Writer Holly Alice of Pocket Tactics revealed that she had long supported the theory that Bennett was born there, and outlined the in-game clues which supported this. She noted that Bennett had once used the Mare Jivari as the theme of a poem during Windblume, and that the Natlan region contains many broken-ring design elements similar to Bennett's Constellation. She also connected this to Natlan's greater lore; characters from Natlan were generally not able to leave the nation prior to the conclusion of that region's Archon Quest without suffering negative side effects, and Holly Alice theorized that bad luck may be included in this. She expressed hope that version 5.8 would reveal more lore about Bennett and explain more about his past and the Mare Jivari.

=== Characterization ===
In terms of character appeal, Siliconera writer Jenni Lada argued that Bennett is one of the four-star characters in the game who feels the most like a protagonist: the world treats him harshly, but he still responds with cheerfulness, integrity, and eagerness to help others. She says this heroic quality gives him charm and makes him feel as if he stepped out of a role-playing game (RPG), turning him into the player's "virtual best friend". She also said that, within the game world, people are very much aware that he is a magnet for disaster but love him nonetheless; senior Adventurer's Guild members, his dads, and even people such as Barbara (Mondstadt's teen idol) genuinely care about him. She further remarked that precisely because Bennett so strongly resembles a standard RPG protagonist, the fact that he does not receive protagonist-level story treatment in Genshin Impact is itself an ironic reflection of the premise of his bad luck.

Jessica Clark Dillon, writing for TheGamer, argued that Bennett's innocence and kindness are second only to that of the aforementioned Barbara. Although he is regarded as the unluckiest person in Teyvat, and Mondstadt's residents blame many accidents on him, he is never defeated by misfortune and always moves forward with a smile. This optimism, maintained despite a cruel fate and poor reputation, makes him an impressive character to her. Dillon particularly emphasized that Bennett's motivation for adventuring is not wealth or treasure, but simply a desire to help others and enjoy the scenery, reflecting his pure, innocent and selfless nature. In addition, his actions toward those around him, such as believing the exaggerated claims by Fischl about being from another world, for instance, further demonstrate his almost childlike kindness.

In an event for version 1.4, Bennett and Razor were trapped together, during which they discussed a love poem related to the "Windblume", and became friends after being rescued. Yahoo News commentator Yan Ku, writing for International Friendship Day, praised several sincere friendships in the game and revealed that theirs was her favorite, which she considered heartwarming. She specifically noted that Razor regards Bennett as his "Lupical" or family, and teaches him how to communicate with the local wolf pack, while Bennett often shares his love of meat with Razor and cooks for him. Dillon analyzed that the two were able to become friends partly because Razor has no fear of Bennett's bad luck, and partly because both are adopted orphans whose similar circumstances allow them to understand and appreciate each other.

Sisi Jiang of Kotaku, in an overview of scenes in Genshin Impact which allow for interpretations beyond friendship, also specifically mentioned Bennett and Razor's interactions, pointing out that the poem he wrote carries an emotional intensity that was difficult to dismiss lightly as platonic friendship, making it one of the game's most representative passages touching on same-sex emotional interpretation. Game Rant writer Adrian Iglesias approached the subject from another angle, writing that Bennett's use of the plural "dads" in his birthday message reveals his non-traditional family background, in which he was raised collectively by several older men from the Adventurer's Guild. This setup may resonate with some players, especially those from the LGBTQ community or non-nuclear families, showing that although Genshin Impact has not explicitly created LGBT characters, Bennett's background subtly echoes certain shared feelings within said community and reflects the game's inclusiveness toward its diverse fanbase.

=== Gameplay ===
In terms of gameplay, INSIDE writer Tea Pudding noted that Bennett is widely recognized by players as a highly powerful four-star support character. The attack boost provided by his Elemental Burst fundamentally changed the game's meta, making him a core component of almost any team pursuing maximum damage. Whether in difficult endgame challenges or other tests, Tea Pudding argues that Bennett is an irreplaceable presence on a team. Inverse writer Sean Martin likewise commented that, ever since the game's launch, Bennett has continued to provide buffs to teams through his Elemental Burst. The value he brings to players may surpass that of any main DPS character, and he remains one of the most convenient supports in the game. However, Yonezawa wrote that after Bennett unlocks his sixth Constellation, although it can benefit some teams, its Pyro infusion overrides some characters' elements, preventing most Elemental Reactions from occurring. For teams that rely on these, this greatly weakens Bennett's versatility and practical effectiveness. For that reason, he advised players to think carefully before deciding whether to activate Bennett's sixth Constellation.
