= Shantae and the Seven Sirens =

2019 video game

- Developer: WayForward
- Publishers: WayForward; Crunchyroll (mobile)
- Director: Matt Bozon
- Producers: Mo Sabawi; Glenn Seidel
- Designer: Matt Bozon
- Programmer: Walter Hecht
- Artist: Chris Drysdale
- Writer: Matt Bozon
- Composers: Kentaro Sakamoto; Mark Sparling; Maddie Lim; Gavin Allen
- Series: Shantae
- Platforms: Android; iOS; macOS; Nintendo Switch; PlayStation 4; PlayStation 5; Windows; Xbox One
- Release: iOS; September 19, 2019; macOS; October 7, 2019; PS4, Windows, Xbox One; May 28, 2020; Nintendo Switch; NA: May 28, 2020; EU: June 4, 2020; PlayStation 5; March 22, 2022; Android; November 20, 2024
- Genres: Platform, Metroidvania
- Mode: Single-player

Shantae and the Seven Sirens is a 2019 platform game by WayForward. It is the fifth game in the Shantae series, following Shantae: Half-Genie Hero (2016). The game follows half-genie Shantae on the tropical Paradise Island, which she must explore to rescue other half-genies kidnapped by the eponymous Seven Sirens. The game was released via Apple Arcade for iOS (including versions for iPhone, iPad and Apple TV) in September 2019, for macOS in October 2019, for Nintendo Switch, PlayStation 4, Windows, and Xbox One in May 2020, and for PlayStation 5 in March 2022. The game was released on Android and re-released on iOS by Crunchyroll as part of its Games Vault offerings in November 2024.

== Gameplay ==
Seven Sirens returns to the metroidvania style of the first three entries in the series, and follows the half-genie Shantae as she explores an interconnected world. During her journey, Shantae visits towns with non-player characters to interact with, and traverses dungeon-style labyrinths containing new abilities to unlock and bosses to defeat. Shantae retains her ability to transform into other creatures, now utilized via an ability called "fusion magic" that allows her to instantly transform and use a creature's ability with a button press instead of having to select it like in past games, functioning similarly to the Pirate Gear in Pirate's Curse. Additional special abilities can be performed by dancing, such as revealing hidden objects or healing wilted plants. Defeated enemies will sometimes drop collectible Monster Cards bearing their image. By finding a certain number of a given card, Shantae can equip it to augment her abilities, providing bonuses such as increased movement speed or magic automatically refilling over time. Up to three cards can be equipped at once, with a total of 50 different cards to collect. Like other games in the series, completing the story awards the player with bonus artwork based on their final time and completion percentage. A New Game Plus mode allows the player to replay the game with higher magic but lower defense.

A free update to the game in November 2021 added four alternate game modes: "Definitive Mode", which features more challenging rebalanced difficulty; "Beginner Mode", which lowers the difficulty such that the player cannot lose; "Full Deck Mode", which grants the player all 50 Monster Cards from the beginning of the game; and "Rule Breaker Mode", which removes the limit on how many cards can be equipped at once.

== Plot ==
The half-genie Shantae and her friends are invited to Paradise Island by the mayor of Arena Town, where a Half-Genie Festival is being held. There, she meets and befriends fellow half-genies Plink, Vera, Zapple, Harmony, and Fillin. However, during a performance at the festival, the other half-genies are kidnapped. Determined to uncover the reason for their disappearance, Shantae begins exploring the sunken city beneath the island in search of the other half-genies. While searching, she encounters her longtime arch-nemesis Risky Boots. Shantae accuses her of the kidnapping, but Risky refutes her, stating that she is only here to claim a mysterious treasure said to reside beneath the island, and that the others were taken by the true rulers of the island, the Seven Sirens. Shantae continues to explore beneath the island, entering four of the sirens' lairs and defeating the sirens within. She manages to rescue four of the missing half-genies, each of which transfers their magical ability to Shantae to help strengthen her against the sirens.

While rescuing Harmony, Shantae discovers that Fillin is actually her friend Rottytops. Shantae enters an underground bunker to find her, but inadvertently activates a control panel, realizing that the sunken city is both a giant airship and the treasure that Risky Boots was after. She ventures further inside and rescues Rottytops, who admits she hid in Shantae's luggage and disguised herself after Shantae didn't invite her along, while Shantae explains she only left her out because Rottytops was already hidden and she couldn't find her. As Shantae defeats the fifth siren and they escape, Risky activates the ship and takes off, preparing to activate the ship's weapons and destroy the island.

Shantae is teleported aboard the ship by the friendly sixth siren, Lobster Siren, but is imprisoned by the Mayor, revealed to have been Risky all along. The sirens' elderly leader, Empress Siren, appears and explains she was defeated by Harmony's mother years ago, who placed a spell on her so she could only feed on the life force of genies and not mortals, causing her to starve. The Empress made a deal with Risky, offering the ship in exchange for bringing her five half-genies whose life force she could use to break the spell, restoring her and allowing her to absorb mortal life force again. However, she betrays Risky and steals her life force, restoring her youth, and announces her plan to drain the life force from all creatures to make herself immortal. Shantae frees herself and defeats the Empress, who realizes her restoration was incomplete due to Rottytops not being an actual half-genie. Shantae restores the other half-genies' magic as they take back their stolen life force, destroying the Empress.

As the ship begins to crash from the damage sustained, the others evacuate while Shantae remains behind to rescue Risky Boots, carrying her back to shore. Risky admits she told the Empress Siren Shantae's magic was tainted so she wouldn't be drained, allowing her to defeat the Empress if she tried to betray Risky. As Risky departs, Shantae and the other half-genies decide to resume the festival, and Lobster Siren offers to help rebuild the island. As Shantae and her friends prepare to depart after the festival, Harmony gives her a scrapbook made by the Guardian Genies filled with messages left for their half-genie daughters, including some written by Shantae's mother.

== Development ==
Shantae and the Seven Sirens took roughly 18 months to develop, the shortest development cycle of any game in the series according to director Matt Bozon. Bozon had hoped to integrate instant transformations into the series' gameplay since the release of the original Shantae in 2002, rather than tie it to the dance mechanic seen in previous releases. The game's Monster Card system was inspired by the similar system used in Castlevania: Aria of Sorrow. The decision to launch the game on the then-upcoming Apple Arcade was born from connections made between WayForward and Apple during the development of Watch Quest for the Apple Watch.

On March 25, 2019, WayForward revealed the game under the working title Shantae 5, and stated it would be released on multiple platforms, including the newly-announced Apple Arcade service, later that same year. The official title and first gameplay details were confirmed the following August. Seven Sirens features 2D hand-painted artwork designed for 4K resolution devices, along with animated cutscenes. The game's opening sequence was animated by Studio Trigger and features an original song, "Rise and Shine Shantae", with vocals by Shantae voice actress Cristina Vee.

== Release ==
The first part of the game was released for iOS on September 19, 2019 as a launch title of the Apple Arcade subscription service; the remainder of the game was added via an update on March 28, 2020. The Apple Arcade version later released on iPadOS and tvOS on September 30, 2019, and on macOS on October 7, 2019. The console and Windows versions of the game were released on May 28, 2020, excluding the European Nintendo Switch version, which was delayed by one week. The game received four new game modes, as well as several quality of life changes, via an update to all versions on November 30, 2021. A PlayStation 5 version was released on March 22, 2022, with the additions of DualSense audio and Activity functionality.

== Reception ==
Reception

Aggregate score
Aggregator	Score
Metacritic	PC: 80/100; PS4: 71/100; XONE: 75/100; NS: 79/100

Review scores
Publication	Score
Destructoid	6/10
Nintendo Life	9/10
Nintendo World Report	8.5/10

Shantae and the Seven Sirens received "generally favorable" reviews, according to review aggregator Metacritic.
