= Shantae and the Pirate's Curse =

2014 video game

- Developer: WayForward Technologies (Note: Additional work by Inti Creates)
- Publisher: WayForward Technologies (Note: Rising Star Games published the retail version on Nintendo 3DS. Oizumi Amuzio Inc. published the retail versions on Nintendo Switch in Japan.)
- Director: Matt Bozon
- Producer: Christopher Shanley
- Designer: Kyle Bardiau
- Programmer: Larry Holdaway
- Artists: Henk Nieborg; Chris Drysdale
- Writer: Matt Bozon
- Composer: Jake Kaufman
- Series: Shantae
- Engine: EngineBlack
- Platforms: Nintendo 3DS; Wii U; Microsoft Windows; Amazon Fire TV; Xbox One; PlayStation 4; Nintendo Switch; PlayStation 5
- Release: October 23, 2014: Nintendo 3DS; NA: October 23, 2014; PAL: February 5, 2015; JP: November 19, 2015 Wii U; NA: December 25, 2014; PAL: February 5, 2015; JP: September 7, 2016 Microsoft Windows; WW: April 23, 2015 Amazon Fire TV; WW: October 22, 2015 Xbox One; WW: March 16, 2016 PlayStation 4; NA: April 19, 2016; PAL: April 20, 2016; JP: September 7, 2016 Nintendo Switch; WW: March 20, 2018; JP: October 25, 2018 Amazon Luna; US: October 20, 2020 PlayStation 5; WW: September 27, 2022
- Genres: Platform, Metroidvania
- Mode: Single-player

Shantae and the Pirate's Curse is a 2014 platform video game developed and published by WayForward Technologies for the Nintendo 3DS and the Wii U. It is the third game in the Shantae series, following Shantae: Risky's Revenge (2010), and the first to be developed for a home console. The game follows the adventures of the eponymous half-genie Shantae as she once again has to save Sequin Land from a new foe, the Pirate Master, with help from her nemesis Risky Boots.

It was released in North America on the 3DS eShop on October 23, 2014, and on the Wii U eShop on December 25, 2014, and in PAL regions on both platforms on February 5, 2015. The game was later ported to PlayStation 4, PlayStation 5, Xbox One, Microsoft Windows, Amazon Fire TV, Nintendo Switch, and Amazon Luna.

The title features a new soundtrack by Jake Kaufman. It received generally favorable reviews for its level design, art direction, and writing. It was listed in the Top 10 of the Club Nintendo 2014 survey of the fans' favorite games and was a nominee for best 3DS game and best platformer by IGN.

== Gameplay ==
Like its predecessors, Shantae and the Pirate's Curse casts players in the role of Shantae the half-genie, who can attack enemies using her hair. Having lost her genie powers in the previous game, Shantae now makes use of various pirate items that the player obtains during the course of the game. These include a pistol that can be used to shoot enemies and switches from afar, a hat that can be used to glide through the air and ride on gusts of wind, a scimitar that can break blocks using a downwards thrust, boots that send Shantae into a charging dash that can break through certain walls, and a cannon that can be used to perform additional jumps in mid-air. Players can also make use of various items, such as damaging pike balls or health restoring potions. These items, as well as upgrades to Shantae's hair attack and pirate items, can be purchased using gems obtained from enemies and breakable objects. In place of transformation dances, Shantae can use a genie lamp to suck up nearby gems, as well as carry dark magic and other gaseous objects like smells.

Unlike the fully interconnected world of its predecessors, the world of Pirate's Curse is spread across multiple islands that Shantae can travel to via Risky Boots' pirate ship. These islands each require Shantae to gain access to a Den of Evil, where one of the pirate items can be found, and defeat a boss in order to gain a map to the next island. Players will often be required to fulfill certain quests in order to progress, such as finding an item on one island and giving it to someone on another. Hidden across the various islands are twenty cursed Cacklebats, which the player must defeat and extract Dark Magic from in order to obtain the game's best ending. Up to 32 Heart Squids can also be collected, which can be exchanged to increase Shantae's maximum health. Clearing the game unlocks Pirate Mode, which gives Shantae all of her pirate items from the start to allow the player to perform speedruns. Additional bonus artwork is unlocked based on players' final time and completion percentage upon clearing the game. The Nintendo 3DS western physical release and Nintendo Switch version feature an exclusive minigame, "Super Shantae NAB!", based on a Shantae-themed minigame featured in WarioWare D.I.Y., which can be played to earn additional gems.

== Plot ==
Shantae has been adjusting to life as a human after losing her genie powers. (Note: As depicted in Shantae: Risky's Revenge (2010)) One morning, Shantae awakes to the sound of cannon fire. As Shantae rushes out to investigate, her friends Sky and Bolo tell her that their hometown of Scuttle Town is being taken over by the Ammo Baron, who, after a brief scuffle, reveals that he bought the town from Mayor Scuttlebutt and is legally now its new mayor. Ammo Baron places Shantae under lockdown pending further punishment. Defeated and despondent, Shantae returns home, where she is confronted by her nemesis, the pirate Risky Boots. Risky accuses Shantae of robbing her, as her henchmen and items have suddenly gone missing. The two discover that Dark Magic has overtaken Risky's Tinkerbats, turning them into evil Cacklebats. Risky deduces that the Pirate Master, a powerful evil tyrant and her former captain who was sealed away long ago by Sequin Land's genies, is trying to use the Dark Magic to revive himself. Determined to stop his revival at all costs, Risky forms a reluctant alliance with Shantae to destroy the dens of evil giving him power, recover Risky's lost pirate items, and retrieve the Dark Magic inhabiting the Cacklebats. Along the way, Shantae's friend Rottytops reconciles with her for her unwitting role in Shantae losing her magic, and Risky reveals that the Dark Magic is actually Shantae's genie magic, which was corrupted and scattered across Sequin Land rather than destroyed.

After Shantae destroys all of the evil dens, Risky attempts to destroy the Pirate Master's grave, but is kidnapped by the revived Pirate Master. Shantae gives chase back to Scuttle Town, and confronts the Pirate Master in the Sequin Land palace. If Shantae does not collect all the Dark Magic before confronting the Pirate Master, he escapes and Risky retakes her equipment from Shantae, revealing the items' curse which will eventually overtake her. Risky leaves to confront the Pirate Master alone, while Shantae vows to retrieve all of her missing magic.

If Shantae collected all the Dark Magic, the Pirate Master steals the pirate items and forces Shantae to give up the Dark Magic she had collected in order to save Risky. To her surprise, she discovers that the magic has turned back into Light Magic, allowing Shantae to once again become a half-genie and defeat the Pirate Master with Risky's help, releasing his curse from Risky's Tinkerbats and weapons. With peace returned to Sequin Land, Shantae and Risky develop a mutual respect and understanding of one another, though Risky admits that she will never be one of the good guys. Later, Shantae uses her powers to return Scuttle Town's ownership and drive the Ammo Baron out of town, while Risky returns to her life of piracy, preparing for when their paths cross again.

== Development ==
The game was first announced in the November 2012 edition of Nintendo Power. On May 29, 2014, WayForward Technologies announced that more info about the game would be revealed at E3 2014. Just prior to Nintendo's own E3 2014 presentation, WayForward revealed to Nintendo Life that an HD variant of Shantae and the Pirate's Curse was coming to Wii U.

Limited Run Games printed 6,000 physical copies of the PlayStation 4 version, which were released on their website on October 28, 2016. They also released physical copies on Nintendo Switch on December 7, 2018, including a Collector's Edition.

A Google Stadia port was announced on May 14, 2021, and was scheduled to be released that summer, but was postponed to an unknown date, and was eventually cancelled due to the service's closure on January 18, 2023.

The game was released for Amazon Luna on October 20, 2022. A PlayStation 5 port was announced on June 14, 2021, and later released on September 27, 2022.

== Reception ==
=== Commercial performance ===
The game was commercially successful, being featured in the best-sellers for the Nintendo 3DS. In 2018, the Limited Run Games Collector's Edition for the game on Nintendo Switch sold out in a few minutes.

=== Critical reception ===
Reception

Aggregate score
Aggregator	Score
Metacritic	(3DS) 82/100 (Wii U) 85/100 (XONE) 79/100 (PS4) 75/100 (NS) 86/100

Review scores
Publication	Score
Destructoid	7.5/10
Famitsu	32/40
Game Informer	7/10
Hardcore Gamer	4.5/5
IGN	8.5/10
Pocket Gamer	9/10

Like its predecessors, Shantae and the Pirate's Curse was met with "generally favorable reviews", according to review aggregator Metacritic, with scores of 82/100 (3DS) and 85/100 (Wii U). Hardcore Gamer gave the game a 4.5 out of 5, saying "Shantae and the Pirate's Curse is another exemplary entry in a short but long-lived line of exploration-driven platformers. The gameplay is fun, varied and challenging, and will test the skills of even the most hardcore platforming fans." Destructoid enjoyed the moment-to-moment platforming and combat mechanics, the dungeons' "interesting" layouts and hard-to-find secret areas, and the "funny" narrative, but lamented the replacement of a "giant, singular open world" like in Risky's Revenge with a "collective of islands" that were too small and found the removal of the previous game's quick travel mechanic made "getting from place to place ... a hassle." Pocket Gamer thought Pirate's Curse was "a joy to play," with "masterful spritework" and a high-quality soundtrack. Game Informer felt that the game was let down by "pesky backtracking" with "annoyingly ambiguous" places to use unlocked pirate gear after returning to previously explored areas, but found that "all of Shantae's pirate platforming abilities gel together well during the latter stages," with a few moments of "old-school platforming at its best." With the game aided by "detailed, expressive sprites" and environments "bright and full of life", IGN found that Pirate's Curse "[stood] out from the glut of retro-inspired platformers", praising the world's division into "distinct-feeling" islands whose "smaller, more focused approach" kept the reviewer engaged, the occasional "inane, hilarious" puzzle scenario, and the "consistently funny" dialogue, but was annoyed by numerous enemies that constantly respawned while backtracking throughout the islands.

The game was among the Top 10 of the 2014 survey of Club Nintendo's Fan Faves, voted by over 682,000 people.

=== Accolades ===
List of awards and nominations
Year	Awards	Category	Result	Ref.
2015	IGN's Best of 2014	Best 3DS Game	Nominated	
2015	IGN's Best of 2014	Best Platformer	Nominated	
