= Limited Run Games =

American video game distributor

Limited Run Games, Inc.
- Type: Subsidiary
- Industry: Video games
- Founded: October 2015; 11 years ago in Cary, North Carolina, US
- Founders: Josh Fairhurst; Douglas Bogart
- Headquarters: Apex, North Carolina, US
- Number of employees: 69 (2022)
- Parent: Mighty Rabbit Studios (2015–2017); Embracer Freemode (2022–present)
- Divisions: Press Run
- Subsidiaries: Limited Run Retail, LLC; SuperDeluxe Games (40%)
- Website: limitedrungames.com

Limited Run Games, Inc. is an American video game distributor based in Apex, North Carolina. The company predominantly sells limited quantities of physical video game copies via its website and select retail stores. Josh Fairhurst and Douglas Bogart founded Limited Run Games in October 2015 after Fairhurst wanted to preserve the digitally released games developed by his studio, Mighty Rabbit Studios, on physical media. The company's first release, Breach & Clear for the PlayStation Vita, was quickly sold out and followed up with Saturday Morning RPG. Oddworld Inhabitants approached the company to release a physical version of Oddworld: New 'n' Tasty!, which led Limited Run Games to release games by other developers. Following major expansion between 2018 and 2022, including branching out into publishing and retrogaming, the company was acquired by Embracer Group through its Embracer Freemode operative group in September 2022.

== History ==
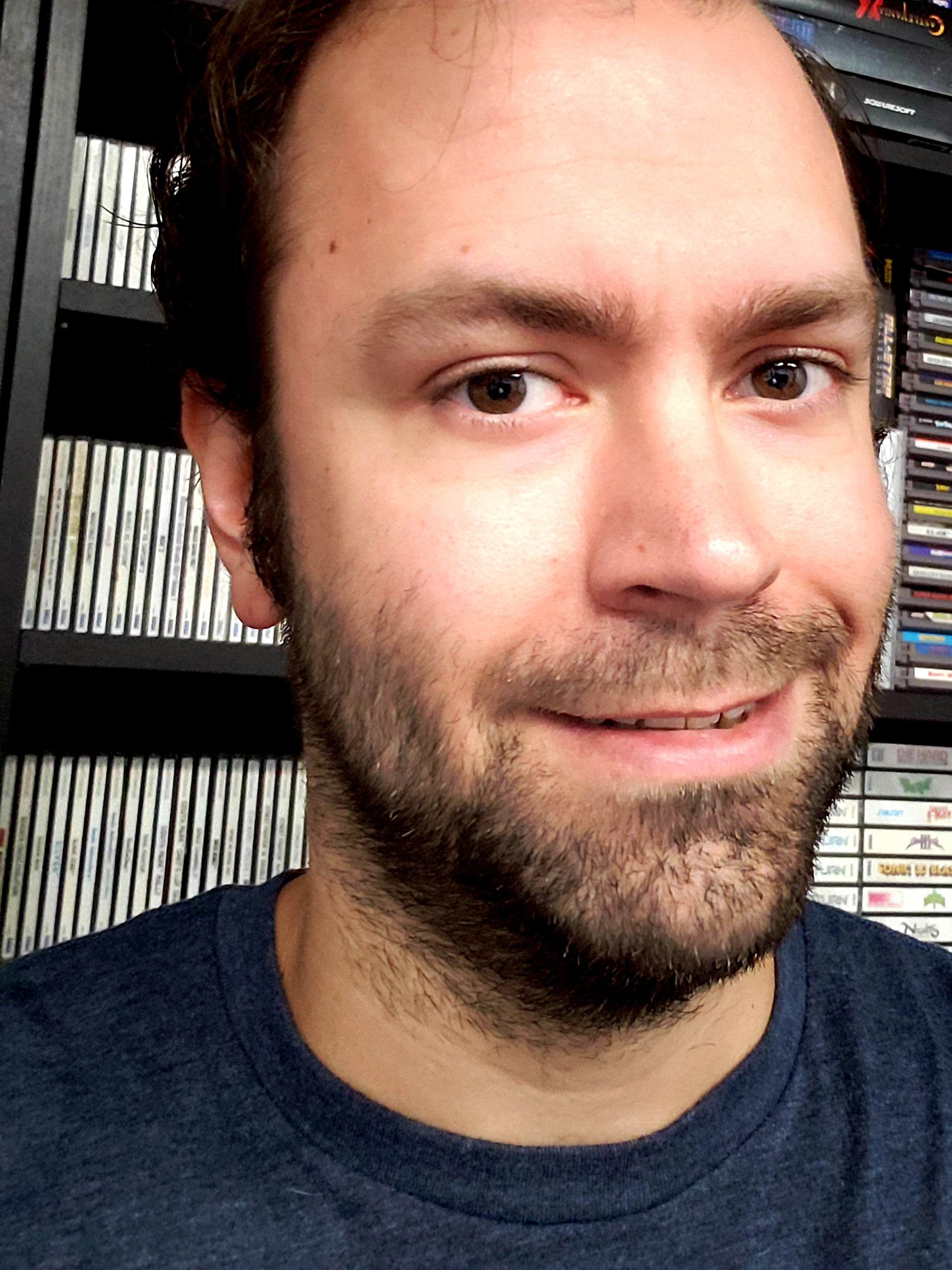
Josh Fairhurst (pictured in 2019) co-founded Limited Run Games in 2015 and served as its chief executive officer until 2025.

=== Formation and early years (2015–2017) ===
Limited Run Games was launched in October 2015 by chief executive officer (CEO) Josh Fairhurst and chief operating officer Douglas Bogart. They had known each other since the sixth grade and Bogart was eventually hired by Fairhurst's video game development studio, Mighty Rabbit Studios, as a tester. As the studio's games were only released digitally, Fairhurst believed that they would become inaccessible once digital storefronts shut down. After noticing the success of Retro City Rampage's physical releases, he conceived Limited Run Games with the intent of preserving his studio's games by releasing them on physical media. At the same time, Mighty Rabbit Studios had run out of contract work and, lacking funding, was close to shutting down. Fairhurst had temporarily taken up a teaching position at a community college and hoped that opening Limited Run Games would alleviate the company's struggles. After taking out a US$85,000 line of credit, Fairhurst worked on establishing Limited Run Games for eight months, contacting twelve different parties to make the necessary arrangements. Sony, the producer of the PlayStation line of consoles, agreed to lower the minimum order quantity for the prospective first release, Breach & Clear for the PlayStation Vita, to 1,500, which was more financially feasible. He then brought in Bogart to market such a release and build up anticipation.

Fairhurst and Bogart established Limited Run Games as a division of Mighty Rabbit Studios, then based in Cary, North Carolina. The company released Breach & Clear alongside the launch of its website on October 29, 2015. Limited Run Games sought to test the market response with this release, and it sold out in 108 minutes. The company consequently followed up Breach & Clear with Saturday Morning RPG, also developed by Mighty Rabbit Studios. During this time, the company worked with Fairhurst and Bogart as its only employees. Distribution was handled from Mighty Rabbit Studios's offices, with some of the studio's staffers helping to prepare shipments. Forgoing retail outlets allowed Limited Run Games to avoid applying for expensive content ratings from the Entertainment Software Rating Board (ESRB) for each release.

The first third-party game released by Limited Run Games was Oddworld: New 'n' Tasty!. Oddworld Inhabitants, the game's publisher, had reached out to the company for the release, which drove it to release more games from external partners. Limited Run Games settled on producing these games fully at its own cost and then retaining 30% of the gross income, with Bogart noting a lower cut would be unsustainable. With the release of Futuridium EP Deluxe in 2016, Limited Run Games switched to using a distribution center to handle shipments. The company launched 46 games in 2016. Originally, Limited Run Games produced only a fixed number of copies, which it later replaced with a pre-order period to manufacture according to demand. According to Fairhurst, the limited ordering window acts as a call to action that helps the company reach a minimum order quantity. Limited Run Games also began producing collector's editions. As Mighty Rabbit Studios returned to contract work, the two companies were formally separated. By October 2017, Limited Run Games had relocated from Cary to nearby Apex.

=== Legal hurdles (2017–2019) ===
In September 2017, the ESRB introduced a lowered fee for rating games brought from digital to physical formats. In response, the major console manufacturers introduced requirements that all games released for their platforms must carry a rating. This change forced Limited Run Games and similar companies to apply, pay, and wait for ESRB ratings for each game released. While it did not have to cancel any release, the company noted that the new requirement represented a hurdle, as it was covering the entire production cost of each game. In October 2018, Limited Run Games partnered with the electronics market chain Best Buy to have limited quantities of select games, including Yooka-Laylee and Golf Story, stocked at Best Buy's stores.

In the same month, Limited Run Games filed a lawsuit against the Spanish publisher BadLand Games. The two companies had partnered in 2017 to release a physical version of Axiom Verge for the Wii U. Fairhurst said his company had prepaid $78,000 for BadLand Games to deliver 6,000 copies by November. However, the company missed this target and ceased communications by March 2018. Two weeks after the lawsuit was filed, BadLand Games's CEO, Luis Quintans, explained his company had been liquidated and he now operated a new company, BadLand Publishing. While he planned to repay all outstanding debt, the publishing rights for Axiom Verge had reverted to its developer, Thomas Happ. Limited Run Games ultimately worked with Happ to release Axiom Verge in March 2019. As Limited Run Games had to pay for all copies anew, it invested $120,000, although Fairhurst believed that the company would recoup no more than a third of that from sales.

=== Continued expansion and acquisition by Embracer Group (2018–present) ===
At its first press conference, held during E3 2018, Limited Run Games announced it had begun helping other developers to port and digitally release their games for the Nintendo Switch. The company had previously only released Saturday Morning RPG in this manner, chiefly to learn how to bring games to the platform. Its first such ports were Cosmic Star Heroine and Night Trap. In 2019, Limited Run Games partnered with Disney to release collector's editions of several older Star Wars video games. This marked the company's first major foray into releasing retro games, having previously focused principally on contemporary games. Limited Run Games saw a significant increase in demand for its games between 2020 and 2021, the early years of the COVID-19 pandemic. However, the overall higher demand for various products during that time caused an impasse for deliveries from China, impacting Limited Run Games's manufacturing capabilities. By September 2020, the company had released more than 500 games. It grew its staff to over 50 people by October 2021, up from 20 in March 2020.

In April 2022, Limited Run Games opened a retail store at MacGregor Village, a shopping mall in Cary. The store primarily stocks the company's releases, with 25% of its capacity reserved for other media and merchandise. The store is operated through Limited Run Games's wholly owned subsidiary Limited Run Retail, LLC. In July, the company announced the formation of SuperDeluxe Games, a joint venture with the Japanese localization company 8-4 that distributes Limited Run Games's releases in Japan. Limited Run Games owns 40% of SuperDeluxe Games. In August 2022, Embracer Group announced that it had agreed to acquire Limited Run Games from Fairhurst and Bogart to undisclosed terms. The acquisition was completed on September 6, and Limited Run Games was incorporated into Embracer Group's newest operative group, Embracer Freemode, with Fairhurst and Bogart retaining their management roles. According to marketing director Alena Alambeigi, the acquisition gave Limited Run Games access to the many intellectual properties owned by Embracer Group. Later in September, Limited Run Games announced the launch of the book imprint Press Run, led by Jeremy Parish and Jared Petty, former editors for the video game websites USgamer and IGN, respectively. The company had 69 employees at this time.

Bogart left Limited Run Games in May 2023. In 2024, the company faced backlash for selling the 3DO version of D on CD-R discs, which are burned instead of pressed, leading to playback issues on 3DO consoles. The company claimed it chose CD-Rs because there were "quality and reliability issues" with pressed discs and that CD-Rs offered better compatibility with the 3DO console, which was pointed out as incorrect. However, Bogart alleged that Fairhurst chose CD-Rs because they were cheaper, despite objections from staff. Bogart also shared concerns about Fairhurst's management style, including a "cut corners" culture, workplace harassment, and mismanagement. Fairhurst stepped down as CEO in September 2025 while remaining the company president before scaling back his involvement in March 2026.

== Carbon Engine ==
Limited Run Games develops the Carbon Engine to bring games from older video game platforms to personal computers, newer Xbox models, the PlayStation 4, PlayStation 5, and Nintendo Switch. The Carbon Engine uses emulators for each supported platform, with some developed internally and others licensed. As of 2021, it supports the Game Boy, Game Boy Color, Game Boy Advance, Nintendo Entertainment System, Super Nintendo Entertainment System, and Sega Genesis. Limited Run Games later added compatibility with PlayStation and Sega CD games. The first games to use the Carbon Engine were Shantae and River City Girls Zero. Development of the Carbon Engine was led by Joe Modzeleski and Dimitris Giannakis, both of whom departed the company in 2025 to join Digital Eclipse.
