= Shantae: Half-Genie Hero =

2016 video game

- Developer: WayForward Technologies (Note: Additional work by Inti Creates)
- Publisher: WayForward Technologies (Note: Retail versions on PlayStation 4, PlayStation Vita, and Nintendo Switch were published by Xseed Games in the US, Pqube Games in the UK, and Oizumi Amuzio Inc. in Japan.)
- Director: Matt Bozon
- Producers: Christopher Shanley; Glenn Seidel
- Designers: Matt Bozon; James Montagna
- Programmer: Walter Hecht
- Artists: Elina Bell; Chris Drysdale; GGDG
- Writer: Matt Bozon
- Composer: Jake Kaufman
- Series: Shantae
- Platforms: PlayStation 4 PlayStation Vita; Wii U Windows; Xbox One; Nintendo Switch; Amazon Luna; Stadia; PlayStation 5
- Release: PS4, Vita, Wii U, Windows, Xbox One; December 20, 2016; Nintendo Switch; June 8, 2017; Amazon Luna; October 20, 2020; Stadia; February 23, 2021; PlayStation 5; November 2, 2021
- Genre: Platform
- Mode: Single-player

Shantae: Half-Genie Hero is a 2016 platform video game developed and published by WayForward Technologies. It is the fourth game in the Shantae series, following Shantae and the Pirate's Curse (2014). The game was crowdfunded via Kickstarter and PayPal, raising over US$900,000. It was first released for PlayStation 4, PlayStation Vita, Wii U, Windows, and Xbox One, later being ported to Nintendo Switch, Stadia, and PlayStation 5.

== Gameplay ==
Like the previous installments of the series, the player takes control of Shantae, a half-genie who can use her hair as a whip to attack enemies. Throughout the game, Shantae can obtain dances that allow her to transform into various forms, each with their own abilities that can access otherwise inaccessible areas. Along with returning transformations, such as the monkey and elephant, new forms include a bat that can cross long gaps, a crab that can maneuver underwater, and a mouse that can crawl into small mazes. These transformations can be further upgraded with new abilities.

Unlike past Shantae titles, which featured connected world maps that could be freely explored, Half-Genie Hero is divided up into several action stages, which can be replayed to obtain new items that become accessible with the use of certain powers, some of which are required to progress through the story. The magic meter system from Risky's Revenge returns, which allows Shantae to use unlocked spells at will instead of through single-use items.

Completing the game unlocks "Hero Mode", which gives Shantae access to several of her transformations from the beginning of the game in order to facilitate speedruns. An additional "Hard Core Mode", featuring more difficult enemies, was later added via a free update. Upon finishing any of the game's campaigns, the player is rewarded with bonus artwork based on their final time and completion percentage. This artwork can be viewed via an in-game gallery, which also features concept art and several pieces of fan art by higher-tier Kickstarter backers. The game is presented in high definition, with 2D vector character sprites on 3D environments, unlike previous entries' dedicated pixel art aesthetic.

== Plot ==
Late one night, the half-genie Shantae is awoken by the sound of a voice. Following it outside, she discovers a secret cave, where a messenger from the Genie Realm warns her of an impending evil that only she can defeat, but disappears before it can elaborate further. Shantae suddenly awakens, revealing the experience to have been a dream. She goes to visit her Uncle Mimic, who is working on a new invention, the Dynamo, which will keep Scuttle Town constantly powered and safe from attack. However, the pirate Risky Boots begins a siege on Scuttle Town, with one of her Tinkerbat minions stealing Mimic's blueprints. Shantae gives chase and defeats Risky, retrieving the blueprints, but Mayor Scuttlebutt once again fires her from her position as the town's guardian genie due to Risky's escape and the damage incurred. Mimic reveals that several components are still needed to complete the Dynamo, so Shantae begins searching across Sequin Land for the remaining components, helping those she finds in need of assistance along the way.

With help from her friends Sky, Bolo and Rottytops, Shantae retrieves all of the components needed to finish the Dynamo. Mimic switches the device on, but the Dynamo goes haywire and blasts Shantae with dark magic, turning her to her Nega-Shantae form. Risky appears and reveals she had swapped Mimic's blueprints with her own, and that she plans to power up the machine and use it to invert the magical polarity of the entire Genie Realm, turning them evil. Shantae attacks the group while Risky escapes with the Dynamo in tow, but Shantae's friends manage to snap her out of her trance, returning her to normal. To prevent Risky's plan, Mimic creates a Magical Polarizer to reverse the Dynamo's effects, and Shantae sets out for Risky's hideout. Upon arrival, Shantae defeats Risky and the Dynamo-powered Tinkerbrain, but the messenger from her dream pulls her into the Genie Realm and reveals their magic has already been corrupted. With no choice left, Shantae decides she must destroy the Genie Realm to keep the world safe and destroys the repowered Tinkerbrain, returning to the real world and escaping the exploding hideout as Risky swears vengeance.

Shantae reunites with her friends at her lighthouse, where Mayor Scuttlebutt announces Shantae is rehired as Scuttle Town's guardian genie. As the others depart, Shantae expresses regret for having to destroy the Genie Realm, but the messenger appears and reveals that Mimic's Magical Polarizer worked, purifying their magic and saving the Realm. The messenger also explains that Shantae's mother is alive and well in the Genie Realm, having given up Shantae as a child to keep her safe while devoting her own life to protecting the real world from greater threats. Finally understanding her mother's sacrifice, Shantae leaves to celebrate with her friends as the messenger returns to the Genie Realm. If Shantae defeats the Tinkerbrain without acquiring the Magical Polarizer, an alternate ending occurs where Shantae accidentally destroys the Genie Realm, consequently losing all of her genie powers and abilities.

Additional DLC story campaigns retell the events of the game's final act from the perspective of other characters. In Pirate Queen's Quest, Risky Boots gives an exaggerated explanation of her actions after stealing the Dynamo, collecting components to strengthen the machine and Genie Crystals to open the way to the Genie Realm. In Friends to the End, after Shantae is transformed into Nega-Shantae by the Dynamo, she is knocked out and a portal is created from the excess dark magic. Sky, Bolo and Rottytops enter the portal, which takes them into the Nightmare Realm formed from Shantae's now-corrupted memories, and the three must work together to reach the true Shantae within and restore her to normal. The Costume Pack DLC and a post-launch update add four non-canon "what-if" storylines, in which Shantae undergoes ninjitsu training, seeks out the perfect beach spot, hosts a slumber party, and becomes a cybernetic peace officer from Mighty Switch Force.

== Development ==
WayForward Technologies unveiled Shantae: Half-Genie Hero in early September 2013 as the first game in the series for home consoles, featuring graphics by Inti Creates. The game was crowdfunded via a Kickstarter campaign with a target goal of $400,000 which ended on October 4, 2013 with more than $800,000 (including PayPal donations), which was over double the target. Following the Kickstarter campaign's end, WayForward continued to accept donations via PayPal on its website up to December 16, 2014, raising a total of over $900K. The original release date was October 2014, but because of the additional funding and promised stretch goals the game was delayed. Ports of the game for PlayStation 3 and Xbox 360 were announced as part of the Kickstarter campaign; however, these versions were later announced to be cancelled in August 2016. Wayforward noted that less than 1% of backers cited these as their preferred console in surveys, and felt this low demand would not justify the time and cost needed to develop these versions. Development was completed by November 2016.

Matt Bozon, one of the creators of Shantae series, revealed that the title of the game was stylised as ½ Genie Hero as a tribute to Rumiko Takahashi's manga Ranma ½, which he cited several times as an influence on the Shantae series.

== Release ==
The game was digitally released in December 2016 for PlayStation 4, PlayStation Vita, Wii U, Windows, and Xbox One. Marvelous USA published a retail edition of the PlayStation 4, PlayStation Vita, and Wii U versions of the game in North America. The limited "Risky Beats" edition contains a thirty track soundtrack CD. A version for the Nintendo Switch was released digitally on June 8, 2017, while a physical "Ultimate Edition" including all DLC released on April 3, 2018. The game was ported to Amazon Luna in 2020, and Stadia and PlayStation 5 in 2021.

=== Expansions ===
As part of additional stretch goals fulfilled during the game's Kickstarter campaign, additional story campaigns featuring alternate playable characters and gameplay styles have been added to the game as downloadable content (DLC). Players who supported the game's Kickstarter received all DLC for free, along with additional in-game rewards for higher-tier backers. The game's "Ultimate Edition" release includes all DLC expansions, including the content previously exclusive to Kickstarter backers.

The first expansion, "Pirate Queen's Quest", was released on August 29, 2017, and stars Shantae's nemesis Risky Boots, set during the game's final act as Risky collects the parts for her Tinkerbrain weapon. Risky uses "Tinker-tools" as substitutes to Shantae's powers, similar to Shantae's abilities in Shantae and the Pirate's Curse. Pirate Queen's Quest follows a similar structure to that of Shantae's campaign, but features changed stage layouts and adds new enemies, new puzzles, and a new end boss.

A second expansion, "Friends to the End", was released on December 12, 2017, and takes place during the final act as Shantae's friends enter her mind to turn her back to normal after the Dynamo corrupts her. Players switch control between three characters: Sky, who can use birds as platforms, Bolo, whose ball-and-chain can grapple and swing from hooks, and Rottytops, who can throw her head to pass barriers and reach distant platforms.

A third expansion, the "Costume Pack", was released on April 10, 2018, and includes three additional non-canon story campaigns: "Ninja Mode", "Beach Mode", and "Officer Mode", each of which features Shantae wearing a different costume that gives her new abilities and alters her playstyle. A free game update on July 31, 2018 added a fourth costume campaign, "Jammies Mode", as well as an unlockable transformation for the main campaign based on Sophia III from Blaster Master Zero, which had released DLC adding Shantae as a playable character earlier that month.

== Reception ==
=== Sales ===
The limited-release Ultimate Day One Edition of the game, produced in partnership with Xseed Games, became one of the fastest-selling products of its history. According to WayForward Technologies, the game's sales on Nintendo Switch "[broke] sales records".

=== Critical reception ===
Reception

Aggregate score
Aggregator	Score
Metacritic	PC: 76/100; PS4: 81/100; Vita: 82/100; WIIU: 80/100; XONE: 80/100; NS: 82/100

Review scores
Publication	Score
Destructoid	7.5/10
Game Informer	7.75/10
GameSpot	8/10
IGN	8/10
Nintendo Life	9/10
Nintendo World Report	9/10
Push Square	7/10

Shantae: Half-Genie Hero received "generally favorable reviews" according to Metacritic.

USgamer's Nadia Oxford rated it 4 stars out of 5, praising the game's "lush backgrounds and butter-smooth animations", as well as its "surreal sense of humor", but expressed disappointment at the game being a "soft reboot", not following the plot from Pirate's Curse. IGN's Vince Ingenito rated it 8 out of 10, approving its varied action and level design, comparing Shantae's animal transformations to the suits in Super Mario Bros. 3; he also commented that "its hand-drawn look and toe-tapping music successfully channel a joy and enthusiasm that has become far too rare in modern video games." Kotaku's Mike Fahey called it "a whole lot of fun", praising its gorgeous visuals, rich music, and smooth gameplay. Destructoid's Kevin McClusky rated it a 7.5 out of 10, calling its visuals "unbelievably gorgeous" and the soundtrack "excellent"; however, he criticized the excessive difficulty in some spots and the lack of a map system. Mitch Vogel of Nintendo Life gave the Switch version of the game an "excellent" 9 out of 10. He explained that while the Switch version added nothing brand new, and the game could be longer, it was still "charming, colourful, and sometimes challenging". He described it as "the most polished Shantae game yet" and praised its release near that of the first DLC expansion, saying it would add some replay value to the game. In Japan, the Ultimate Edition of the game garnered a 33/40 score from Famitsu.
