= List of Limited Run Games releases =

This is a list of games released by Limited Run Games, an American video game distributor founded by Douglas Bogart and Josh Fairhurst.

== Limited Run Games collection ==
Limited Run Games sells two types of games: numbered titles and distributed titles, more commonly known as "distros".

Here are the platforms on which Limited Run Games are released or distributed on behalf of the producers. Numbered (#) releases are part of the Limited Run Games Collection.

LRG releases for the PlayStation Vita, PS3, PS4 and PSVR are part of one consecutive run.

LRG releases for the Xbox One and Xbox Series X/S are part of a separate run, starting from #001.

The PlayStation 5 and Nintendo Switch each have their own lines of released numbers, each starting from #001.

Platform	Limited run #	Dates released	Notes	Ref
PlayStation Vita	Odd numbers: 001–015, 019–023, 027–035, 039–045, 053–057, 061–065, 069, 071, 079, 081, 087, 091–095, 101, 109–127, 137, 145–149, 155–177, 185, 189–195, 199, 205, 209, 215, 219–239, 247 Even numbers: 028, 050, 066, 094, 096, 100, 160, 222–240, 246, 248	October 28, 2015 – July 30, 2021	Breach & Clear was the first ever limited numbered released, with Sony's Vita being the first console. Vita manufacturing shut down in all regions outside of Asia in February 2019. Due to cartridge shortages, the last Vita titles were released years after they were produced. Super Meat Boy went on sale on July 30, 2021.	
PlayStation 3	244, 270	February 15, 2019 June 14, 2019	There were only two numbered limited game releases for the PS3. These were Oddworld: Stranger's Wrath and Oddworld: New 'n' Tasty!	
PlayStation 4	Odd numbers: 017, 025, 037, 047–051, 059, 067, 073–077, 083, 085, 089, 097, 099, 103–107, 129–135, 139–143, 151, 153, 179–183, 187, 197, 201, 203, 207, 213, 217, 241–245, 249–251, 255, 259–301, 305, 309–351, 355–407, 411, 413, 417–477, 481–495 Even numbers: 002–026, 030–048, 052–064, 068–092, 098, 102–132,136–158, 162–186, 190–196, 200–216, 220, 242, 250–262, 266–268, 274–280, 284–306, 310–328, 332–382, 386–454, 458, 460, 464–494	January 2, 2016 – present	Saturday Morning RPG was the first limited numbered release for the PS4.	
PlayStation VR	134, 188, 198, 211, 218, 253, 257, 264, 272, 282, 303, 307, 308, 330, 353, 384, 409, 415, 456, 459, 462, 479	March 21, 2018 – present	Pixel Gear was the first limited numbered release for the PSVR.	
PlayStation 5	001–046	November 6, 2020 – present	Cthulhu Saves Christmas was the first limited numbered release for the PS5.	
Nintendo Switch	001–172	March 30, 2018 – present	Thimbleweed Park was the first limited numbered released for the Switch.	
Nintendo Switch 2	001	February 1, 2026 – present	High on Life is the first limited numbered release for Switch 2.	
Xbox One	001–002, 004–005	August 5, 2022 – present	Doom 64 was the first limited numbered release for the Xbox One. These games are compatible with the Xbox Series X/S.	
Xbox Series X/S	003, 006	September 9, 2022	River City Girls 2 was the first numbered release for the Xbox Series X/S.	
Nintendo 3DS	001-004	August 7, 2020 - September 2, 2022	There were only four numbered limited game releases for the Nintendo 3DS. These were Atooi Collection, Kokopolo, Kokopolo 3D & Shantae and the Pirate's Curse.	
Atari 2600	These consoles do have games distributed by Limited Run Games, but to date do not have assigned limited release numbers.			
Nintendo Entertainment System (NES)	These consoles do have games distributed by Limited Run Games, but to date do not have assigned limited release numbers.			
Super Nintendo Entertainment System (SNES)	These consoles do have games distributed by Limited Run Games, but to date do not have assigned limited release numbers.			
Game Boy	These consoles do have games distributed by Limited Run Games, but to date do not have assigned limited release numbers.			
Game Boy Color	These consoles do have games distributed by Limited Run Games, but to date do not have assigned limited release numbers.			
Nintendo 64	These consoles do have games distributed by Limited Run Games, but to date do not have assigned limited release numbers.			
PC	These consoles do have games distributed by Limited Run Games, but to date do not have assigned limited release numbers.			
Sega Genesis	These consoles do have games distributed by Limited Run Games, but to date do not have assigned limited release numbers.			
Sega CD	These consoles do have games distributed by Limited Run Games, but to date do not have assigned limited release numbers.			
Sega 32X	These consoles do have games distributed by Limited Run Games, but to date do not have assigned limited release numbers.			
Wii U	These consoles do have games distributed by Limited Run Games, but to date do not have assigned limited release numbers.			
Xbox	These consoles do have games distributed by Limited Run Games, but to date do not have assigned limited release numbers.			

== List ==
Title	Limited run #	Developer(s)	Genre(s)	Standard edition release date(s)	Ref
2064: Read Only Memories	105 (PS4) 161 (Vita) 054 (Switch)	MidBoss	Graphic adventure	November 17, 2017 (PS4); June 29, 2018 (Vita) November 29, 2019 (Switch)	
8-Bit Adventure Anthology	182 (PS4)	Abstraction Games	Adventure	October 12, 2018	
8bit Music Power	Distro (NES)	RIKI	Music	March 19, 2021	Standard; Collectors
8bit Music Power Final	Distro (NES)			March 19, 2021	
9th Dawn III	431 (PS4) Distro (Switch)	Valorware	Role-playing, adventure, action	November 5, 2021 (PS4) September 6, 2022 (Switch)	
A-Train Express	264 (PSVR)	Artdink	Vehicle simulation	May 22, 2019	
Aaero	143 (PS4)	Mad Fellows	Action game	May 11, 2018	
Absolute Drift: Zen Edition	085 (PS4)	Funselektor	Racing	October 13, 2017	
Absolver	Distro (PS4)	Special Reserve Games		November 1, 2017	
Accounting+	272 (PSVR)	Crows Crows Crows	Adventure	June 26, 2019	
Ace of Seafood	142 (PS4)	Nussoft	Shoot 'em up	May 11, 2018	
ADK Damashii	315 (PS4)			December 27, 2019	
Adventure	Distro (Atari 2600)			June 28, 2022	
Aegis Defenders	034 (Switch) 261 (PS4)	Guts Department	Platform, tower defense	May 10, 2019	
Afterparty	095 (Switch) 387 (PS4)			January 29, 2021	
AI: The Somnium Files	Distro (PC)	Spike Chunsoft		July 30, 2019	
Airheart: Tales of Broken Wings	269 (PS4)			June 7, 2019	
Akka Arrh	181 (Switch) 052 (PS5) 502 (PS4)	Atari SA	Arcade	2023	
Alone With You	240 (Vita) 241 (PS4)			April 19, 2019	
Alphadia Genesis	008 (PS5) 412 (PS4)	Kemco		July 23, 2021	
Alphadia Genesis 2	023 (PS5) 455 (PS4)	Kemco		April 1, 2022	
Alvastia Chronicles	311 (PS4)			November 8, 2019	
Alwa's Awakening	Distro (NES, PC)	Retro-Bit Publishing		September 14, 2021	
Alwa's Collection	Distro (Switch, PS4)	Clear River Games		September 14, 2021	
Always Sometimes Monsters	435 (PS4) Distro (Switch)	Vagabond Dog		November 12, 2021 (PS4) November 1, 2022 (Switch)	
Amazing Penguin	Distro (Game Boy)			March 5, 2021	
Amazon's Training Road	Distro (NES)			March 25, 2022	
American Hero	026 (PS5) 151 (Switch) 465 (PS4)			June 3, 2022	
Among the Sleep	Distro (Switch, PS4, Xbox One)	Soedesco		August 18, 2020	
Angry Video Game Nerd 1 & 2 Deluxe	Distro (Switch, PS4)	Screenwave Media		November 23, 2021	
ANNO: Mutationem	019 (PS5) 165 (Switch) 450 (PS4)			March 25, 2022 (PS5, PS4) October 21, 2022 (Switch)	
Another World: 20th Anniversary Edition	026 (Switch) 177 (Vita) 180 (PS4)	Delphine Software	Action-adventure	September 28, 2018 (PS4, Vita); February 1, 2019 (Switch)	
Antiquia Lost	146 (PS4) 147 (Vita)	Exe Create Inc.	Role-playing	May 25, 2018	
Aqua Kitty DX	035 (Vita) 036 (PS4)	Tikipod	Shoot 'em up	January 27, 2017	
Aquaventure	Distro (Atari 2600)	Atari, Inc.		May 10, 2022	
Arc of Alchemist	Distro (Switch)	Idea Factory		March 31, 2020	
Arcade Classics Anniversary Collection	487 (PS4) 166 (Switch)			2023	
Arcade Paradise	Distro (Switch, PS4, PS5)	Wired Productions		June 28, 2022	
Armed Emeth	030 (PS5) 471 (PS4)			July 22, 2022	
Art of Fighting Anthology	375 (PS4)			November 13, 2020	
Arzette: The Jewel of Faramore	221 (Switch) 548 (PS4) 085 (PS5) 013 (Xbox)	Seedy Eye Software	Adventure	2023	
Asdivine Collection	Distro (Switch)	Clear River Games		October 5, 2021	
Asdivine Cross	035 (PS5) 477 (PS4)			September 23, 2022	
Asdivine Dios	374 (PS4)			November 6, 2020	
Asdivine Hearts	079 (Vita) 080 (PS4)	Exe Create Inc.	Role-playing	August 25, 2017	
Asdivine Hearts II	295 (PS4)			September 20, 2019	
Asdivine Kamura	349 (PS4)			June 19, 2020	
Asdivine Menace	380 (PS4)			December 18, 2020	
Asdivine Saga	491 (PS4) 044 (PS5)			2023	
Assault Suits Valken Declassified	202 (Switch)	Rainmaker Productions	Action, arcade	December 2024	
Astalon: Tears of the Earth	138 (Switch) 445 (PS4)			January 21, 2022	
Astebreed	051 (PS4)	Edelweiss	Shoot 'em up	March 31, 2017	
Asteroids	Distro (Atari 2600)			2023	
Astral Ascent	(PS4)			2023	
Astro Aqua Kitty	453 (PS4) Distro (Switch)	Tikipod		March 18, 2022 (PS4) May 10, 2022 (Switch)	
Atari Flashback Classics	237 (Vita)	Code Mystics, Atari	Compilation	August 2, 2019	
Atari Mania	Distro (Switch)	Atari		October 11, 2022	
Atari Recharged Collection 1	488 (PS4) 168 (Switch) 042 (PS5)			2023	
Atari Recharged Collection 2	489 (PS4) 169 (Switch) 043 (PS5)			2023	
Atooi Collection (Mutant Mudds Collection, Bomb Monkey, Xeodrifter, Chicken Wiggle)	001 (3DS)	Atooi (Renegade Kid)	Platform	August 7, 2020	
Avenging Spirit	Distro (Game Boy)	Retro-Bit		May 31, 2022	
Avicii Invector	Distro (Switch)	Wired Productions		September 1, 2020	
Away: Journey to the Unexpected	Distro (Switch, PS4)	Dear Villagers		December 31, 2019	
Axiom Verge: Multiverse Edition	430 (PS4) Distro (Wii U) 123 (Switch)	Thomas Happ Games	Metroidvania	March 29, 2019 (PS4, Wii U) October 1, 2021 (Switch)	
Ayo The Clown	Distro (PS4, Switch)			2023	
Azur Lane: Crosswave	Distro (PS4, Switch)	Idea Factory		November 5, 2019 (PS4) February 24, 2021 (Switch)	
Azure Striker Gunvolt 3 *	Distro (Switch)	Inti Creates		July 28, 2022	
Bad North	058 (Switch)	Plausible Concept, Raw Fury	Real-time strategy	January 3, 2020	
Bard's Gold	064 (PS4) 065 (Vita)	Pixel Lantern	Platform	July 7, 2017	
Bard's Tale: Remastered and Resnarkled	289 (PS4)			August 16, 2019	
Bastion	173 (Vita) 174 (PS4)	Supergiant Games	Action role-playing	July 27, 2018	
BATS: Bloodsucker Anti-Terror Squad	Distro (Switch, PS4, PS5)	The Media Indie Exchange		June 7, 2022	
Battle Axe	Distro (Switch, PS4)	Numskull Games		May 11, 2021	
Battle Chef Brigade Deluxe	019 (Switch) 197 (PS4)	Trinket Studios	Beat 'em up, puzzle	November 9, 2018	
Battle Garegga Rev. 2016	263 (PS4)			May 10, 2019	
Battle Princess Madelyn	050 (Switch) 298 (PS4)	Casual Bit Games	Action, Metroidvania	October 25, 2019	
Battletoads & Double Dragon	Distro (NES)	Retro-Bit		April 19, 2022	
Being Home Alone With You Is Worse Than Death	Distro (Switch)	Bancy Co.		August 16, 2022	
Bill & Ted's Excellent Retro Collection	025 (PS5) 152 (Switch) 463 (PS4)			June 9, 2022	
Billion Road	Distro (Switch)	Acttil		November 10, 2020	
The Bit.Trip	112 (PS4) 113 (Vita)	Choice Provisions	Action platform	January 19, 2018	
Black Bird	068 (Switch)	Onion Games	Shoot 'em up	April 10, 2020	
Blacksmith of the Sand Kingdom	017 (PS5) 440 (PS4) Distro (Switch)	Kemco		January 14, 2022	
Blade Runner: Enhanced Edition	153 (Switch) 466 (PS4)			June 24, 2022	
Blasphemous	052 (Switch) 304 (PS4)	The Game Kitchen	Action, Metroidvania	November 15, 2019	
Blaster Master Zero	073 (Switch) 345 (PS4)	Inti Creates	Action, Metroidvania	May 29, 2020	
Blaster Master Zero 2	074 (Switch) 346 (PS4)	Inti Creates	Action, Metroidvania	May 29, 2020	
Blaster Master Zero 3	109 (Switch) 406 (PS4)	Inti Creates	Action, Metroidvania	June 4, 2021	
BlazBlue Central Fiction	Distro (Switch)	Arc System Works		November 9, 2021	
Blazing Chrome	048 (Switch) 296 (PS4)	JoyMasher, The Arcade Crew	Run-and-gun	September 27, 2019	
Bloodrayne Betrayal: Fresh Bites	012 (PS5) 120 (Switch) 425 (PS4)			September 3, 2021	
Bloodrayne: Revamped	015 (PS5) 126 (Switch) 432 (PS4)			October 22, 2021	
Bloodrayne 2: Revamped	016 (PS5) 127 (Switch) 433 (PS4)			October 22, 2021	
Bloodroots	501 (PS4) 051 (PS5)	Paper Cult	Hack and slash	2023	
Bloodshore	490 (PS4)				
Bloodstained: Curse of the Moon	031 (Switch) 236 (Vita) 249 (PS4)	Inti Creates	Platform	March 15, 2019	
Bloodstained: Curse of the Moon 2	098 (Switch) 390 (PS4)			February 26, 2021	
Blossom Tales: The Sleeping King	056 (Switch)	Castle Pixel	Action-adventure	December 20, 2019	
Blossom Tales II: The Minotaur Prince	Distro (Switch)				
Bomb Chicken	032 (Switch) 251 (PS4)	Nitrome	Platform, puzzle	March 29, 2019	
Bonds of the Skies	342 (PS4)			May 8, 2020	
A Boy and His Blob	461 (PS4) 149 (Switch)	Ziggurat Interactive	Platformer, action, adventure, puzzle	May 13, 2022	
A Boy and His Blob: Trouble on Blobolonia	Distro (NES)			January 21, 2022	
Boyfriend Dungeon	Distro (PC)			August 10, 2021	
BPM: Bullets Per Minute	Distro (Switch, PS4)				
Breach & Clear	001 (Vita)	Mighty Rabbit Studios	Turn-based strategy	October 28, 2015	
Breach & Clear: Deadline	014 (PS4)	Mighty Rabbit Studios; Gun Media	Turn-based strategy	July 29, 2016	
Brigandine: The Legend of Runersia	071 (Switch) 368 (PS4)	Matrix Software	Turn-based strategy	May 1, 2020 (Switch) October 9, 2020 (PS4)	
Broken Age	016 (Switch) 060 (PS4) 061 (Vita)	Double Fine Productions	Adventure	June 9, 2017 (PS4, Vita); October 12, 2018 (Switch)	
Bub-O Escape	Distro (Game Boy Color)			September 9, 2022	
Bubsy: Paws on Fire!	Distro (Switch)	Accolade		August 27, 2019	
Bug Fables: The Everlasting Sapling	105 (Switch) 400 (PS4)	Moonsprout Games	Role-playing	April 23, 2021	
The Bunker	067 (PS4)	Splendy Games	Adventure	August 11, 2017	
Butcher	200 (PS4)			November 23, 2018	
Caladrius Blaze	084 (PS4)	MOSS	Shoot 'em up	September 15, 2017	
Carrion	458 (PS4) Distro (Switch)	Special Reserve Games		July 23, 2020 (Switch) September 16, 2022 (PS4)	
Castlevania Advance Collection	198 (Switch) 524 (PS4)	Konami, M2	Action, platformer, role-playing	July 28, 2023	
Castlevania Anniversary Collection	106 (Switch) 405 (PS4) 7 (XB1)	Konami, M2	Action, platformer	May 14, 2021	
Castlevania Requiem	443 (PS4)	Konami	Action, platformer, role-playing	January 14, 2022	
Castlevania: Rondo of Blood				TBA	
Cat Girl Without Salad: Amuse-Bouche	145 (Switch)			April 1, 2022	
Catlateral Damage: Remeowstered	Distro (Switch, PS4, PS5)	Manekoware		May 10, 2022	
Celeste	023 (Switch) 207 (PS4)	Maddy Makes Games	Platform	February 1, 2019	
Chariot	086 (PS4)	Frima Studio	Puzzle, platform	October 13, 2017	
Chasm	085 (Switch) 369 (PS4)	Bit Kid, Inc.	Metroidvania	October 9, 2020	
Children of Zodiarcs	306 (PS4)			October 18, 2019	
Chroma Quaternion	041 (PS5) 486 (PS4)			November 4, 2022	
Chronus Arc	235 (Vita) 242 (PS4)			March 1, 2019	
Citizens Unite: Earth x Space	Distro (Switch, PS4)	Raiser Games		November 16, 2021	
Claire: Extended Cut	101 (Vita) 102 (PS4)	Hailstorm Games	Survival horror	December 1, 2017	
Clannad	Distro (Switch)	Sekai Project		April 14, 2020	
Close To The Sun	Distro (Switch)	Wired Productions		August 4, 2020	
Cogen + Gunvolt Double Pack		Gemdrops / Inti Creates			
Cogen: Sword of Rewind		Gemdrops			
The Coma 2: Vicious Sisters	429 (PS4)			October 22, 2021	
The Complex	389 (PS4)			February 5, 2021	
Contra Anniversary Collection	140 (Switch) 446 (PS4)			April 29, 2022	
Corpse Killer: 25th Anniversary Edition	087 (Switch) 279 (PS4)	Screaming Villains, Flash Film Works	Interactive movie, rail shooter	July 5, 2019 (PS4); October 30, 2020 (Switch)	
Cosmic Star Heroine	020 (Switch) 144 (PS4) 145 (Vita)	Zeboyd Games	Role-playing	May 25, 2018 (PS4, Vita); November 23, 2018 (Switch)	
Costume Quest 2	309 (PS4)			October 25, 2019	
Crawl	089 (PS4)	Powerhoof	Roguelike	November 17, 2017	
Croixleur Sigma	117 (Vita) 118 (PS4)	Souvenir Circ.	Hack and slash	January 26, 2018	
Crossing Souls		Special Reserve Games			
Crysis 2 Remastered		Crytek			
Crysis 3		Crytek			
Crystal Castles	Distro (2600)	Atari, Inc.		October 4, 2022	
Crystal Ortha	039 (PS5) 482 (PS4)			October 14, 2022	
Cthulhu Saves Christmas	001 (PS5) 088 (Switch)			November 6, 2020	
Curse of the Dead Gods	Distro (Switch, PS4)	Passtech Games	Roguelike	2023	
The Curse of Monkey Island		LucasArts	Point-and-click adventure	TBD	
Cursed Castilla EX		Abylight Studios			
Curses 'N Chaos	033 (Vita) 034 (PS4)	Tribute Games	Arena brawler	February 3, 2017	
Cyanide & Happiness - Freakpocalypse (Episode 1)	Distro (Switch, PS4)	Serenity Forge	Point-and-click adventure	March 11, 2021 (Switch) October 26, 2021 (PS4)	
Damascus Gear: Operation Osaka	231 (Vita) 287 (PS4)	Arc System Works	Mecha, hack and slash	September 6, 2019	
Damascus Gear: Operation Tokyo	220 (Vita) 286 (PS4)	Arc System Works	Mecha, hack and slash	September 6, 2019	
Dangun Feveron	398 (PS4)			April 9, 2021	
Danmaku Unlimited 3	024 (Switch)	Doragon Entertainment	Bullet hell	January 18, 2019	
Dariusburst: Chronicle Saviours	048 (PS4) 066 (Vita)	Pyramid; Chara-Ani; G.rev	Shoot 'em up	April 28, 2017 (PS4); June 23, 2017 (Vita)	
The Dark Crystal: Age of Resistance Tactics	376 (PS4)			December 18, 2020	
Dark Devotion	318 (PS4) 057 (Switch)	Hibernian Workshop, The Arcade Crew	Action role-playing, adventure	December 20, 2019 (PS4)	
Dark Nights with Poe & Munro	441 (PS4)			December 17, 2021	
Dark Quest 2	334 (PS4)			April 10, 2020	
Darkwood	362 (PS4)			September 4, 2020	
DARQ: Complete Edition	Distro (Switch, PS4, PS5)	Unfold Games		August 3, 2021	
Dawn of the Monsters	448 (PS4) 020 (PS5)			March 4, 2022	
Day of the Tentacle Remastered	470 (PS4)			July 22, 2022	
Dead Age	366 (PS4)			January 7, 2022	
Dead Space Collector's Edition	Distro (PC, PS5, Xbox)	Electronic Arts	Action, horror, shooter	January 27, 2023	
Dead Tomb	Distro (NES)			September 4, 2020	
Deadbolt	228 (Vita) 302 (PS4)	Hopoo Games	Action, stealth	October 11, 2019	
Dear Esther Landmark Edition	042 (PS4)	Thechineseroom	Exploration	February 17, 2017	
Death End Re;Quest		Idea Factory			
Death Wish Enforcers					
Deemo: The Last Recital	063 (Vita)	Rayark Games	Rhythm	June 9, 2017	
Defender's Quest	185 (Vita) 186 (PS4)	Lars Doucet	Tower defense	October 19, 2018	
Deliver Us The Moon		Wired Productions			
Demon Turf	022 (PS5)			March 18, 2022	
Demon's Tier	373 (PS4)			October 23, 2020	
Demon's Tilt	428 (PS4)			October 1, 2021	
Desert Child	267 (PS4)			May 17, 2019	
Destroy All Humans!	370 (PS4)			October 16, 2020	
Detroit: Become Human	Distro (PC)	Quantic Dream		July 2, 2020	
Divinity: Original Sin II Definitive Edition	055 (Switch)	Larian Studios	Role-playing	December 6, 2019	
DoDonPachi Resurrection					
Doom 64	365 (PS4)	Midway Studios San Diego, Nightdive Studios (re-release)	First-person shooter	September 25, 2020	
Doom: The Classics Collection	395 (PS4)	id Software	First-person shooter	April 2, 2021	
Doom Eternal	154 (Switch)	id Software, Panic Button (Switch version)	First-person shooter	July 8, 2022	
Double Dragon IV	104 (PS4)	Arc System Works	Beat 'em up	December 8, 2017	
Double Dragon & Kunio-Kun Retro Brawler Bundle		Arc System Works	Beat 'em up	August 13, 2021	
Double Dragon Neon		Arc System Works	Beat 'em up	May 18, 2021	
Double Switch: 25th Anniversary Edition	194 (PS4) 041 (Switch)	Screaming Villains, Flash Film Works	Interactive movie	November 2, 2018 (PS4) July 19, 2019 (Switch)	
DoubleShake		Rightstick Studios	Platform		
Dragon Fantasy: The Black Tome of Ice	018 (PS4) 019 (Vita)	The Muteki Corporation	Role-playing	September 16, 2016	
Dragon Fantasy: Volumes of Westeria	214 (PS4) 234 (Vita)			April 5, 2019	
Dragon Lapis	469 (PS4) 029 (PS5)	Kemco		June 24, 2022	
Dragon Sinker: Descendants of Legend	189 (Vita) 190 (PS4)	Kemco	Role-playing	October 26, 2018	
Dragon Star Varnir	Distro (Switch)	Idea Factory		June 15, 2021	
Dragon View	Distro (SNES)			April 29, 2022	
Dragon's Lair Trilogy	183 (PS4) 036 (Switch)	Digital Leisure	Arcade	October 19, 2018 (PS4) May 24, 2019 (Switch)	
Dreamscaper					
Drive		PM Studios			
Drive!Drive!Drive!	052 (PS4)	Different Cloth	Racing	July 21, 2017	
Duck Game	294 (PS4) 046 (Switch)	Landon Podbielski	Action, platform	September 13, 2019 (PS4)	
Dusk					
Dust: An Elysian Tail	012 (Switch)	Humble Hearts	Action role-playing	August 31, 2018	
Dustwind - The Last Resort	492 (PS4) 045 (PS5)			2023	
Earth Night	379 (PS4)			December 11, 2020	
Effie	339 (PS4)			May 1, 2020	
Eldest Souls		United Label			
Enclave HD	472 (PS4) 031 (PS5)			September 23, 2022	
Ender Lilies: Quietus of the Knights		Binary Haze Interactive			
Enter The Gungeon		Special Reserve Games			
Erica	403 (PS4)			May 7, 2021	
Escape Goat 2	141 (PS4)	MagicalTimeBean	Puzzle, platform	May 18, 2018	
The Escapists: Complete Edition	030 (Switch)	Mouldy Toof Studios	Strategy, role-playing	March 1, 2019	
Espgaluda II					
Everspace: Galactic Edition	168 (PS4)	ROCKFISH Games	Space combat, roguelike	July 27, 2018	
Exile's End	158 (PS4) 159 (Vita)	Magnetic Realms	Action-adventure	July 27, 2018	
ExZeus: The Complete Collection		Ziggurat Interactive			
Factotum 90	121 (Vita) 122 (PS4)	TACS Games	Puzzle	February 9, 2018	
Fairy Fencer F: Advent Dark Force		Idea Factory			
Fallen Legion: Flames of Rebellion	109 (Vita) 327 (PS4)	YummyYummyTummy	Action-adventure, role-playing	March 9, 2018 (Vita) February 28, 2020 (PS4)	
Fallen Legion: Sins of an Empire	108 (PS4)	YummyYummyTummy	Action-adventure, role-playing	March 9, 2018	
Far: Lone Sails	421 (PS4)			September 3, 2021	
Fatal Fury: Battle Archives Volume 2	371 (PS4)			October 16, 2020	
Fatal Twelve		Prototype			
Fate/EXTELLA Link: Fleeting Glory		Xseed Games			
Fault Milestone One		Sekai Project			
Feather	442 (PS4)			December 31, 2021	
Fernz Gate	215 (Vita) 216 (PS4)			February 8, 2019	
Fight'N Rage	093 (Switch) 381 (PS4)	SebaGamesDev	Beat 'em up	January 1, 2021 Also released a bundle with the game and a 3 CD-pack of the soundtrack composed by Gonzalo Varela, as well as guitar, bass and drum digital transcription books.	
Final Vendetta		Numskull Games			
Fire Shark		Toaplan			
Firewatch	032 (PS4)	Campo Santo	Adventure	December 16, 2016	
The First Tree	225 (PS4)			April 12, 2019	
Five Dates	392 (PS4)			March 5, 2021	
Flame in the Flood	083 (PS4)	The Molasses Flood	Roguelike	September 15, 2017	
Flinthook	059 (PS4) 003 (Switch)	Tribute Games	Action	April 14, 2017 (PS4); May 7, 2018 (Switch)	
Forgotton Anne	325 (PS4) 062 (Switch)	ThroughLine Games	Action-adventure, platform	February 14, 2020 (PS4)	
Forma.8	227 (Vita) 245 (PS4)			April 5, 2019	
Frane: Dragons' Odyssey					
Freedom Finger	378 (PS4)	Wide Right Interactive	Side-scrolling shooter	December 3, 2020	
Freedom Planet	262 (PS4) 035 (Switch)	GalaxyTrail	Action, platform	June 21, 2019 (PS4)	
Freedom Planet 2	269 (Switch)	GalaxyTrail	Action, platform	April 4, 2024	
Frog Fractions 2 / Glittermitten Grove		Adult Swim Games	Alternate reality game	April 1, 2019	
Frogun		Top Hat Studios			
Full Throttle Remastered	483 (PS4)			October 7, 2022	
Furi: Definitive Edition	062 (PS4) 014 (Switch)	The Game Bakers	Shoot 'em up	June 23, 2017 (PS4); September 14, 2018 (Switch)	
Future Unfolding	136 (PS4)	Spaces of Play UG	Action-adventure	April 20, 2018	
Futuridium EP Deluxe	006 (PS4) 007 (Vita)	MixedBag	Shoot 'em up	May 9, 2016	
Fu'un Super Combo	312 (PS4)			November 29, 2019	
Gaiares		Retro-Bit Publishing			
Gal*Gunvolt Burst	360 (PS4)			August 28, 2020	
Galf	Distro (NES)	Spoony Bard Productions; Sidebar Games	Sports	September 28, 2018	
Game Tengoku CruisinMix Special	217 (PS4)			February 1, 2019	
Garden Story					
Garou: Mark of the Wolves	354 (PS4)			July 17, 2020	
Gearshifters		Numskull Games			
Ghosts					
Ghoul Patrol	Distro (SNES)			June 18, 2021	
Giga Wrecker Alt.	033 (Switch) 254 (PS4)	Game Freak	Metroidvania	April 12, 2019	
Gish		Cryptic Sea	Platform	February 14, 2020	
Glover	Distro (N64)			July 1, 2022	
Go Go Kokopolo: Harmonious Forest Revenge	002 (3DS)	Tanukii Studios Limited		September 2, 2022	
Go Go Kokopolo 3D: Space Recipe For Disaster	003 (3DS)	Tanukii Studios Limited		September 2, 2022	
Godstrike		Freedom Games			
Going Under		Team17			
Golf Story	015 (Switch)	Sidebar Games	Sports	September 28, 2018	
Good Pizza, Great Pizza		PM Studios			
Gotta Protectors: Cart of Darkness	144 (Switch)			March 25, 2022	
Grandia HD Collection	080 (Switch)	Game Arts	Role-playing	August 7, 2020	
Gravity Ghost	260 (PS4)			August 9, 2019	
Green Lava Studios Volume 1	Distro (PS4)			April 1, 2021	
Green Lava Studios Volume 2	Distro (PS4)			April 1, 2021	
Grim Fandango Remastered	005 (Xbox) 485 (PS4)			November 4, 2022	
Gris	313 (PS4)	Special Reserve Games		November 22, 2019	
Ground Zero Texas: Nuclear Edition	385 (PS4) Distro (Sega CD)			January 22, 2021	
Guacamelee!	225 (Vita)	DrinkBox Studios	Action, platform	June 14, 2019	
Gunbrick Reloaded		Nitrome			
Gunhouse	175 (Vita) 176 (PS4)	Necrosoft Games	Puzzle, strategy	August 24, 2018	
Gunvolt Chronicles: Luminous Avenger		Inti Creates			
Gunvolt Chronicles: Luminous Avenger iX 2		Inti Creates			
Guts 'N Goals		PM Studios			
Harvest Moon: One World		Natsume Inc.			
Hatch Tales					
Hatsune Miku VR	330 (PSVR)			May 27, 2022	
Haunted House		Atari, Inc.			
Haven	418 (PS4) 011 (PS5)			August 20, 2021	
Headlander	202 (PS4)	Double Fine	Metroidvania	December 7, 2018	
Heave Ho		Special Reserve Games			
Hellfire	Distro (Genesis)	Toaplan		September 15, 2020	
Hero Must Die. Again		Degica Games			
Hime's Quest	Distro (Game Boy Color)	Poppy Works		2023	
Hitman: Blood Money — Reprisal	256 (Switch)	IO Interactive	Action, adventure	2024	
Hitman 3 Deluxe Edition	Distro (PS4, PS5, Xbox Series X/S)	IO Interactive	Stealth	October 15, 2020	
A Hole New World	250 (PS4) Soundtrack (NES)	Madgear		March 15, 2019	
Holy Potatoes! Compendium	Distro (Switch)	PM Studios		October 27, 2020	
Home	127 (Vita) 128 (PS4)	Benjamin Rivers Inc.	Adventure	February 9, 2018	
Homebody	(Switch) (PS5)	Rogue Games	Action, adventure	March 2025	
Horror Tales: The Wine	475 (PS4) 033 (PS5)			October 21, 2022	
Hotline Miami	Distro (PS4)	Special Reserve Games		August 25, 2020	
Hotline Miami 2: Wrong Number	Distro (PS4)	Special Reserve Games		August 25, 2020	
Hotline Miami Collection	Distro (Switch)	Special Reserve Games		April 21, 2020	
The House in Fata Morgana	101 (Switch) 232 (Vita) 259 (PS4)	Novectacle	Visual novel	May 31, 2019 (Vita, PS4) March 26, 2021 (Switch)	
Hover	283 (PS4)	Midgar Studio, Fusty Game	Action, platform, roller	August 2, 2019	
Hue	169 (Vita) 170 (PS4)	Fiddlesticks	Puzzle, platform	July 20, 2018	
Huntdown	Distro (Switch, PS4)	Coffee Stain Studios		June 14, 2021	
Hyper Light Drifter	Distro (Switch)	Abylight Studios		December 8, 2020	
I Saw Black Clouds	449 (PS4)			February 18, 2022	
ICEY	341 (PS4)	Fantablade	Action, hack and slash	May 8, 2020	
Iconoclasts	209 (Vita) 210 (PS4) 025 (Switch)	Joakim Sandberg	Action	January 18, 2019	
Ikenfell	426 (PS4)			September 24, 2021	
Illusion of L'Phalcia	320 (PS4)	Exe-Create	Role-playing	January 3, 2020	
Indigo Prophecy	331 (PS4)			April 3, 2021	
The Infectious Madness of Doctor Dekker	266 (PS4)			May 17, 2019	
Infernax	Distro (Switch, PS4)	Berzerk Studio / The Arcade Crew		November 30, 2021	
Infliction: Extended Cut	416 (PS4) 009 (PS5)			July 23, 2021	
Ion Fury	Distro (Switch, PS4)	3D Realms		October 13, 2020	
Iron Crypticle	151 (PS4)	Confused Pelican	Twin-stick shooter	June 8, 2018	
Jak and Daxter: The Precursor Legacy	184 (PS4)	Naughty Dog	Platform	December 7, 2018	
Jak II	212 (PS4)	Naughty Dog	Platform	January 25, 2019	
Jak 3	258 (PS4)	Naughty Dog	Platform	April 26, 2019	
Jak X: Combat Racing	292 (PS4)	Naughty Dog	Racing	November 15, 2019	
Jay and Silent Bob: Mall Brawl	Distro (NES) 420 (PS4)	Interbang Entertainment, Spoony Bard Productions	Beat 'em up	September 6, 2019 (NES) June 26, 2020 (Switch) April 20, 2021 (PS4)	
John Romero's Sigil		John Romero	Megawad	December 11, 2018	
Jotun: Valhalla Edition	076 (PS4)	Thunder Lotus Games	Action-adventure	July 14, 2017	
Jumanji: The Video Game	Distro (Switch, PS4, Xbox One)	Outright Games		October 29, 2019	
Jupiter & Mars	308 (PSVR)			December 6, 2019	
Kao the Kangaroo	Distro (Switch, PS4, PS5)	Tate Multimedia		May 24, 2022	
Katana Zero					
Kero Blaster	130 (PS4)	Studio Pixel	Action	March 16, 2018	
Kids on Site: Hard Hat Edition	457 (PS4)			April 1, 2022	
Kill the Bad Guy	132 (PS4)	Exkee	Puzzle	March 30, 2018	
The King of Fighters 2000	386 (PS4)			January 29, 2021	
The King of Fighters '97: Global Match	204 (PS4) 205 (Vita)			February 22, 2019	
The King of Fighters '98: Ultimate Match	344 (PS4)			May 22, 2020	
The King of Fighters: The Orochi Saga	393 (PS4)			March 19, 2021	
Kingdom: New Lands	153 (PS4) 007 (Switch)	Thomas van den Berg	Strategy	June 22, 2018 (PS4); July 6, 2018 (Switch)	
Kira Kira Star Night DX	Distro (NES)			March 19, 2021	
Knights and Bikes	317 (PS4)			December 20, 2019	
Koihime Enbu RyoRaiRai	206 (PS4)			February 22, 2019	
Kombinera	480 (PS4) 037 (PS5)			September 30, 2022	
Konami Arcade Classics Collection					
Kubo	Distro (NES)			April 22, 2022	
Kunai	Distro (Switch)	The Arcade Crew		July 8, 2020	
La-Mulana EX	003 (Vita)	Pygmy Studio	Shoot 'em up	November 10, 2017	
Lair of the Clockwork God	437 (PS4)			December 31, 2021	
The Last Blade 2	358 (PS4)			August 21, 2020	
Late Shift	178 (PS4)	Ctrl Movie Ltd	Adventure, interactive movie	August 10, 2018	
LawBreakers	Distro (PS4)	Boss Key Productions	First-person shooter	June 30, 2017; August 4, 2017 (PS4)	
Layers of Fear	181 (PS4) Distro (Switch)	Bloober Team	Psychological horror	October 5, 2018	
Legend of the Tetrarchs	324 (PS4)	Hit Point Co. Ltd.	Role-playing	January 31, 2020	
Lethal League	126 (PS4)	Team Reptile	Fighting	March 9, 2018	
Liege Dragon	460 (PS4) 024 (PS5)			May 13, 2022	
Lifeless Planet	316 (PS4)			December 6, 2019	
Light Tracer	218 (PSVR)			February 13, 2019	
Lili: Child of Geos	077 (PS4)	Panic Button	Action-adventure	August 18, 2017	
Little Goody Two Shoes	? (PS5), ? (Switch)	AstralShiftPro	Role-playing	May 17, 2026	
A Little Golf Journey	Distro (Switch)	Playtonic Games		January 18, 2022	
Little Witch Academia: VR Broom Racing	415 (PSVR)			July 16, 2021	
London Detective Mysteria	229 (Vita)			May 31, 2019	
Lone Survivor: The Director's Cut	030 (PS4) 031 (Vita)	Superflat Games	Survival horror	December 30, 2016	
Lost Sea	012 (PS4)	Eastasiasoft	Adventure	July 4, 2016	
Lovers in a Dangerous Spacetime	Distro (Switch, PS4)				
Lumines Remastered	201 (PS4) 027 (Switch)	Enhance Games	Puzzle	April 26, 2019 (PS4)	
Lunark	184 (Switch)	Canari Games	Platform		
Mages of Mystralia	187 (PS4)	Borealys Games	Action-adventure	October 19, 2018	
Magicka 2	139 (PS4)	Pieces Interactive	Action-adventure	July 6, 2018	
Maid of Sker	002 (PS5)			June 4, 2021	
Marenian Tavern Story	305 (PS4)			October 18, 2019	
Martha is Dead	Distro (PS4, PS5)	Wired Productions		February 8, 2022	
Mary Skelter 2	Distro (Switch)	Idea Factory		May 21, 2021	
Mecho Tales	087 (Vita) 088 (PS4)	Arcade Distillery	Platform	January 1, 2018	
Mega Man: The Wily Wars		Retro-Bit Publishing			
Megadimension Neptunia VII		Idea Factory			
Mercenaries Blaze		Circle Ent. / PM Studios			
Mercenaries Wings		PM Studios			
Mercenary Kings: Reloaded Edition	274 (PS4) 002 (Switch)	Tribute Games	Shoot 'em up	May 7, 2018 (Switch) June 28, 2019 (PS4)	
Metal Masters	Distro (Game Boy)			April 23, 2021	
Metal Slug 3	248 (Vita) 285 (PS4)	SNK	Run-and-gun	August 9, 2019	
Metal Slug Anthology	364 (PS4)			September 18, 2020	
Metal Slug XX	352 (PS4)			June 26, 2020	
Metal Storm		Retro-Bit			
The Metronomicon: Slay the Dance Floor	124 (PS4)	Puuba	Rhythm, role-playing	February 23, 2018	
Miden Tower	407 (PS4)			June 25, 2021	
Mighty Goose	478 (PS4) 036 (PS5)	Playism		October 7, 2022	
Mighty Gunvolt Burst		Inti Creates	Platformer	August 28, 2020	
Mighty Switch Force!: Collection	322 (PS4) 060 (Switch)	WayForward Technologies	Puzzle, platform	January 17, 2020 (PS4)	
Minit					
Missile Command	Distro (Atari 2600)			June 28, 2022	
The Missing: J.J. Macfield and the Island of Memories	323 (PS4) 061 (Switch)	White Owls Inc.	Puzzle, platform	January 31, 2020 (PS4)	
Mitsurugi Kamui Hikae	049 (PS4)	Zenith Blue	Action	March 31, 2017	
Moero Chronicle Hyper					
Momodora: Reverie Under the Moonlight	133 (PS4) 037 (Switch)	Bombservice	Metroidvania	March 30, 2018 (PS4) June 7, 2019 (Switch)	
Monkey Island 2 Special Edition: LeChuck's Revenge		LucasArts	Point-and-click adventure	TBD	
Monochrome Order	383 (PS4)			January 8, 2021	
Monster Boy and the Cursed Kingdom					
Monster Sanctuary	438 (PS4)			Decent 17, 2021	
Monster Viator	404 (PS4)			May 21, 2021	
Mother Russia Bleeds					
Ms. Splosion Man	047 (Switch)	Twisted Pixel Games	Platform	September 27, 2019	
The Mummy Demastered	372 (PS4)	WayForward	Metroidvania	October 23, 2020	
Mushihimesama					
MUSYNX	154 (PS4) 155 (Vita)	PM Studios, I-Inferno	Rhythm	June 22, 2018	
Mutant Blobs Attack!!	222 (Vita)	DrinkBox Studios	Platform	June 14, 2019	
Mutant Mudds Collection					
Mutant Mudds Deluxe	053 (Vita) 054 (PS4)	Renegade Kid	Action, platform	May 12, 2017	
Mutant Mudds Super Challenge	055 (Vita) 056 (PS4)	Renegade Kid	Action, platform	May 12, 2017	
My Friend Pedro					
Mystery Chronicle: One Way Heroics	020 (PS4) 021 (Vita)	Spike Chunsoft	Action role-playing	September 30, 2016	
Mystik Belle	321 (PS4)	Last Dimension	Platform	January 17, 2020	
Mythic Ocean					
N++	078 (PS4)	Metanet Software	Puzzle, platform	August 18, 2017	
Narcissu: 10th Anniversary					
Narcosis	179 (PS4)	Honor Code, Inc.	Horror, adventure	September 7, 2018	
Narita Boy	436 (PS4)			November 12, 2021	
NEOGEO Pocket Selection Vol. 1		SNK Corporation	Fighting	April 22, 2021	
Neon Abyss		Team17			
Neon City Riders	359 (PS4)			August 21, 2020	
Neonwall	211 (PSVR)	Norain Games	Rail shooter	January 9, 2019	
NeuroVoider	075 (PS4) 171 (Vita)	Flying Oak Games	Shooter	July 21, 2017 (PS4); January 4, 2019 (Vita)	
Neverending Nightmares	363 (PS4)			September 4, 2020	
Nex Machina	090 (PS4)	Housemarque	Shoot 'em up	November 10, 2017	
Night Book	454 (PS4)			April 8, 2022	
Night in the Woods	493 (PS4)	Finji	Adventure	2023	
Night Trap	074 (PS4) 193 (Vita) 008 (Switch) Distro (Sega 32X) Distro (Sega CD) 027 (PS5)	Screaming Villains	Interactive movie	August 11, 2017 (PS4) November 2, 2018 (Vita); July 20, 2018 (Switch) January 22, 2021 (Sega 32X, Sega CD) July 22, 2022 (PS5)	
Nine Witches: Family Disruption	427 (PS4)			October 8, 2021	
No More Heroes		Grasshopper Manufacture	Hack and slash	October 28, 2020	
No More Heroes 2: Desperate Struggle		Grasshopper Manufacture	Hack and slash	October 28, 2020	
Nova-111	045 (Vita) (046 PS4)	Funktronic Labs	Adventure	April 28, 2017	
Nuclear Throne		Vlambeer	Roguelike	TBD	
Nurse Love Addiction	123 (Vita)	Kogado Studio	Visual novel	March 16, 2018	
Nurse Love Obsession	Distro (Switch)			February 25, 2020	
Nurse Love Syndrome	233 (Vita)			April 19, 2019	
Observer	162 (PS4)	Bloober Team	Horror	July 6, 2018	
Ocean's Heart	180 (Switch)	Nordcurrent	Action role-playing	2023	
Oceanhorn		FDG Entertainment			
Oceanhorn 2		FDG Entertainment			
Oceanhorn: Monster of Uncharted Seas	069 (Vita) 070 (PS4)	Cornfox & Bros.	Action-adventure, role-playing	July 28, 2017	
Octodad: Dadliest Catch	010 (PS4) 011 (Vita)	Young Horses	Adventure	June 19, 2016	
Oddworld: Abe's Origins	Distro (PC)			December 20, 2019	
Oddworld: Munch's Oddysee HD	119 (Vita)	Just Add Water	Action-adventure	February 23, 2018	
Oddworld: New 'n' Tasty!	004 (PS4) 005 (Vita) 270 (PS3)	Just Add Water	Cinematic platform	April 25, 2016 (PS4, Vita) June 14, 2019 (PS3)	
Oddworld: Stranger's Wrath HD	029 (Vita) 244 (PS3)	Just Add Water	Action-adventure	December 16, 2016 (Vita) February's 15, 2019 (PS3)	
One Step From Eden	417 (PS4)			September 10, 2021	
Organ Trail: Complete Edition	120 (PS4) 125 (Vita)	The Men Who Wear Many Hats	Survival horror	March 16, 2018	
Othercide		Focus Entertainment			
Outbreak Collection	413 (PS4)	Dead Drop Studios	Horror	July 16, 2021	
Outbreak: Contagious Memories	484 (PS4) 040 (PS5)	Dead Drop Studios		October 28, 2022	
Outer Wilds	348 (PS4)			June 18, 2020	
Outlast 2	018 (Switch)	Red Barrels	Survival horror	October 29, 2018	
Outlast Bundle of Terror	017 (Switch)	Red Barrels	Survival horror	October 29, 2018	
Oxenfree	037 (PS4) 010 (Switch)	School Studio	Adventure	January 27, 2017 (PS4); August 3, 2018 (Switch)	
Pang Adventures	047 (PS4)	PastaGames	Arcade	March 31, 2017	
Panzer Dragoon	377 (PS4)	Sega	Rail shooter	March 27, 2020 (Switch) December 18, 2020 (PS4)	
Panzer Paladin		Tribute Games			
Paper Beast	384 (PSVR)			January 8, 2021	
Papers, Please	224 (Vita)	3909	Simulation	July 24, 2020	
Pathway	124 (Switch)			October 8, 2021	
Penny's Big Breakaway	(Switch) (Xbox) (PS5)	Evening Star	3D platformer	February 2025	
Persona 3 Portable	213 (Switch) 537 (PS4) 9 (Xbox)	Atlus	Role-playing, social simulation	September 29, 2023	
Persona 4 Golden	214 (Switch) 538 (PS4) 11 (Xbox)	Atlus	Role-playing, social simulation	October 27, 2023	
Petadachi					
Phantom Breaker: Battle Grounds - Overdrive	164 (PS4) 165 (Vita)	Mages Inc.	Beat 'em up	August 10, 2018	
Phantom Breaker: Omnia	452 (PS4)			March 11, 2022	
Phobos Dere .GB	Distro (Game Boy)			August 26, 2022	
Pig Eat Ball	338 (PS4)			April 24, 2020	
Pikuniku		Special Reserve Games			
Pix the Cat	226 (Vita) 278 (PS4)	Pastagames	Puzzle	June 21, 2019	
Pixel Gear	134 (PSVR)	Oasis Games	Shoot 'em up	March 21, 2018	
PixelJunk Eden 2		Q-Games			
PixelJunk Monsters 2	150 (PS4) 004 (Switch)	Q-Games Ltd.	Tower defense	June 1, 2018 (PS4)	
Plague Road	071 (Vita) 072 (PS4)	Arcade Distillery	Roguelike, turn-based strategy	July 28, 2017	
Planet of the Apes: Lost Frontier	288 (PS4)			September 13, 2019	
Plumbers Don't Wear Ties		United Pixtures	Visual novel	2022	
Polybius	307 (PSVR)			November 8, 2019	
Postal Redux		MB Games			
Power Rangers: Battle for the Grid	276 (PS4) 038 (Switch)	nWay Games	Fighting	June 10, 2019 (PS4)	
Powerslave: Exhumed					
Prison Boss VR	257 (PSVR)			April 24, 2019	
Prize Fighter: Heavyweight Edition					
Project Lux	253 (PSVR)			March 27, 2019	
Project Warlock	394 (PS4)			April 2, 2021	
Proteus	219 (Vita)	Twisted Tree Games	Exploration	January 18, 2019	
Psychonauts	271 (PS4)			June 7, 2019	
Pumpkin Jack	(PS5) (Switch)	Headup Games	Action-adventure	March 2025	
Quake	419 (PS4) 014 (PS5)			August 27, 2021 (PS4) October 15, 2021	
Rabi-Ribi	195 (Vita) 196 (PS4)	Cre-Spirit	Action-adventure	November 9, 2018	
Race the Sun	198 (PSVR) 199 (Vita)	Flippfly	Endless running game	November 23, 2018	
Radiant Silvergun					
Raiden IV x Mikado Remix & Raiden V Dual Pack	Distro (Switch)			June 21, 2022	
Rain World	203 (PS4)	Videocult	Survival game	December 21, 2018	
Rainbow Moon	015 (Vita) 016 (PS4)	SideQuest Studios	Tactical role-playing	August 19, 2016	
Ray Gigant	050 (Vita)	Experience Inc.	Role-playing	April 14, 2017	
realMyst: Masterpiece Edition	063 (Switch)	Cyan	Puzzle, adventure	February 28, 2020	
Red Faction	281 (PS4)	THQ Nordic	First-person shooter	July 12, 2019	
Red Matter	282 (PSVR)			July 17, 2019	
Redout: Space Assault	434 (PS4)			November 5, 2021	
Regions of Ruin		Jandusoft			
Rendering Ranger R2	Distro (SNES)			August 5, 2022	
République: Anniversary Edition	409 (PSVR)	Camouflaj	Stealth, action-adventure	July 1, 2021 10 March 2022	
The Rescue of Princess Blobette	Distro (Game Boy)			January 21, 2022	
Retromania Wrestling					
Return of the Ninja	Distro (Game Boy Color)			November 27, 2020	
Return of the Obra Dinn	355 (PS4)	Lucas Pope	Puzzle	July 24, 2020	
Revenant Dogma	246 (Vita) 293 (PS4)	Exe Create Inc., Kemco	Role-playing	August 30, 2019	
Revenant Saga	110 (PS4) 111 (Vita)	Exe Create Inc.	Role-playing	February 23, 2018	
Revenge of the Bird King					
Risk of Rain	057 (Vita) 058 (PS4)	Hopoo Games	Action, platform	May 26, 2017	
Rivals of Ather Definitive Edition		Dan Fornace	Fighting	December 11, 2020	
Rive	068 (PS4)	Two Tribes	Platform	July 7, 2017	
River City Girls	291 (PS4) 010 (PS5) 045 (Switch)	WayForward	Beat 'em up	August 30, 2019 (PS4) August 13, 2021 (PS5)	
River City Girls 2	476 (PS4) 034 (PS5) 161 (Switch)	WayForward	Beat 'em up	September 9, 2022	
River City Girls Zero	444 (PS4) 018 (PS5) 139 (Switch)	WayForward	Beat 'em up	January 28, 2022	
River City Melee	103 (P)	Arc System Works	Beat 'em up	December 8, 2017	
Riverbond		Cococucumber			
Rock Boshers DX	096 (Vita) 099 (PS4)	Tikipod	Shoot 'em up	January 5, 2018	
Rocketbirds: Hardboiled Chicken	238 (Vita) 391 (PS4)	Ratloop	Action, platform	November 1, 2019 (Vita) February 26, 2021 (PS4)	
Rocketbirds 2: Evolution	239 (PS4)	Ratloop	Action, platform	December 27, 2019	
Rogue Legacy	277 (PS4) 040 (Switch)	Cellar Door Games	Roguelike, action, platform	July 19, 2019	
Rogue Legacy 2	240 (Switch)	Cellar Door Games	Roguelike, action, platform		
Roombo: First Blood	399 (PS4)			August 27, 2021	
RPGolf Legends		Kemco			
Ruiner		Special Reserve Games			
Ruinverse	473 (PS4) 032 (PS5)			August 12, 2022	
Runner2	043 (Vita) 044 (PS4)	Gaijin Games	Platform	March 17, 2017	
RWBY: Arrowfell	177 (Switch) 500 (PS4) 049 (PS5) 006 (Xbox)	WayForward	Action-adventure	2023	
RWBY: Grimm Eclipse Definitive Edition		Aspyr	Action, adventure	July 16, 2021	
Saboteur	Distro (Atari 2600)	Atari SA		May 10, 2022	
SacriFire					
Salt & Sanctuary	166 (PS4) 167 (Vita)	Ska Studios	Action role-playing	September 14, 2018	
Sam & Max: Beyond Time and Space					
Sam & Max Hit the Road Collector's Edition	Distro (PC)				
Sam & Max: Save The World	563 (PS4)	Skunkape	Adventure	December, 2024	
Sam & Max: This Time It's Virtual	459 (PSVR)			May 6, 2022	
Samurai Jack: Battle Through Time	356 (PS4)	Soleil Ltd.	Action-adventure, hack and slash	August 14, 2020	
Samurai Shodown NeoGeo Collection		SNK			
Samurai Shodown V	328 (PS4)			March 13, 2020	
Samurai Shodown VI	329 (PS4)			March 13, 2020	
Saturday Morning RPG	002 (PS4) 003 (Vita) 005 (Switch)	Mighty Rabbit Studios	Role-playing	January 2, 2016 (PS4/Vita); June 8, 2018 (Switch)	
Save Me Mr Tako: Definitive Edition	147 (Switch) 559 (PS4)				
S.C.A.T.: Special Cybernetic Attack Team	Distro (NES)			January 8, 2021	
Scott Pilgrim vs. The World: The Game - Complete Edition	382 (PS4)	Ubisoft	Beat 'em up	January 15, 2021	
Screencheat	114 (PS4)	Samurai Punk	First-person shooter	January 19, 2018	
Sea of Solitude: The Director's Cut		Quantic Dream			
The Secret of Monkey Island	Distro (Sega CD)	LucasArts	Point-and-click adventure	February 28, 2020	
The Secret of Monkey Island: Special Edition		LucasArts	Point-and-click adventure	TBD	
Seek Hearts	351 (PS4)			August 7, 2020	
Senko no Ronde 2	098 (PS4)	G.rev Ltd.	Fighting, shooter	April 13, 2018	
Senran Kagura 2: Deep Crimson		Marvelous			
Senran Kagura Bon Appetit! - Full Course	163 (Vita)	Meteorise	Rhythm	August 24, 2018	
Senran Kagura Burst Re:Newal					
Senran Kagura Peach Ball					
Senran Kagura Reflexions		Marvelous			
Sephirothic Stories	326 (PS4)	Exe-Create	Role-playing	February 14, 2020	
Serial Cleaner	299 (PS4)			September 27, 2019	
Shadow Complex Remastered	017 (PS4)	Chair Entertainment, Epic Games	Metroidvania	August 19, 2016	
Shadow Man Remastered	439 (PS4)			February 25, 2022	
Shadow of the Ninja	Distro (NES)			November 27, 2020	
Shadow Warrior Collection		Special Reserve Games			
Shadowgate	333 (PS4)	ICOM Simulations	Adventure	March 27, 2020	
Shadowrun Trilogy	481 (PS4) 038 (PS5)			September 30, 2022	
Shadows of Adam		PM Studios			
Shady Part of Me	Distro (Switch, PS4)	Douze Dixièmes, Focus Entertainment	Puzzle-platform	2023	
Shantae	468 (PS4) Distro (Game Boy Color) 003 (PS5)	WayForward	Platformer	September 11, 2020 (PS4, Game Boy Color) August 26, 2022 (PS5)	
Shantae Advance: Risky Revolution		WayForward	Platform	April 21, 2025 (Game Boy Advance) August 19, 2025 (Switch, PS4, PS5, Xbox One, Xbox Series X/S)	
Shantae and the Pirate's Curse	025 (PS4) 005 (PS5)	WayForward Technologies	Platform, Metroidvania	October 28, 2016 (PS4); December 21, 2018 (Switch) August 6, 2021 (PS5)	
Shantae and the Seven Sirens	343 (PS4) 007 (PS5)	WayForward	Platformer	May 15, 2020 (PS4) April 22, 2022 (PS5)	
Shantae: Half-Genie Hero	006 (PS5)	Xseed Games		August 20, 2021	
Shantae: Risky's Revenge - Director's Cut	024 (PS4) 084 (Switch) 004 (PS5)	WayForward Technologies	Platform, Metroidvania	October 28, 2016 (PS4) September 11, 2020 (Switch) July 9, 2021 (PS5)	
The Shapeshifting Detective	301 (PS4)			October 11, 2019	
Sheepo	467 (PS4) 028 (PS5) Distro (Switch)	Top Hat Studios		July 15, 2022	
Shenmue III (collector's edition only)	Distro (PS4)	Ys Net, Deep Silver	Action-adventure	November 19, 2019	
Shiren The Wanderer		Spike Chunsoft			
The Silver Case HD Remaster		Grasshopper Manufacture	Visual novel	October 6, 2016	(Note: The Silver Case HD Remaster followed a pre-order model, with reserves beginning on October 4, 2016 and closing on October 20, 2016.)
Simulacra	396 (PS4)			April 9, 2021	
Sir Lovelot	422 (PS4) 013 (PS5)			September 10, 2021	
Siralim	137 (Vita) 138 (PS4)	Thylacine Studios	Role-playing, roguelike	May 4, 2018	
Siralim 2	191 (Vita) 192 (PS4)	Thylacine Studios	Turn-based role-playing	November 2, 2018	
Siralim 3	297 (PS4)			September 20, 2019	
Skatebird					
Skelattack	176 (Switch) 499 (PS4)	Ukuza Inc., Konami	Platform	2023	
Skullgirls 2nd Encore	097 (PS4) 100 (Vita)	Reverge Labs	Fighting	October 31, 2016	
Sky Force Anniversary	115 (Vita) 116 (PS4)	Infinite Dreams Inc.	Shoot 'em up	January 26, 2018	
Slime-san: Superslime Edition	284 (PS4) 006 (Switch)	Fabraz	Action, platform	June 22, 2018 (PS4)	
SmuggleCraft	402 (PS4)			April 30, 2021	
Snow Bros. Nick & Tom Special		Clear River Games			
Snow Bros. Wonderland	(Switch) (PS 5)	Clear River Games	Action, platform	January 2025	
Sol Cresta	447 (PS4)			February 4, 2022	
Söldner-X 2: Final Prototype	013 (Vita)	SideQuest Studios	Shoot 'em up	July 29, 2016	
Song in the Smoke	479 (PSVR)			October 21, 2022	
Song of Horror		Raiser Games			
Space Channel 5 VR	353 (PSVR)			July 31, 2020	
Spanky's Quest	Distro (Game Boy)			March 5, 2021	
Spelunky	220 (PS4) 221 (Vita)			February 8, 2019	
Spidersaurs	495 (PS4) 046 (PS5)			2023	
Splasher	152 (PS4)	Splashteam	Platform	June 8, 2018	
Star Wars	Distro (Game Boy) Distro (NES)	LucasArts, Ubisoft	Action, platform	June 28, 2019	
Star Wars: Bounty Hunter	273 (PS4)	LucasArts	Action	June 28, 2019	
Star Wars: Dark Forces		LucasArts	Action, first-person shooter	TBD	
Star Wars: The Empire Strikes Back	Distro (Game Boy, NES)	LucasArts, Acclaim Studios Salt Lake City	Action platformer	July 26, 2019	
Star Wars Episode I: Racer	Distro (N64) 350 (PS4)	LucasArts	Racing	October 18, 2019 (N64) July 10, 2020 (PS4)	
Star Wars: The Force Unleashed					
Star Wars Jedi Knight: Dark Forces II		LucasArts	Action, first-person shooter	TBD	
Star Wars Jedi Knight: Jedi Academy	337 (PS4)	LucasArts, Raven Software	Action	April 24, 2020	
Star Wars Jedi Knight II: Jedi Outcast	336 (PS4)	LucasArts, Raven Software	Action	April 24, 2020	
Star Wars: Knights of the Old Republic					
Star Wars: Knights of the Old Republic II					
Star Wars: Racer Revenge	290 (PS4)	LucasArts, THQ Nordic	Racing	October 18, 2019	
Star Wars: Rebel Assault	Distro (Sega CD)	LucasArts	Interactive movie, rail shooter	February 28, 2020	
Star Wars: Republic Commando	397 (PS4)			April 16, 2021	
Star Wars: Shadows of the Empire	Distro (N64)	LucasArts	Action	July 26, 2019	
Star Wars: TIE Fighter		LucasArts, Totally Games	Space simulator, shooting	TBD	
Star Wars: X-Wing		LucasArts	Space simulator, shooting	TBD	
Starflight 3					
StarHawk	Distro (Game Boy)			April 23, 2021	
Stealth Inc: A Clone in the Dark - Ultimate Edition	026 (PS4) 027 (Vita)	Curve Studios	Stealth	November 25, 2016	
SteamWorld Dig	094 (Vita)	Image & Form	Action-adventure	December 15, 2017	
SteamWorld Heist	095 (Vita)	Image & Form	Action-adventure	December 15, 2017	
Steel Assault	179 (Switch)	Zenovia Interactive	Action, platform	2023	
Stikbold	252 (PS4)			March 29, 2019	
Story of a Gladiator	388 (PS4)			February's 5, 2021	
Strafe					
Stranger Things 3: The Game	310 (PS4) 051 (Switch)	Bonus XP	Beat 'em up	November 1, 2019 (PS4)	
Streets of Rage 4	332 (PS4)	Dotemu, Lizardcube, Guard Crush Games	Beat 'em up	May 1, 2020	
Streets of Red		PM Studios			
Strife: Veteran Edition		Nightdive Studios			
Strikers Edge	268 (PS4)			May 17, 2019	
Summertime Madness	451 (PS4) 021 (PS5)			February 25, 2022	
Sundered	208 (PS4)	Thunder Lotus Games	Metroidvania	January 4, 2019	
Super Breakout		Atari Inc.			
Super ComboMan	280 (PS4)			July 12, 2019	
Super Daryl Deluxe	361 (PS4)			August 28, 2020	
Super GunWorld 2	106 (PS4)	M07 Games	Platform	November 24, 2017	
Super Hydorah	129 (PS4) 149 (Vita)	Locomalito	Shoot 'em up	March 9, 2018 (PS4); June 8, 2018 (Vita)	
Super Meat Boy	223 (Vita) 410 (PS4) 028 (Switch)	Team Meat	Platform	January 10, 2019 (Switch) July 30, 2021 (Vita, PS4)	
Super Meat Boy Forever	411 (PS4)	Team Meat	Platform	July 30, 2021 (PS4)	
Super Mutant Alien Assault	247 (Vita)	Fellow Traveller, Cybernate	Action, platform, roguelike	January 2019 (PS4) July 12, 2019 (Vita)	
Super Sami Roll		X Plus			
SuperEpic: The Entertainment War		PM Studios			
Superhot					
SuperMash	367 (PS4)			September 18, 2020	
Supra Land		Humble Games			
The Swapper	038 (PS4) 039 (Vita)	Facepalm Games	Puzzle-platform	February 3, 2017	
The Swindle	040 (PS4) 041 (Vita)	Size Five Games	Stealth game	February 17, 2017	
Sword of the Necromancer					
Swordsman VR	462 (PSVR)			May 20, 2022	
Syd of Valis					
Tacoma	213 (PS4)			January 25, 2019	
Tail Gator	Distro (Game Boy)			July 9, 2021	
The TakeOver	110 (Switch) 408 (PS4)			May 20, 2020 (Switch) June 25, 2021 (PS4)	
Teenage Mutant Ninja Turtles: Shredder's Revenge		DotEmu			
Terminator: Resistance Enhanced		Reef Entertainment			
Teslagrad					
Tetris Effect: Connected	Distro (PSVR)			November 9, 2018 (PS4)	
Tharsis	275 (PS4)	Choice Provisions	Strategy	May 24, 2019	
Thea: The Awakening		Monster Couch			
There Is No Game					
Thimbleweed Park	131 (PS4) 001 (Switch)	Terrible Toybox	Adventure	March 30, 2018	
Thomas Was Alone	022 (PS4) 023 (Vita)	Mike Bithell	Puzzle, platform	September 30, 2016	
Those Who Remain		Wired Productions			
Thumper	172 (PS4) 009 (Switch)	Drool	Rhythm game	July 20, 2018 (PS4)	
Timespinner	256 (PS4) 042 (Switch)	Lunar Ray Games	Metroivania	August 2, 2019 (PS4)	
Tiny Metal Ultimate	064 (Switch)	Area 35	Turn-based strategy	March 13, 2020	
Tiny Troopers: Global Ops		Epiphany Games, Kukouri Mobile Entertainment	Shooter		
To The Moon					
To the Top	188 (PSVR)	Electric Hat Games	Action, platform	November 7, 2018	
ToeJam & Earl: Back in the Groove	243 (PS4) 029 (Switch)	HumaNature Studios	Action, platform	February 15, 2019 (PS4)	
Toki Tori	Distro (Game Boy Color)			December 10, 2021	
Tokyo Chronus	303 (PSVR)			October 30, 2019	
Toto Temple Deluxe	148 (PS4)	Juicy Beast	Action	May 18, 2018	
Towerfall					
The Town of Light					
Transistor	265 (PS4) 039 (Switch)	Supergiant Games	Action role-playing, strategy	July 5, 2019 (PS4)	
Treasures of the Aegean		Numskull Games			
Trover Saves the Universe					
Truxton		Toaplan			
Turok	43 (Switch) 423 (PS4)	Nightdive Studios	Action	August 30, 2019 (Switch) September 17, 2021 (PS4)	
Turok 2: Seeds of Evil	44 (Switch) 424 (PS4)	Nightdive Studios	Action	August 30, 2019 (Switch) September 17, 2021 (PS4)	
Typoman	135 (PS4)	Brainseed Factory	Puzzle, platform	April 13, 2018 (Vita) November 29, 2019 (PS4)	
Undead Darlings		Sekai Games			
Undercover Cops		Irem			
Undermine	474 (PS4)			August 5, 2022	
Unpacking		Humble Games			
Unsighted	464 (PS4)			May 27, 2022	
VA-11 HALL-A	160 (Vita) 314 (PS4) 053 (Switch)	Sukeban Games	Visual novel	June 29, 2018	
Valis III					
Valis: The Fantasm Soldier					
Valis: The Fantasm Soldier Collection II		Retro-Bit			
Valkyria Chronicles Remastered	254 (Switch)	Sega	Tactical-role-playing	January 2025	
Vengeful Guardian: Moonrider	Distro (Switch, PS4)	JoyMasher, The Arcade Crew	Platform	2023	
Victor Vran		Wired Productions			
Vitamin Connection	059 (Switch)	WayForward Technologies	Action-adventure	January 17, 2020	
Volume	028 (Vita) 140 (PS4)	Mike Bithell	Stealth	November 11, 2016 (Vita); May 4, 2018 (PS4)	
Vostok Inc		Wired Productions			
Wandersong	300 (PS4) 049 (Switch)	Greg Lobanov	Puzzle	October 11, 2019 (PS4)	
Warlords		Atari Inc.			
West of Dead: Path of the Crow		PM Studios			
West of Loathing	011 (Switch)	Asymmetric Publications	Role-playing	August 17, 2018	
Where The Water Tastes Like Wine		PM Studios			
Who Pressed Mute on Uncle Marcus?	494 (PS4)			2023	
Windjammers	091 (Vita) 092 (PS4) 022 (Switch)	DotEmu	Sports game	December 1, 2017 (VIta, PS4); January 4, 2019 (Switch)	
Windjammers 2					
Winds & Leaves	456 (PSVR)			April 15, 2022	
Witch n' Wiz	Distro (NES)			November 12, 2021	
Wizard of Legend	347 (PS4)	Contingent99	Roguelike, dungeon crawler	June 12, 2020	
Wizards of Brandel	401 (PS4)			April 23, 2021	
Wonder Boy: The Dragon's Trap	073 (PS4)	Lizardcube	Action, platform	August 4, 2017	
World End Economica					
Worms	Distro (Game Boy, Genesis, SNES)			March 11, 2022	
Worms Armageddon	Distro (Game Boy Color, N64)			November 5, 2021	
Worse Than Death	340 (PS4)			May 1, 2020	
Xenon Valkyrie+	156 (PS4) 157 (Vita)	Diabolical Mind	Roguelike	June 29, 2018	
Xeodrifter	008 (PS4) 009 (Vita)	Renegade Kid	Metroidvania	July 4, 2016	
Xtreme Sports					
Yaga	357 (PS4)			August 14, 2020	
Yakuza 0	(PS4) (Xbox)	Sega	Action, adventure	March 2025	
Yakuza Kiwami	(Switch) (PS4) (Xbox)	Sega	Action, adventure	March 2025	
Yars' Return		Atari Inc.			
Yesterday Origins	107 (PS4)	Pendulo Studios	Adventure	January 5, 2018	
YIIK: A Postmodern RPG		Ackk Studios	Role-playing	TBD	
Yooka-Laylee	013 (Switch)	Playtonic Games	Action, platform	September 7, 2018	
Young Souls		The Arcade Crew			
Ys Origin	081 (Vita) 082 (PS4)	DotEmu	Action role-playing	August 25, 2017	
Yumeutsutsu Re:Master		Degica			
Zero Wing	Distro (Genesis)	Toaplan			
Zombies Ate My Neighbors	Distro (Genesis, SNES)			June 18, 2021	
Zombies Ate My Neighbors & Ghoul Patrol	414 (PS4) 112 (Switch)	Lucasfilm Games	Run and gun, shoot 'em up	June 18, 2021	
