= Marvel Cosmic Invasion =

2025 video game

- Developer: Tribute Games
- Publisher: Dotemu
- Director: Frédéric Gémus
- Producer: Rémi Lavoie
- Designer: Kevin Chiasson
- Programmer: Jean-François Major
- Artist: Adam J. Marin
- Writer: Yannick Belzil
- Composer: Tee Lopes
- Platforms: Linux; Nintendo Switch; Nintendo Switch 2; PlayStation 4; PlayStation 5; Windows; Xbox Series X/S
- Release: December 1, 2025
- Genre: Beat 'em up
- Modes: Single-player, multiplayer

Marvel Cosmic Invasion is a beat 'em up game developed by Tribute Games and published by Dotemu. The game was released for Linux, Nintendo Switch, Nintendo Switch 2, PlayStation 4, PlayStation 5, Windows, and Xbox Series X/S on December 1, 2025.

== Gameplay ==
In this screenshot, the player, with Iron Man and Storm as their playable characters, is defeating enemies.

Marvel Cosmic Invasion is an arcade-style side-scrolling beat 'em up video game with a pixelated artstyle. In the game, players control a variety of Marvel superheroes who must battle hordes of enemies in locations ranging from New York City to the Negative Zone to thwart the villain Annihilus' cosmic invasion. The game features both single-player and multiplayer modes, allowing players to team up with three other players in cooperative gameplay. Each player has to select two characters, and they can switch between the two characters anytime during combat.

At launch, the game featured a roster of 15 characters. The starting characters are Beta Ray Bill, Black Panther, Captain America, Cosmic Ghost Rider, Iron Man, Nova, Rocket Raccoon, She-Hulk, Spider-Man, Storm and Wolverine, while Phyla-Vell, Phoenix, Silver Surfer and Venom are unlocked as the story progresses. Cyclops and The Thing were added as paid DLC in an update on May 18, 2026. Doctor Doom and Invisible Woman were added on November 10, 2026, as part of The Siege of Castle Doom expansion.

Each hero has their distinct movement and combat abilities, though each has a primary, hero-specific attack, a regular melee attack, a defend mechanic (either a block or a dodge), and a screen-clearing special move that consumes "focus", gained through landing hits on enemies. They can also perform tag-team moves, which allow the hero character to summon the secondary character to perform a combo attack.

== Development and release ==
The game was developed by Tribute Games, the developer behind Teenage Mutant Ninja Turtles: Shredder's Revenge, and published by Dotemu. Both studios approached Marvel Games for the opportunity of developing a game set in the Marvel Universe. Marvel Games required the team to include 15 playable heroes at launch, leading the developers to assemble a roster that balanced widely popular characters with lesser-known ones. The visual and narrative style draws inspirations from the work of Jim Lee, John Byrne and Jack Kirby, and the team chose to adapt the Annihilation storyline because it had been unexplored in both video games and other media. Tribute Games described Cosmic Invasion as a "completely different game to build" when compared with Shredder's Revenge, as the characters featured in the game have very distinct movesets and abilities. As a result, it has a larger emphasis on crowd control.

Announced in March 2025, Marvel Cosmic Invasion was released for Linux, Nintendo Switch, Nintendo Switch 2, PlayStation 4, PlayStation 5, Windows, and Xbox Series X/S on December 1, 2025. A demo was released for PC on October 1, 2025. On April 17, 2026, Marvel Music released the Marvel Cosmic Invasion Original Video Game Soundtrack, a 23-track album by composer Tee Lopes.

A DLC expansion, entitled The Siege of Castle Doom, was released on November 10, 2026. It will feature an all new game mode alongside two new playable characters.

== Reception ==
Reception

Aggregate scores
Aggregator	Score
Metacritic	(PC) 81/100 (PS5) 80/100 (XSXS) 84/100 (NS2) 72/100
OpenCritic	85% recommend

Marvel Cosmic Invasion received "generally favorable" reviews according to review aggregator website Metacritic. OpenCritic reported that 85% of critics recommended the game.

Marvel Cosmic Invasion was the 18th most-downloaded title on PS5 in the United States and Canada through December 2025. The game debuted at 14th on the United Kingdom physical sales chart for the week ending 18 April 2026. By May 2026, Marvel Cosmic Invasion had over 1.5 million players.

The Academy of Interactive Arts & Sciences nominated Marvel Cosmic Invasion for Family Game of the Year at the 29th Annual D.I.C.E. Awards.
