= Paul Robertson (animator) =

Australian animator (born 1979)

Paul Robertson is an Australian animator known for his pixel art and animation. Born Paul Laurence Adelbert Garfield Robertson on 9 August 1979 in Geelong, Victoria, he was named after comedian Paul Lynde and the popular comic and cartoon character, Garfield the cat.

== Notable works ==
=== Videogame art ===
- The Invincible Iron Man (2002)
- Backyard Football (2002) (GBA version)
- Pitfall: The Lost Expedition (2003) (GBA version)
- Ice Nine (2003) (Map Artist)
- Action Man: Robot Atak (2004)
- Teenage Mutant Ninja Turtles: Battle for the City (2005) (Plug and Play game)
- Sigma Star Saga (2005)
- Barbie and the Magic of Pegasus (2005) (GBA version)
- Looney Tunes Double Pack (2005)
- Batman: Multiply, Divide and Conquer (2005) (Leapster)
- Number Raiders (2005) (Leapster)
- Word Chasers (2005) (Leapster)
- Letterpillar (2005) (Leapster)
- Justice League Heroes: The Flash (2006)
- X-Men: The Official Game (2006) (GBA version)
- American Dragon Jake Long: Rise of the Huntsclan! (2006)
- SpongeBob SquarePants: Creature from the Krusty Krab (2006) (Nintendo DS version)
- Barbie in the 12 Dancing Princesses (2006) (GBA and Nintendo DS versions)
- Unfabulous (2006)
- Contra 4 (2007)
- Drawn to Life (2007)
- Lock's Quest (2008)
- Hikkikomori Quest (2008)
- SpongeBob SquarePants: Fists of Foam (2008) (LeapFrog Diji)
- Drawn to Life: The Next Chapter (2009)
- Where the Wild Things Are (2009) (Nintendo DS version)
- Scott Pilgrim vs. the World: The Game (2010)
- Shantae: Risky's Revenge (2010)
- Aliens: Infestation (2011)
- Wizorb (2011)
- iCarly: Groovy Foodie! (2012)
- Scribblenauts Unlimited (2012)
- Adventure Time: Hey Ice King! Why'd You Steal Our Garbage?! (2012)
- Fez (2012)
- Shantae and the Pirate's Curse (2014)
- Mercenary Kings (2014)
- Curses 'N Chaos (2015)
- Teenage Mutant Ninja Turtles: Shredder's Revenge (2022)
- Scott Pilgrim EX (2026)

=== Short films ===
- Pirate Baby's Cabana Battle Street Fight 2006 (2006)
- Kings of Power 4 Billion% (2008)
- Super Dino Boys - Adult Swim (2015)
- Rick + Morty in the Eternal Nightmare Machine - Adult Swim (2021)
- Smiling Friends Employee Training Software Walkthrough - Adult Swim (2024)
- Jimmy and Baby (2024)
  - created with Michelle Larney
- A Goofy (16-Bit) Movie - The Walt Disney Company (2025)

=== Theatrical films ===
- Scott Pilgrim vs. the World (2010)

=== Television ===
- Gravity Falls - Fight Fighters (2012), Soos and the Real Girl (2014), and Weirdmageddon 1 & Weirdmageddon 3: Take Back The Falls (2016)
  - Characters animated: Rumble McSkirmish and .GIFfany
- Rick and Morty - Season 3 promo (2017)
- The Simpsons - Season 26 Episode 14, "My Fare Lady", Couch Gag (SIMPSONS PIXELS)
- Adventure Time - Main Title, "Diamonds and Lemons"
- Amphibia - 8-bit Theme Song Takeover (2020)
- Gameoverse - Pilot (2026)

=== Music videos ===
- Architecture in Helsinki - "Do the Whirlwind" (2005)
- Delta Heavy - "White Flag" (2016)
