= Scott Pilgrim EX =

2026 video game

- Developer: Tribute Games
- Publisher: Tribute Games
- Artist: Paul Robertson
- Writer: Bryan Lee O'Malley
- Composer: Anamanaguchi
- Series: Scott Pilgrim
- Platforms: Linux; Nintendo Switch; Nintendo Switch 2; PlayStation 4; PlayStation 5; Windows; Xbox One; Xbox Series X/S
- Release: March 3, 2026
- Genre: Beat 'em up

Scott Pilgrim EX is a side-scrolling beat 'em up video game developed and published by Tribute Games, under license from Universal Pictures. Based on the Scott Pilgrim graphic novel series created by Bryan Lee O'Malley, the game features an original story written by O'Malley, and takes place following the events of the 2023 Scott Pilgrim Takes Off anime, following the animated series not being renewed for a second season. The anime's co-creator, BenDavid Grabinski, acted as a creative consultant.

The game was released on March 3, 2026 to positive critical reception.

== Story ==
The game’s story takes place after the cliffhanger ending of the Netflix series Scott Pilgrim Takes Off, with a prequel comic to the video game being released by O'Malley to promote the game.

In the year 20XX, Toronto has been affected by a gang war between vegans, demons, and robots. As the conflict rages, the other band members of Sex Bob-omb are kidnapped by a mysterious robotic doppelgänger of Scott Pilgrim (dubbed Metal Scott) while practicing for their gig. When Ramona finds Scott, she calls for backup from Roxie, Lucas, Matthew, Gideon, and Robot-01 to help them search the city and rescue Scott's band mates.

== Gameplay ==
Scott Pilgrim EX is a side-scrolling beat 'em up in the style of classic arcade games, much like the 2010 Ubisoft game Scott Pilgrim vs. the World: The Game. Players are able to play as seven different characters, including Scott Pilgrim, Ramona Flowers, Roxie Richter, Lucas Lee, Matthew Patel, Gideon Graves, and Robot-01. Stephen Stills, Kim Pine, and Knives Chau are playable through the "Back in the Band" downloadable content.

Characters have an "ally" ability. This ability can be swapped between multiple options. The main point of the ally ability is summoning a character from the series to help you during the battle.

== Development ==
In an interview with Rolling Stone in November 2023, Bryan Lee O'Malley said of Scott Pilgrim Takes Off's future that Netflix was unlikely to renew the series for a second season, stating "I never say never, but right now, it seems like it would take about 50 different miracles simultaneously for another season to happen. So we'll see." He confirmed in November 2024 that the series would not continue on Netflix.

In an interview with CBR in February 2024, Mary Elizabeth Winstead and Ellen Wong expressed that they would be happy to reprise their characters in any future Scott Pilgrim adaption, including a hypothetical sequel series to Takes Off. Winstead added that "if that creative spark is back, I think we would all be ready to tackle it again." Consequently, O'Malley began developing a sequel video game to the Takes Off, which was officially unveiled in June 2025, during the annual Summer Game Fest,with the announcements of O'Malley and Grabinski's involvement. Paul Robertson, who served as the lead artist for Scott Pilgrim vs. the World: The Game, also returned for Scott Pilgrim EX. Chiptune-based rock band Anamanaguchi composed the game's soundtrack, returning to the franchise once again after previously scoring Scott Pilgrim vs. the World: The Game and Scott Pilgrim Takes Off.

Scott Pilgrim EX released on March 3, 2026. A downloadable content (DLC) pack, "Back in the Band", was released on August 27 and adds new playable and assist characters. A free "Coin-Op Chaos" update was released alongside the DLC, which adds an arcade mode to the game.

== Reception ==
Reception

Aggregate scores
| Aggregator | Score |
|---|---|
| Metacritic | 78/100 |
| OpenCritic | 78% recommend (Note: Based on 82 reviews) |

Review scores
| Publication | Score |
|---|---|
| Destructoid | 7/10 |
| IGN | 8/10 |
| PC Gamer (US) | 76/100 |
| Shacknews | 90/100 |
| Video Games Chronicle | 4/5 |

Scott Pilgrim EX received "generally favorable" reviews according to review aggregator website Metacritic. Fellow review aggregator OpenCritic assessed that the game received strong approval, being recommended by 78% of critics.
