= Panzer Paladin =

2020 video game

- Developer: Tribute Games
- Publisher: Tribute Games
- Designer: Jonathan Lavigne
- Programmers: Jean-François Major; Andrew G. Crowell; François Masse; Shengguang Guo
- Artists: Justin Cyr; Matthieu Godet; Derek Ung; Julian Adam Marin; Stéphane Boutin; David Liu; Flor Trevino
- Composers: Patrice Bourgeault; Powerglove (theme)
- Platforms: Windows; Nintendo Switch; PlayStation 4; Xbox One
- Release: Windows, Switch; July 21, 2020; PS4, Xbox One; June 13, 2024
- Genre: Platform
- Mode: Single-player

Panzer Paladin is a side-scrolling platformer developed and published by Tribute Games and released for Microsoft Windows through Steam and Nintendo Switch in July 2020. It was later released for PlayStation 4 and Xbox One in June 2024. The player assumes the role of a rescue service android named Flame who pilots a sentient power armor mecha named Grit as the two work together to stop extraterrestrial demonic invaders from conquering the Earth. The game draws inspiration from several NES-era titles including Zelda II: The Adventure of Link, Mega Man and Blaster Master.

== Gameplay ==
Panzer Paladin consists of 17 levels, during which the player takes control of either the slow but powerful Paladin mech Grit or the small but swift Squire pilot Flame. While commanding Grit, the player can pick up discarded melee weapons dropped by defeated enemies to use in battle against them. The combat mechanics include a high-versus-low attacking and blocking system (similar to Zelda II), along with a rock-paper-scissors style weapon triangle system that grants the player's weapons damage bonuses or reductions depending on the weapon used by the enemy.

The game implements a weapon durability system similar to Breath of the Wild where weapons will degrade and eventually break after enough uses, with some weapons being more durable than others. Every weapon also has a predetermined spell contained within them that the player can cast at any time by intentionally breaking the weapon, ranging from recovery and defensive spells to ranged or screen-clearing attacks. Weapons can also be thrown as projectiles at enemies to deal extra damage at the cost of instantly breaking them or be left at one of several pedestals scattered across each level to act as a checkpoint upon death.

Similar to Blaster Master, the player can eject from Grit at any time to play through levels as Flame. She is quick and small enough to fit through tight spaces, but she cannot pick up any weapons dropped by the enemies and has a significantly smaller health bar than Grit does. She wields a Castlevania-style laser whip that allows her to attack enemies at a distance, siphon energy from power tanks to replenish Grit's health and swing around on ring hooks to reach new areas. If Grit's health drops to zero, Flame will instantly be ejected from the mech and the player will be forced to play as her until they're able to find power tanks to restore Grit's health. Whenever Grit isn't being used, he will remain where he's left by the player until they either return to him later on or the player activates any of the teleportation pads scattered throughout each level to instantly teleport Grit to Flame's current location should the two get separated. Every level in the game is also designed to have Flame be able to traverse completely by herself if need be.

Stage progression is very similar to the Mega Man series, where each stage's boss is visible beforehand on the stage select screen and stages can be selected and completed in any order you wish (with some exceptions). Between missions, any unused weapons you have acquired can be converted into Spirit Points that can be used to increase Grit's maximum health once enough are collected. The game also implements a weapon customization system known as the "Blacksmith" where players can draw and create their own weapons to share with other players via the internet.

== Story ==
=== Characters ===
The story follows the exploits of Flame, a spunky, good-natured rescue service android and the pilot of Grit, a sentient bipedal power armor mecha known as a Paladin. The pair work as operatives for Gauntlet, a peacekeeping organization dedicated to defending Earth from invaders, consisting of the group's unnamed but reputable Director, the scientist responsible for Paladin research and development Dr. Bloom and the group's timid and easily frightened technical support member Etch.

The group works together to fight against the dark prince Ravenous (a tall bird-like creature closely resembling a griffin) along with his army of demonic creatures led by the powerful Weapon Keepers, each of which bearing a strong resemblance to entities from human myth and folklore such as the Egyptian god Anubis, the Russian apparition Baba Yaga and the Greek monster Medusa.

A stoic and enigmatic centaur-like creature known as The Horseman also appears randomly throughout the game as a seemingly neutral party, frequently challenging Flame and Grit to fights. He provides assistance to the pair on numerous occasions, although his intentions and loyalties remain mostly unclear.

=== Plot ===
A large weapon-shaped meteor falls from space to Earth, landing near Gauntlet's HQ in Canada. Demonic invaders led by a Wendigo monster suddenly appear from within it and begin wreaking havoc. Flame and Grit arrive shortly after and chase the Wendigo deep into the complex, cornering it near their transport ship. Before the duo can engage the monster, it is swiftly killed by The Horseman who battles the two in its place. After a brief scuffle, The Horseman retreats and the pair leave the ruined facility in their transport ship, meeting up with the rest of Gauntlet soon after.

Dr. Bloom explains to the group that weapon-shaped meteorites landed in ten countries across the planet, each one acting as a transfer gateway to allow for demonic entities to invade cities across the globe. She explains briefly how a secret religious parchment foretold that spirit weapons would be crafted at a place known as the Forge and would be used to take over the planet, inciting a cosmic war. The group then receives a message from the dark prince Ravenous, ordering the planet to surrender or face destruction. Adamant in fulfilling her role as a rescue android, Flame offers to engage Ravenous' Weapon Keepers as a Squire pilot with Grit. Despite his reservations about Flame's abilities, the Director allows Flame to travel across the globe and fight against Ravenous' monsters as a Squire pilot operative for Gauntlet.

Once Ravenous' final Weapon Keeper is defeated, the skies around Earth begin to darken as the planet is thrust into a perpetual state of twilight. Dr. Bloom and Grit suddenly detect a massive energy spike as The Horseman appears, opening a conduit to an Inverted Tower now orbiting the planet and the cause of the phenomenon. He asks Flame and Grit to go to the Spirit Forge within the tower and stop Ravenous, giving a cryptic warning to the pair not to follow in the footsteps of their predecessor. Initially confused, Flame dismisses The Horseman's warning and proceeds to the Inverted Tower.

Once they arrive, the pair encounter a heavily decayed and hostile Paladin mecha. After a fierce battle, Flame and Grit manage to defeat the Paladin who then forcibly ejects its lifeless operator, a woman bearing a striking resemblance to Flame. The duo contacts the Director, who explains that the woman controlling the Paladin was the first Squire pilot Blaze who Gauntlet had lost contact with following a sabotage mission against Ravenous' forces. He reveals that Flame was built in her image and was allowed to become a Squire pilot partially in the hopes that Blaze could eventually be rescued by her. Ravenous then contacts Flame, telling her that Blaze became corrupted trying to wield his demonic weapons, a fate that all who try to ultimately share. Undeterred, Flame and Grit continue on to the Spirit Forge to confront Ravenous.

The duo makes their way through the Inverted Tower, eventually reaching Ravenous' lair within the Spirit Forge. He appears and commends Flame's belligerence, offering the duo a place at his side as an ally. After refusing his offer, Flame and Grit engage Ravenous in a final battle to decide the fate of Earth. The duo eventually manages to defeat Ravenous and emerge victorious, with his demonic lance being all that remains of him following the battle. The Horseman then appears, telling the pair to think very carefully about what they do with Ravenous' weapon. How the player interacts with the weapon determines the game's ending.

If the player picks up the weapon and leaves the area with it, the bad ending plays out in which The Horseman confronts Flame, claiming that she is disrupting the spirit balance by choosing to take the weapon and is destined to be consumed by it just as Blaze was. An already possessed Flame denies this, claiming that it was Blaze's fault for being a weak human unable to control the weapon's power. The Horseman and Flame battle, although the outcome of the battle is unknown. A final scene depicts Flame and Grit standing atop Gauntlet's now destroyed transport ship before a massive army of monsters, raising up Ravenous' lance triumphantly as their new leader.

If the player refuses to pick up the weapon and leaves the area or picks it up and deliberately breaks it, the good ending plays out. With the demonic weapons destroyed and good prevailing, The Horseman appears before Flame and Grit one final time, giving another cryptic warning against humans creating any further weapons lest he return as an enemy against them. Flame retorts, saying humans are good people and don't inherently want to create weapons. The Spirit Forge then begins to crumble as the three make their escape.

Flame and Grit return safely to Earth while The Horseman uses his spirit energy to tow the Inverted Tower back to deep space. The duo is then contacted by the Director, congratulating Flame for her hard work. Just before he gives the two their next assignment, Flame refuses to join up with Gauntlet as a Squire pilot operative for the time being, desiring to do something better with herself. Returning to civilian life, Flame and Grit join a construction team and happily assist them with repairs on the cities destroyed during the invasion.

== Development ==
Tribute Games announced the game's title with promotional art and early screenshots on March 13, 2019. Concerning early development, game designer and art director Jonathan Lavigne stated in a press release: "For a long time I wanted to make a NES-style game with swordplay mechanics like the ones from Zelda II on NES. Panzer Paladin is the culmination of two subjects I wanted to address in a traditional platformer: swordplay and mechas. A strong aspect I also wanted to include in this project is the various usage of an array of weapons. A little bit like in our previous title Mercenary Kings". The developers also mentioned that they would be including over 100 unique kinds of weapons in the final game.

The prototype demo of Panzer Paladin was showcased for the first time at PAX East in 2019. The game was slated for release in Spring 2020, but was later pushed back to a Summer 2020 release date. On February 25, 2020, the studio announced that Panzer Paladin will be made available on both Steam (for Microsoft Windows) and Nintendo Switch. They later announced the game's slated release date of July 21, 2020 via social media on July 8 of the same year.

A major content update entitled Challenge Core was released for both Switch and Steam users on November 23, 2020. This free-to-download update added new challenge levels with leaderboard integration along with new 8-bit renditions of the game's soundtrack and expanded weapon storage space for the Blacksmith, the game's weapon creation tool.

A port of Panzer Paladin for Xbox and PlayStation consoles was released on June 13, 2024, and announced by Tribute Games via social media the same day.

== Reception ==
Reception

Aggregate scores
Aggregator	Score
Metacritic	NS: 77/100; PC: 76/100
OpenCritic	79% recommend

Review scores
Publication	Score
Destructoid	8/10
Hardcore Gamer	3.5/5
IGN	8/10
Nintendo Life	8/10
Nintendo World Report	8/10
USgamer	4/5

The game received "generally favorable" reviews, according to the review aggregator Metacritic. Fellow review aggregator OpenCritic assessed that the game received strong approval, being recommended by 79% of critics.

The visual design and presentation of Panzer Paladin received significant praise. Stuart Gipp from Nintendo Life was impressed by the game's visuals, stating "Panzer Paladin's vivid, beautifully-drawn graphics are somewhere between the familiar 8-bit aesthetic and the smooth fidelity of contemporary coin-ops ... From the backgrounds to the enemy sprites to the perfectly-done animation, the game's look flawlessly complements its feel." IGN's Seth Macy agreed, noting "[The game's plot] sets the perfect tone for the gameplay, and the story plays out in animated cutscenes that would be right at home in any legendary anime of the series, such as Bubblegum Crisis or one of the dozen or so Gundam series over the years."

Some reviewers weren't as positive, with most of the criticism directed at the game's high difficulty. Screen Rant's Alex Santa Maria was particularly critical, writing "Outside of those who've mastered every masochistic NES classic, it's just not clear who Panzer Paladin is going to appeal to - and as a result, only hardcore fans of the genre should even attempt to give this one a spin." He also criticized the gameplay, feeling that "even when in the mech, slow movement and basic swordplay turns any backtracking into a torturous undertaking." Reviewing the PC version, James Cunningham from Hardcore Gamer was more lenient with the game, conceding that "There's a lot to love here, including harder remixed versions of the levels and a speed-run mode, but its mean-spirited death penalties mean you have to work for it."

Nadia Oxford from USgamer gave a more positive review, stating that the game "adopts a bit of every NES platformer you played as a kid, and the result is a little chaotic, but a lot of fun ... there are times when the instructions are vague and the lives system doesn't need to exist in this day and age, but it's hard to stay mad when you're surrounded by this much 8-bit beauty."
