= Flinthook =

2017 video game

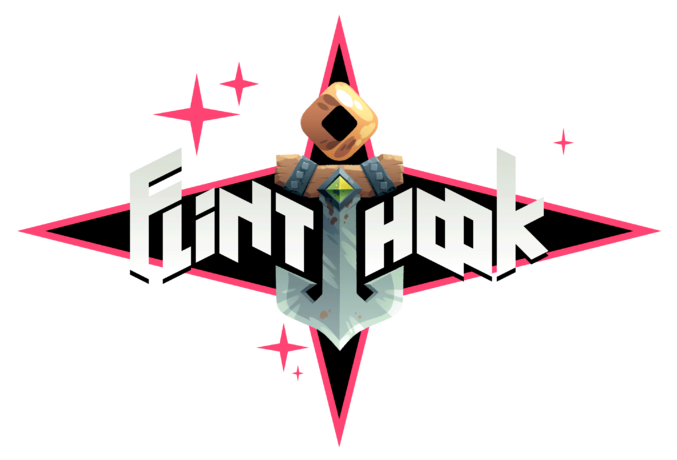
- Developer: Tribute Games
- Publisher: Tribute Games (Note: Physical version for PlayStation 4 distributed by Limited Run Games.)
- Designers: Dominique Ferland; Marion Esquian
- Programmers: Andrew G. Crowell; Michael Larouche; Jean‑François Major; François Masse
- Artists: Stéphane Boutin; Johan Vinet
- Writer: Yannick Belzil
- Composer: Patrice Bourgeault
- Platforms: PlayStation 4; Linux; macOS; Windows; Xbox One; Nintendo Switch
- Release: PlayStation 4; April 14, 2017; Linux, macOS, Windows, Xbox One; April 18, 2017; Nintendo Switch March 9, 2018
- Genres: Platformer, Roguelike
- Mode: Single-player

Flinthook is a roguelike platformer by Tribute Games in which the player's character uses a grappling hook to traverse procedurally generated spaceships for treasure. The developers were inspired by "rogue-lites" including Spelunky and Rogue Legacy. They said that the grappling hook game mechanic was their hardest design challenge. The game was released in April 2017 for Windows, macOS, Linux, PlayStation 4, and Xbox One, followed by a release for Nintendo Switch in March 2018. Early previews of Flinthook noted the accessibility and tightness of the controls. Digital Trends and Kotaku listed the game among the best in show at the June 2016 Electronic Entertainment Expo.

== Gameplay ==
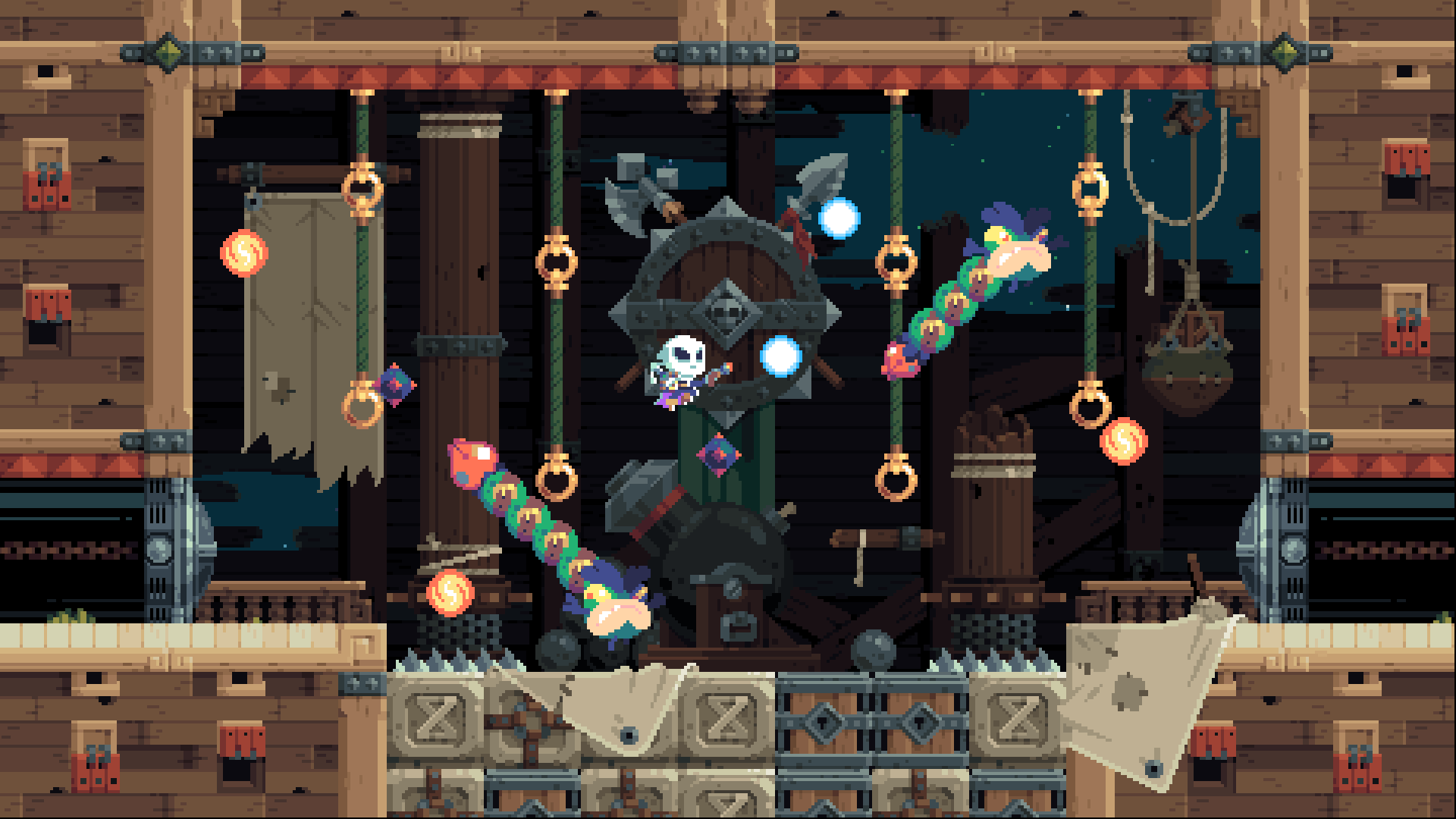
Video and screenshot of gameplay

Flinthook is a roguelike platformer in which the player controls a masked space pirate who explores procedurally generated ships for treasure with a grappling chain hook. Captain Flinthook, the player-character, also has a plasma gun and the ability to slow time. The hook is used on environmental elements as well as enemies. For example, some enemies are invulnerable until the player removes their armor via the hook. The player uses the left analog stick to both control the player and aim the hook. The hook is activated via the controller's trigger, and face buttons make the character jump, shoot, throw bombs and interact with nearby objects. The game's level design and room contents are randomly generated, such that a room might look familiar but contain different enemies. The player unlocks different bounties to hunt down, and must start a chapter over from the beginning upon their character's death. The game is depicted in pixel art.

== Development ==
Tribute Games is an indie development studio based in Montreal that previously worked on Mercenary Kings. In November 2015, the game's designer, Dominique Ferland, polled his contacts on Twitter about their interest in "Spiderman with a gun" as a game concept. Tribute Games co-founder Jean-François Major said that perfecting the feel of the grappling hook was the team's hardest challenge. The game was inspired by other "rogue-lite" games, such as Spelunky and Rogue Legacy, though the team did not design their game to be exceptionally difficult for all players. Less than a month after the release of Ninja Senki DX, Tribute announced Flinthook in March 2016 with a mosaic teaser on Twitch. The game's procedural generation was working in the office Windows version of the game at the time of announcement, though their demo used a predetermined level. Limited Run Games released a physical edition of the game for PlayStation 4 on April 14, 2017, with a production run of 4,500 copies. A digital version published by Tribute Games released for Windows, macOS, Linux, PlayStation 4, and Xbox One on April 18, 2017. A digital version for Nintendo Switch was released on March 9, 2018.

== Reception ==
Reception

Aggregate score
| Aggregator | Score |
|---|---|
| Metacritic | PS4: 76/100 |

Review scores
| Publication | Score |
|---|---|
| Destructoid | 8.5/10 |
| Digital Trends | 3.5/5 |
| Game Informer | 7.5/10 |
| Nintendo World Report | 8/10 |
| PC Gamer (US) | 79% |

Digital Trends listed the game among the best in show at the June 2016 Electronic Entertainment Expo and added that though many major games were adding grappling hook features, Flinthook was the only one to support a whole game based on the concept. The website praised the game's "imaginative artwork and refined, fun gameplay". Nick Robinson (Polygon) wrote that the game's controls were "enormously intuitive", easily accessible, and comfortable.

The game received "generally favorable" reviews, according to video game review aggregator Metacritic. Rock, Paper, Shotgun included it among the year's best action games.
