= Ninja Senki =

Indie video game

- Developers: Ninja Senki; Jonathan Lavigne; Ninja Senki DX; Tribute Games
- Publishers: Ninja Senki; Jonathan Lavigne; Ninja Senki DX; Tribute Games
- Composers: Ninja Senki; Patrice Bourgeault
- Platforms: PlayStation 4, PlayStation Vita, Windows, Mac OS
- Release: Ninja Senki December 20, 2010; Ninja Senki DX February 23, 2016
- Genres: Action platformer, side-scroller
- Mode: Single-player

Ninja Senki is a 2D action platform video game created by Canadian indie developer Jonathan Lavigne. It was inspired by classic NES games such as Ninja JaJaMaru-kun and Mega Man. The 8-bit style game has the same resolution as Game Boy console games (160 x 144 pixels).

The game was originally released on December 20, 2010, and was available as a freeware on Windows. The deluxe version was later released on February 23, 2016, under the name of Ninja Senki DX by the independent developer Tribute Games. It is available on Windows, Mac OS, PlayStation 4, and PlayStation Vita.

== Gameplay ==
You play the game as Hayate, the shurikenjutsu master. When Princess Kinuhime is slain by a demon, Hayate becomes obsessed with revenge. Casting aside the art of invisibility, the blue ninja fights against mythological creatures, demons and other adversaries in his quest for vengeance!

The game is single-player based. It is divided in 16 levels and has multiple endings. The Ninja Senki DX edition includes 3 new gameplay modes to permit you to test your abilities: Hardcore Mode (no saving), Boss Rush Mode, and Challenge Mode. The challenges involve completing each of the 16 levels under certain conditions such as killing every enemy, collecting all kobans (coins), and finishing the level within a certain time limit.

== Development ==
The game was created by Jonathan Lavigne. The original soundtrack of Ninja Senki was composed by Patrice Bourgeault and the sound effects where created by Jean Chan.

In 2016, Ninja Senki DX was released as an official production from Tribute Games. It features new enemy designs. Any foe that used similar sprites but a different color palette were completely redesigned as new enemies. The effect upon killing enemies was also changed. While the enemies in the original release died in a rain of blood red spheres, they now disappear in a small firework explosion.

The soundtrack has been remixed by Patrice Bourgeault again. In Ninja Senki DX, it is possible to play either with the original soundtrack or the remixed version.
