= Wizorb =

2011 video game

- Developer: Tribute Games
- Publisher: Tribute Games
- Designer: Jonathan Lavigne
- Programmer: Jean‑François Major
- Artists: Jonathan Lavigne; Paul Robertson; Justin Cyr
- Composer: Jean Chan
- Engine: XNA
- Platforms: Windows, Xbox 360, PlayStation Portable, PlayStation Vita, Linux, Mac OS X, iOS, Ouya, Nintendo Switch
- Release: XBLIG; September 29, 2011; Windows; November 7, 2011; Linux, Mac OS X December 19, 2011; PS Minis; July 25, 2012 iOS; August 3, 2012; OUYA; March 28, 2013; Nintendo Switch; October 6, 2022
- Genre: Breakout clone
- Mode: Single-player

Wizorb is a video game created and published by Tribute Games. It was released on the Xbox 360 Xbox Live Marketplace on September 29, 2011. The gameplay is a cross between a Breakout clone and a role-playing video game. Wizorb was ported to Microsoft Windows, Mac OS X, and Linux. It was released for Windows through Steam on March 14, 2012, with support for Steam Achievements and Steam Cloud. Upon release, Wizorb saw favorable reviews from critics, with VentureBeat's Jacob Siegal listing it as one of the top 10 independent video games of 2011.

== Gameplay ==
Wizorb is a cross between Breakout and a role-playing game. The core of the game takes place in a Breakout clone where the player can use magic to control the ball and help destroy the bricks and enemies. The RPG elements concern rebuilding a town, restoring its citizens and leadership, while the primary block-breaking gameplay concerns fighting mini-bosses and bosses.

== Development ==
Wizorb was developed by Tribute Games and first released for the Xbox 360 through the Xbox Live Marketplace's Xbox Live Indie Games section on September 29, 2011. The game is the first title by the independent developer Tribute Games. Destructoid's Jordan Devore noted that high quality Xbox 360 indie games are often ported to the PC, saying that "Wizorb is one such game". A port for Microsoft Windows was released on November 7 of the same year, through the digital distribution website GamersGate. The computer version can be controlled by a gamepad, keyboard, or mouse. The entire game can be played using only a mouse, and the developer recommends this method as it "makes Wizorb rely even more on reflexes which feels great and makes the game a tad easier".

Even before the Windows release, the developers were working on porting the game to Mac OS X and Linux. The developers considered porting the game to a smartphone platform. Using the MonoGame programming library, ports were released for OS X and Linux. The Windows version was made available through the Steam digital distribution platform on March 14, 2012. The game was released for the Nintendo Switch on October 6, 2022.

== Reception ==
Reception

Aggregate scores
Aggregator	Score
GameRankings	(X360) 93% (PC) 83% (PSP) 81% (iOS) 80%
Metacritic	(PC) 81/100 (iOS) 80/100 (PSP) 79/100 (NS) 76/100

Review scores
Publication	Score
Destructoid	(X360) 8.5/10
GamesMaster	(PSP) 80%
Gamezebo	(PC) 4/5
Jeuxvideo.com	(PC) 12/20
PlayStation Official Magazine – UK	(PSP) 8/10
PC Gamer (UK)	(PC) 88%
PC PowerPlay	(PC) 8/10
Pocket Gamer	4/5
Push Square	(PSP) 8/10
TouchArcade	(iOS) 4/5
Digital Spy	(iOS) 4/5

The game received "favorable" reviews on all platforms according to the review aggregation website Metacritic.

The Xbox 360 and PC versions were rated as one of the top 10 independent video games of 2011 by VentureBeat's Jacob Siegal.

== Legacy ==
Cyrus was supposed to appear as a playable cameo character in the then-upcoming Wii U and PC game Hex Heroes, before the Wii U version was canceled, and there is no indication that the game will ever be completed.
