= Tribute Games =

Canadian video game development studio

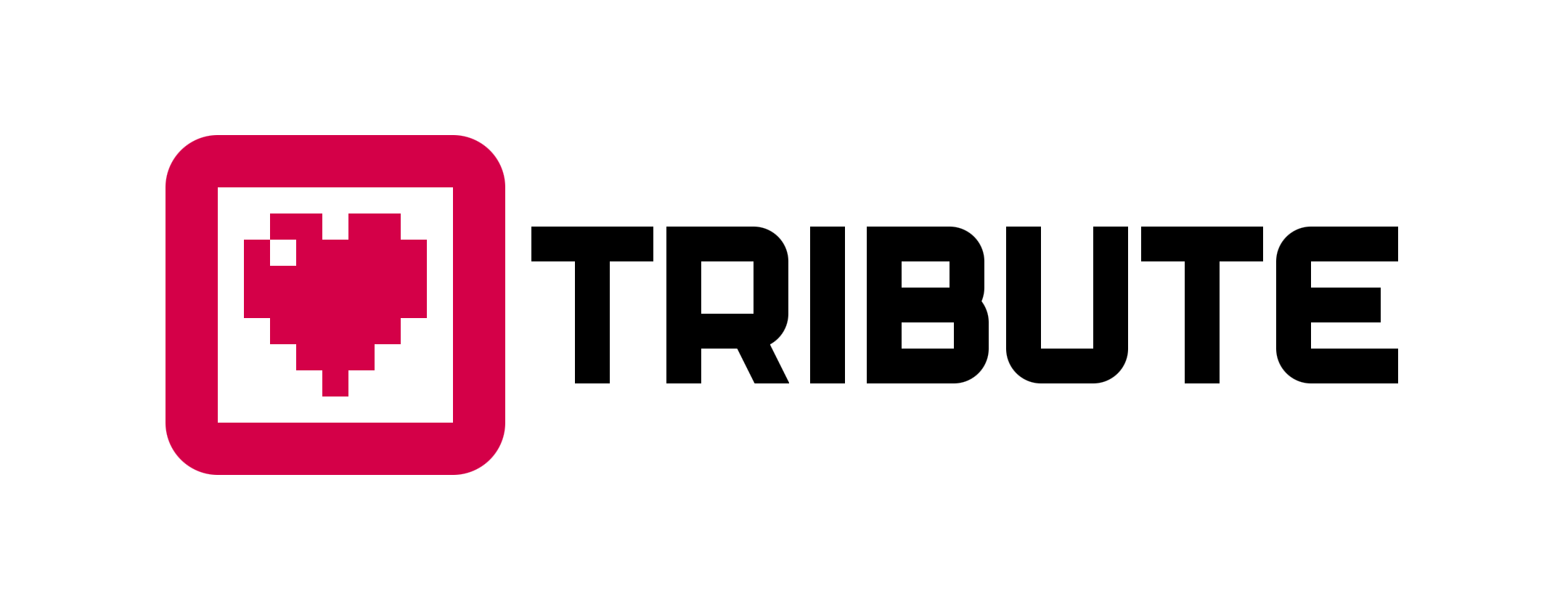
- Type: Private
- Industry: Video games
- Founded: 9 May 2011
- Founder: Jonathan Lavigne, Jean-Francois Major, Justin Cyr
- Headquarters: Montreal, Quebec, Canada
- Products: Wizorb, Mercenary Kings, Ninja Senki, Curses 'N Chaos, Flinthook, Panzer Paladin
- Website: www.tributegames.com/

Tribute Games is a Canadian independent video game development studio located in Montreal, Quebec. It was founded on 9 May 2011 by former Ubisoft employees Jonathan Lavigne, Jean-Francois Major and Justin Cyr who, amongst other games, have worked on Scott Pilgrim vs. the World: The Game and TMNT.

== Games ==
=== Games developed and published ===
Title	Release year	Platform(s)
Ninja Senki	2010	Microsoft Windows, PlayStation Vita
Wizorb	2011	Microsoft Windows, Linux, Mac OS X, PS Minis, XBLIG, Ouya, iOS
Friends 'Til The End	2012	Microsoft Windows (freeware as part of MolyJam 2012)
Mercenary Kings	2014	Microsoft Windows, Linux, Mac OS X, PlayStation 4
Curses 'N Chaos	2015	Microsoft Windows, Mac OS X, PlayStation 4, PlayStation Vita
Ninja Senki DX	2016	Microsoft Windows, Mac OS X, PlayStation 4, PlayStation Vita
Flinthook	2017	Microsoft Windows, PlayStation 4, Xbox One, Nintendo Switch
Mercenary Kings: Reloaded Edition	2018	Microsoft Windows, Mac OS X, PlayStation 4, PlayStation Vita, Xbox One, Nintendo Switch
Panzer Paladin	2020	Microsoft Windows, Nintendo Switch, PlayStation 4, Xbox One
Scott Pilgrim EX	2026	Linux, Microsoft Windows, PlayStation 4, PlayStation 5, Xbox One, Xbox Series X/S, Nintendo Switch, Nintendo Switch 2

=== Games developed ===
Title	Release year	Publisher	Platform(s)
Teenage Mutant Ninja Turtles: Shredder's Revenge	2022	Dotemu	Microsoft Windows, Linux, PlayStation 4, PlayStation 5, Xbox One, Xbox Series X/S, Nintendo Switch, Android, iOS
Marvel Cosmic Invasion	2025	Dotemu	Microsoft Windows, Linux, PlayStation 4, PlayStation 5, Xbox Series X/S, Nintendo Switch, Nintendo Switch 2

=== Games published ===
Title	Release year	Developer(s)	Platform(s)
Steel Assault	2021	Zenovia Interactive	Microsoft Windows, Nintendo Switch
