= Futuridium EP Deluxe =

2014 video game

- Developer: MixedBag
- Publishers: MixedBag; Playism
- Composers: Omar Ferrero; Luca Gasperoni
- Engine: Unity
- Platforms: PlayStation 4 PlayStation Vita; Wii U New Nintendo 3DS iOS; Microsoft Windows; Mac OS X Linux
- Release: PlayStation 4, PlayStation Vita: NA: September 30, 2014; EU: October 1, 2014; AU: October 1, 2014; iOS: NA: July 18, 2016; Microsoft Windows: NA: July 15, 2016; Wii U: NA: May 26, 2016; EU: May 26, 2016; New Nintendo 3DS: NA: September 8, 2016; EU: September 15, 2016
- Genre: Shoot'em up
- Mode: Single-player

Futuridium EP Deluxe is an indie shoot'em up video game developed by Italian developer MixedBag (now Memorable Games) for the PlayStation 4, PlayStation Vita, Microsoft Windows, OS X and Linux. It was released in North America on September 30, 2014 and on October 1, 2014, in Europe.

The design of the game was influenced by the Commodore 64 title Uridium and the Star Fox series.

== Reception ==
Reception

Aggregate scores
Aggregator	Score
GameRankings	73% (PSVITA); 70% (PS4); 66% (iOS)
Metacritic	73/100 (PS4); 70/100 (iOS); 65/100 (PSVITA)

Review scores
Publication	Score
IGN	8/10
Nintendo Life	7/10

Futuridium EP Deluxe was received mixed to positive reviews upon release. The PlayStation Vita version holds a 75% rating on review aggregator GameRankings, while the PlayStation 4 version has a 70% rating. On Metacritic, the PlayStation 4 and Vita versions hold scores of 74/100 and 65/100 respectively. IGN gave both versions an 8/10.

== Release ==
On March 3, 2016, it was announced that Futuridium EP Deluxe would be releasing on both the New Nintendo 3DS and Wii U platforms within the year. On March 4, 2016, developer MixedBag revealed that Futuridium EP Deluxe would receive a limited physical release of just 4,000 copies through Limited Run Games between both the PlayStation 4 and PlayStation Vita.
