= Teenage Mutant Ninja Turtles: Shredder's Revenge =

- Developer: Tribute Games
- Publisher: Dotemu (Note: iOS and Android ports published by Netflix, later by Playdigious in April 15, 2025)
- Director: Jonathan Lavigne
- Producers: Christian Cortez; Alban Ligouzat
- Designers: Frédéric Gémus; Simon Graveline
- Programmers: Jean-François Major; Andrew G. Crowell; François Masse; Maxime Schambourg
- Artists: Julian Adam Marin; Stéphane Boutin; Paul Robertson
- Writer: Yannick Belzil
- Composer: Tee Lopes
- Series: Teenage Mutant Ninja Turtles
- Platforms: Linux; Nintendo Switch; PlayStation 4; Windows; Xbox One; Xbox Series X/S; PlayStation 5; Android; iOS
- Release: Linux, Nintendo Switch, PlayStation 4, Windows, Xbox One: WW: June 16, 2022; PlayStation 5: WW: November 15, 2022; Android, iOS: WW: January 10, 2023
- Genre: Beat 'em up
- Modes: Single-player, multiplayer

Teenage Mutant Ninja Turtles: Shredder's Revenge is a 2022 beat 'em up game developed by Tribute Games and published by Dotemu. It is inspired by and based on the 1987 Teenage Mutant Ninja Turtles animated series and borrows stylistically from the arcade and home console Turtles games developed by Konami during the 1980s and 1990s. The player assumes control of one of the Turtles or their allies as they set out to stop Shredder and Krang from taking over New York City, while facing foes that stand in their way.

Nickelodeon approached Dotemu following the release of Wonder Boy: The Dragon's Trap (2017) about the possibility of developing a video game adaptation of one of its franchises. Knowing that Tribute Games had been pitching a Turtles game to Nickelodeon since 2010, the two companies decided to work together. The Turtles voice actors from the 1987 series reprise their roles. The music was composed by Tee Lopes, with contributions from guitarist Jonny Atma, rappers Mega Ran, Ghostface Killah, and Raekwon, and singer Mike Patton.

Shredder's Revenge was released for Windows, Linux, Nintendo Switch, PlayStation 4, and Xbox One on June 16, 2022, and for PlayStation 5 on November 15, 2022. The game received critical acclaim, with reviewers praising the pixel-based visual style, playable character roster and combat mechanics, while criticism was directed at audio quality issues and the short length of the story mode. The game was also a commercial success, selling one million copies within a week of release. New playable characters and modes have been added to the game via downloadable content.

== Gameplay ==
Teenage Mutant Ninja Turtles: Shredder's Revenge is a beat 'em up game featuring the four titular turtles and additional playable allies, such as April O'Neil.

Shredder's Revenge is a side-scrolling action brawler with a pixelated artstyle and elements from Battletoads. The player assumes control of Leonardo, Donatello, Raphael, Michelangelo, April O'Neil, Master Splinter, and unlockable character Casey Jones as they combat opponents including the Foot Clan, Bebop and Rocksteady, Krang, and Shredder in locations ranging from New York City sewers to Dimension X. Each character has their own attributes (range, speed, and power) and plays differently. They have unique super moves and taunts. Throughout each stage, players can find pizza boxes, which can be used to heal them, and other pies that grant players extra strength and infinite supers for a brief period of time.

The game features two different modes: Arcade Mode and Story Mode. In arcade mode, players have a limited amount of lives, and the game must be completed in one sitting. Story mode allows players to exchange accumulated points for health, extra lives, additional combat moves, and a special ability known as Radical Mode which temporarily enhances the player character's combat abilities. In story mode, each stage has optional side-content, challenges, and collectibles. In addition to the single-player mode, the game supports cooperative multiplayer for up to six players, both online and locally. (Note: Due to hardware limitations, the PlayStation 4 and 5 versions only support up to four players during local play.) Players can high-five to share health, or work together to perform certain moves.

A downloadable expansion, Dimension Shellshock, adds a new Survival gameplay mode, in which the Turtles and their allies must travel to other dimensions to stop Shredder from conquering the multiverse. The expansion also adds two new playable characters, Miyamoto Usagi and Karai, and unlockable character costumes. Two more playable characters, Mona Lisa and Mondo Gecko, are available via the Radical Reptiles DLC.

== Plot ==
Leonardo, Donatello, Raphael and Michelangelo along with April O'Neil and Master Splinter are watching the news on TV when it is interrupted by Bebop, who announces the Foot has returned and is taking over the Statue of Liberty. The Turtles go to the Channel 6 building and find Bebop with the head of Krang's android body, but Rocksteady takes it away while they are fighting Bebop. The team fight Foot operatives and other adversaries while pursuing Krang, finding other parts of his body being reconstructed. Their chase leads them to Dimension X, where they fight their way through the destroyed Technodrome, until they eventually reach their enemy's lair in Dimension X and face Shredder and Krang in his new body. This was actually a diversion to get the Turtles away from New York while they are turning the Statue of Liberty into the Statue of Tyranny, a robot controlled by Krang. The Turtles return to New York and defeat Krang and the mutated Super Shredder.

After the battle, the heroes return to their lair and watch the news as the city is being restored, but are disappointed to see that the credit goes to the Punk Frogs. That night the Turtles, along with April, Splinter and Casey Jones celebrate their victory with pizza; another ending is unlocked when finding all the cameos (Irma Langenstein, Vernon Fenwick, Burne Thompson, the Punk Frogs and Neutrinos), in which they are posing at the restored Statue of Liberty, which now sports a red ninja bandana.

=== Dimension Shellshock ===
The ninja team celebrate another pizza party (now joined by samurai rabbit Miyamoto Usagi and surviving Foot Clan member Karai), however it gets interrupted by the Neutrinos, who informs the turtles that Shredder is planning to conquer the multiverse. In order to stop him they must collect 6 crystals from different dimensions to reach Shredder's lair. After they have defeated Shredder, the Neutrinos award the heroes 10 new brands of pizza from other dimensions, however they find them difficult to be eaten.

== Development ==
Shredder's Revenge was developed by Montreal-based Tribute Games. The team had experiences working on brawler games at Ubisoft on Scott Pilgrim vs. the World: The Game and TMNT. Nickelodeon approached Dotemu following the release of Wonder Boy: The Dragon's Trap (2017) on the possibility of developing an adaptation of one of its franchises. After finding out that Tribute Games had been pitching a Teenage Mutant Ninja Turtles game to Nickelodeon since 2010, the two companies decided to work together after meeting each other at Game Developers Conference. The game was inspired by the animated series that debuted in 1987 and the arcade games in the 1990s such as Turtles in Time (1991). While the game paid homage to older Turtles games, the team wanted to modernize the series by introducing various quality-of-life enhancements, online multiplayer, and locations that have not been seen in a 2D Turtles game.

The game features voice acting, with the original cast of the 1987 television series, Cam Clarke, Barry Gordon, Rob Paulsen, and Townsend Coleman reprising their roles. The soundtrack was composed by Tee Lopes, who is known for his work on other retro-style games such as Sonic Mania and Streets of Rage 4. Guitarist Jonny Atma provided the guitar recordings for most of the soundtrack, and vocals for the song "Panic in the Sky!". Singer Mike Patton was invited to perform the theme song for the game. American rapper Mega Ran contributed vocals to the credits theme, "It's a Pizza Party!", while Ghostface Killah and Raekwon of the Wu-Tang Clan were featured in Shredder's boss theme, "We Ain't Came to Lose".

== Release ==
Dotemu announced Shredder's Revenge on March 10, 2021. On August 25, 2021, a trailer was revealed during Gamescom showcasing April O'Neil as a playable character. On February 10, 2022, another trailer was released revealing Master Splinter as a playable character. The release date trailer was revealed at Summer Game Fest on June 9, 2022, which showcased Casey Jones as a playable character. The game was released digitally for Windows, Linux, Nintendo Switch, PlayStation 4, and Xbox One on June 16, 2022, and on the PlayStation 5 on November 15, 2022. A version for iOS and Android mobile devices was published by Netflix on January 10, 2023., and without subscription game release on April 15, 2025.

Four limited editions of the game were made available by Limited Run Games: The Standard Edition, which includes a physical copy of the game, a reversible cover, an art booklet, a sprite sticker sheet, and a redeemable Pizza Hut coupon. A PC-exclusive edition, that includes everything in The Standard Edition plus retro big box PC packaging, a USB stick with the game, a steel book case, and a mouse pad. The Classic Edition includes everything in The Standard Edition plus a retro VHS sleeve with a tape box to store the game and a steel book case. The Radical Edition includes everything in The Classic Edition, plus a strategy guide, a poster, a Shredder action figure, a shadow box, a mini arcade cabinet replica, a CD soundtrack, and blister box packaging. Merge Games and Signature Edition Games offered a special edition of the game, which included a physical copy of the game, a signed art card, a special edition outer sleeve, a pizza key ring and booklet inside the game case, a Shredder key ring, individual pins for all four Turtles, a CD soundtrack, a metal coaster, and one randomly selected Turtle mask.

The soundtrack was released on digital platforms on the same day as the game's release. It was further released on CD and vinyl later that year by Kid Katana Records. To promote it, a single version of "We Ain't Come to Lose" was released on June 13, 2022.

At release, there were no plans for post-launch downloadable content (DLC) for the game. Dotemu's CEO, Cyrille Imbert, suggested that DLC could happen depending on critical reception and player feedback. Tribute Games' Yannick Belzil clarified that if DLC were to happen, they would like to bring in characters from other continuities and reinterpret them in the 1987 style, naming Jennika and Venus de Milo as examples. One year after its original launch, a DLC expansion was announced in June 2023, subtitled Dimension Shellshock, which adds a new survival game mode, palette swaps for each of the characters, and two playable characters, Miyamoto Usagi from Usagi Yojimbo and Karai. The expansion was released on August 31, 2023. A second DLC pack, Radical Reptiles, was released on September 24, 2024; the DLC adds Mona Lisa and Mondo Gecko as playable characters. A free update released alongside the DLC adds chiptune remixes of every music track; the remixes were primarily arranged by guest composer Sean Bialo, with some tracks contributed by Anamanaguchi, Jake Kaufman, Keiji Yamagishi, Tomoya Tomita, and Button Masher.

== Reception ==
Reception

Aggregate scores
| Aggregator | Score |
|---|---|
| Metacritic | (NS) 87/100 (PC) 84/100 (PS4) 85/100 (XONE) 87/100 |
| OpenCritic | 86/100; 97% Critics Recommend |

Review scores
| Publication | Score |
|---|---|
| Destructoid | 7.5/10 |
| Electronic Gaming Monthly | 4/5 |
| Game Informer | 8.75/10 |
| GameSpot | 8/10 |
| Hardcore Gamer | 4.5/5 |
| HobbyConsolas | 88/100 |
| IGN | 8/10 |
| Jeuxvideo.com | 16/20 |
| Nintendo Life | 9/10 |
| Nintendo World Report | 9/10 |
| PC Gamer (US) | 79/100 |
| Push Square | 8/10 |
| Shacknews | 9/10 |
| TouchArcade | 5/5 |
| Pure Xbox | 9/10 |

Teenage Mutant Ninja Turtles: Shredder's Revenge received "generally favorable" reviews, according to review aggregator website Metacritic; it is the highest-rated Teenage Mutant Ninja Turtles game on the website. In July 2022, Tribute Games and Dotemu announced that the game had sold over one million copies in its first week. The Nintendo Switch version was the seventeenth best-selling retail game during its first week of release in Japan, with 4,365 physical copies being sold in the country.

Critics generally lauded the game's appealing personality, animations, music, distinct playstyles, combat, and multiplayer. Chris Moyse of Destructoid found the game's attention to detail to be charismatic, writing, "Where Shredder’s Revenge shines brightest, however, is in its personality, utilizing... Individual run cycles, taunts, and celebrations; goofy background characters; and nods to previous TMNT games, shows, and movies." Mollie L. Patterson of EGM thought that the game surpassed the quality of the titles it drew inspiration from and called its visuals "by far the game's best feature", while further praising the stage variety, accessible depth, distinct character-based playstyles, and enemy roster. Marcus Stewart of Game Informer praised the use of level-specific objectives meant to encourage player exploration and the game's chaotic brand of local multiplayer entertainment, stating, "Sure, losing track of yourself in the sea of digital humanity happens often and can be mildly frustrating, but the joy of laughing and cheering alongside so many buddies dulls that irritation." Mitchell Saltzman of IGN said that Shredder's Revenge had "one of the best soundtracks of the year", and commended the inclusion of additional character mobility options and a meter which incentivized skilled playstyles.

Tom Massey of Nintendo Life was impressed by the game's visuals and wrote, "Familiar locations are rendered with fresh, loving attention to detail, gorgeous colour, and an authentic cartoon flavour, all strung together with great visual storytelling", while also lauding the variety of stages and enemies, well-rounded character roster, and "sterling" soundtrack. PC Gamer's Dominic Tarason thought positively of the distinct stages and characters, saying, "The backdrops rarely repeat, which is impressive considering Shredder's Revenge is about four times the length of Turtles in Time and far more detailed... The character art is equally lush—despite all having the same body shape, there's few frames shared between the turtles. Their animations capture their personality..." Push Square praised the game's use of rollback netcode and the stability of the online co-op mode, noting that it was "as sturdy as local [co-op]." TJ Denzer of Shacknews said that Shredder's Revenge was one of the best beat-em-ups he had ever played, and wrote, "Each character is fun to explore, the music will stay in your head long after you stop playing, and even if the game feels a bit short, there are plenty of reasons to go back."

Though critics generally regarded the game positively, they took minor issue with a few of its elements. Destructoid felt that while the title was deeper than its predecessors, it broke little new ground in the genre, and deemed its combat mechanics less precise than the ones seen in Streets of Rage 4. EGM criticized the game's subpar audio quality, and wrote, "All of the audio in this game is disappointing... Some of the voice acting sounds really off. Attacks often lack that satisfying oomph when hitting an opponent. Explosions sound anemic. A few of the sound effects are just outright terrible." Game Informer and GameSpot expressed concern with the game's short length, repetitive side missions, and the lack of visual clarity during more populated multiplayer sessions. IGN and Nintendo Life noted that the lack of variety in the game's level design felt overly safe and made the game feel repetitive towards the end. PC Gamer expressed minor gripes with the hollow Story Mode, poorly scaled difficulty and leveling system, unremarkable side quests, and lack of longevity.

=== Accolades ===
Accolades for Teenage Mutant Ninja Turtles: Shredder's Revenge
| Year | Award | Category | Result | Ref. |
|---|---|---|---|---|
| 2022 | Golden Joystick Awards | Best Audio | Nominated | |
| 2022 | Golden Joystick Awards | Best Multiplayer Game | Nominated | |
| 2022 | The Game Awards 2022 | Best Action Game | Nominated | |
| 2022 | The Game Awards 2022 | Best Multiplayer Game | Nominated | |
| 2023 | New York Game Awards | Tin Pan Alley Award for Best Music in a Game | Nominated | |
| 2023 | 26th Annual D.I.C.E. Awards | Outstanding Achievement for an Independent Game | Nominated | |
| 2023 | British Academy Games Awards | Family | Nominated | |
| 2023 | British Academy Games Awards | Multiplayer | Nominated | |
