= Curses 'N Chaos =

2015 video game

- Developer: Tribute Games
- Publisher: Tribute Games
- Designer: Justin Cyr
- Programmers: Jonathan Lavigne; Jean‑François Major; Michael Larouche
- Artists: Stéphane Boutin; Paul Robertson; Justin Cyr
- Writer: Yannick Belzil
- Composer: Patrice Bourgeault
- Platforms: Windows, OS X, PlayStation 4, PlayStation Vita
- Release: August 18, 2015
- Genres: Arena brawler, Action
- Modes: Single-player, multiplayer

Curses 'N Chaos is a 2D, wave-based, arena-brawler video game with a focus on 2-player co-op by independent developer Tribute Games. The game was released on August 18, 2015 for Windows, OS X, PlayStation 4, and PlayStation Vita.

== Gameplay ==
The game is a single screen arena brawler where you fight waves of enemies. Players have the ability to craft new items and power ups, as well play alongside a friend, locally or online. The PlayStation platforms support cross-buy, cross-save and cross-play features. Players can choose between one of two heroes, Lea and Leo, to fight in melee combat against progressively more difficult waves of AI enemies.
