= Steel Assault =

2021 video game

- Developer(s): Zenovia Interactive
- Publisher(s): Tribute Games
- Designer(s): Sri Kankanahalli
- Composer(s): Joseph Bailey; Luca Della Regina
- Platform(s): Windows; Nintendo Switch; Amazon Luna; PlayStation 4; Xbox One
- Release: Windows, Switch; September 28, 2021; Amazon Luna; April 7, 2022; PS4, Xbox One; June 15, 2023
- Genre(s): Action-platform
- Mode(s): Single-player

Steel Assault is a 2021 side-scrolling action-platforming video game developed by Zenovia Interactive and published by Tribute Games. It was released for Windows and Nintendo Switch on September 28, 2021 and for Amazon Luna on April 7, 2022. In this 16-bit style game, the player controls the character Taro Takahashi, a resistance soldier on a revenge mission against the dictator who lords over the ashes. The game was first announced on Kickstarter in early 2015.

== Gameplay ==
Steel Assault is a fast-paced 2D action platformer. The game equips the player with an 8-way electric whip, along with a jump, double jump, and a short dodge slide. One other mechanic is a zip-line which allows the player to move vertically, horizontally and diagonally between elements or platforms. In addition, the game features a basic sub-weapon system. Taro mainly fights robotic enemies, and his electric whip destroys their energy cores, but he can also punch them up close to collect their cores and replenish his sub-weapon system's energy. The game has different difficulty modes, including an Arcade Mode in which there are no checkpoints and the player has only a single life.

== Story ==
The game takes place in an overgrown post-apocalyptic America, after all major American cities were abandoned due to mass radiation attacks in the late 2030s. Magnus Pierce, a famous inventor and roboticist turned army general, rose to rule over the ashes. His regime began a large-scale purge of all its real and suspected enemies, including protagonist Taro Takahashi's parents. Taro grew up to be a core member of the Daybreak Resistance, an insurgency led by Hans Albrecht and Sonia Singh. In early 2046, Magnus Pierce's soldiers started collecting and refurbishing old nuclear, military, and robotic tech, and they started restoring the power grids of various abandoned cities which they now occupied. Taro is sent to investigate.

== Development ==
The project was first announced on Kickstarter in early 2015. Originally, the project meant to follow a late 8-bit era aesthetic (late NES), but the game's artistic direction changed soon after the Kickstarter campaign due to the previous experience from the artists that joined the project. Many of these artists had worked on Game Boy Advance and Nintendo DS games,. The game was due to release in May 2016, but had been delayed due in part to the change in art style. In November 2020, Zenovia Interactive signed a publishing agreement with developer Tribute Games.

== Reception ==
Reception

Aggregate score
| Aggregator | Score |
|---|---|
| Metacritic | PC: 77/100; NS: 75/100 |

Review scores
| Publication | Score |
|---|---|
| Nintendo Life | 8/10 |
| Nintendo World Report | 7/10 |

Steel Assault has received "generally favorable reviews", according to Metacritic.
