= Mercenary Kings =

2014 video game

- Developer: Tribute Games
- Publisher: Tribute Games
- Artist: Paul Robertson
- Platforms: Windows, Mac OS X, PlayStation 4, Vita, Linux, Switch, Xbox One
- Release: Windows, Mac OS X March 25, 2014; PS4; April 1, 2014; Switch, Vita, Xbox One; February 6, 2018
- Genre: Run and gun
- Modes: Single-player, multiplayer

Mercenary Kings is a side-scrolling run and gun video game developed and published by Tribute Games. It was funded by Kickstarter and released for Microsoft Windows on March 25, 2014, and for PlayStation 4 on April 1, 2014. Alongside the Mercenary Kings: Reloaded update, versions for the Nintendo Switch, Xbox One, and PlayStation Vita were released on February 6, 2018. An early-access version of the game was released on Steam on July 23, 2013.

== Gameplay ==
Mercenary Kings is a side-scrolling run and gun video game similar to games like SNK's Metal Slug series. Players can jump, crouch, roll, shoot in four directions and use a short range frontal melee attack to make their way through 100+ missions with a variety of enemies, bosses, and locations. Mercenary Kings offers up to four player co-op with online or local split screen play.

Missions are structured akin to the Monster Hunter series with levels accessed one at a time from a central hub area. Players gain rank points upon completion which are used to rank up and unlock more difficult sets of missions. Objectives vary from one level to another and include boss battles, hostage rescues, item collection, and more.

Enemies drop certain kinds of loot depending on their type which can be used to craft weapon parts, knives, armor, or mods which give unique player abilities. Gun creation involves crafting multiple components which affect the weapon's stats such as firing rate, magazine size, and weight. Ammo types can also be switched out to add elemental damage or change bullet behavior, though not all ammo types are compatible with all guns.

== Development ==
Tribute Games, formed from the team who previously worked on Scott Pilgrim vs. the World: The Game, including animator Paul Robertson, launched a Kickstarter campaign to fund production of Mercenary Kings. Their initial target was $75,000 for a basic PC version, with additional milestones listed to add additional levels and modes, online support and a console version. The Kickstarter received a total of $116,064. At E3 2013, Sony announced at their press conference that the game would receive a console release on the PlayStation 4. On July 23, 2013, an early-access version of the game, containing 60 of the final game's 100 missions, was released on Steam. A PlayStation Vita version of the game includes cross-buy and other cross-features.

== Reception ==
Reception

Aggregate score
Aggregator	Score
Metacritic	PC: 76/100; PS4: 70/100; NS: 69/100; XONE: 75/100

Mercenary Kings received mixed reviews upon release, with score of 70 for PlayStation 4 and 76 for PC version respectively by the aggregation website Metacritic.
