= Scott Pilgrim vs. the World: The Game =

2010 video game

Scott Pilgrim vs. The World: The Game
- Cover art, featuring (counterclockwise from top) Stephen Stills, Kim Pine, Scott Pilgrim, and Ramona Flowers
- Developers: Ubisoft Montreal; Ubisoft Chengdu (Note: Wallace Wells and Online Multiplayer downloadable content developed by Ubisoft Pune. The Complete Edition was developed by Engine Software.)
- Publisher: Ubisoft
- Director: Lei Yu
- Producer: Caroline Martin
- Designers: Jonathan Lavigne; Zhu Bi Jia; Yan Kai; Jiang An Qi; Ou Yue Song
- Programmer: WeiKe Zeng
- Artists: Paul Robertson; Stéphane Boutin; Jonathan Lavigne; Justin Cyr; Jonathan Kim; Mariel Cartwright
- Composer: Anamanaguchi
- Platforms: PlayStation 3; Xbox 360; Nintendo Switch; PlayStation 4; Windows; Xbox One; Stadia
- Release: PlayStation 3: NA: August 10, 2010; PAL: August 11, 2010; Xbox 360: WW: August 25, 2010; Complete Edition; NS, PS4, Stadia, Win, XBOX: WW: January 14, 2021
- Genres: Beat 'em up, action role-playing
- Modes: Single-player, multiplayer

Scott Pilgrim vs. The World: The Game is a side-scrolling beat 'em up game developed by Ubisoft Montreal and Ubisoft Chengdu and published by Ubisoft, based on the Scott Pilgrim series of Oni Press graphic novels by Bryan Lee O'Malley and tying in with the release of the film adaptation, Scott Pilgrim vs. the World (2010). The game was originally released digitally for Xbox 360 via Xbox Live Arcade and PlayStation 3 via PlayStation Network in August 2010 before being delisted in December 2014. An updated re-release for Nintendo Switch, PlayStation 4, Windows, Xbox One and Google Stadia titled Scott Pilgrim vs. The World: The Game – Complete Edition, was released on January 14, 2021.

== Gameplay ==
A screenshot of Knives, Wallace, Ramona and Scott in the game's fourth stage

Loosely following the story of the graphic novels, up to four players can play as Scott Pilgrim, Ramona Flowers, Kim Pine or Stephen Stills, along with the unlockable character NegaScott and the downloadable characters Knives Chau and Wallace Wells, who must battle through seven levels in order to defeat Ramona's seven evil exes. Characters have their own individual movesets, which can be expanded upon by gaining enough experience, and are also able to use weapons. Each player has Heart Points and Guts Points, the latter of which can revive players if they are knocked out, or be used to perform special moves such as summoning Knives or the unlockable assist character Mr. Chau. Defeating enemies earns coins which can be spent in shops to purchase items that can replenish health or boost stats. Certain items can be taken "to go" to be automatically used when the player runs out of health. Players can also enter Subspace areas which act as bonus areas where extra coins can be earned. During co-operative play, players can revive fallen comrades at the cost of some money, give each other health or money, and simultaneously taunt for a combined attack. Various cheat codes unlock extra features, such as a Sound Test, a Boss Rush and a Survival Horror mode.

== Development ==
Scott Pilgrim vs. the World: The Game was co-developed by Ubisoft Montreal and Ubisoft Chengdu. The game's art direction and animation was headed by Paul Robertson, whom the company contacted by e-mail. Robertson had previous experience working on the 5th Cell series Drawn to Life and created Pirate Baby's Cabana Battle Street Fight 2006, an animated side-scroller game based film. Robertson was responsible for designing and animating the game's sprites, effects, and other aspects. He felt he had "the most creative control" on any game he has worked on, but that he was still restricted by the source material, pleasing the publishers and producers, and programming limitations. Chiptune-based pop and rock band Anamanaguchi performed the soundtrack for the game. Bryan Lee O'Malley, Scott Pilgrim series creator, and Edgar Wright, director of the film adaptation, were also involved in development. O'Malley came to Ubisoft and discussed with the development team how the game's narrative and flow should be handled. He also drew several sketches on which the in-game cutscenes are based. According to O'Malley, he was initially approached by Telltale Games to make a Scott Pilgrim adventure game, but he declined as he could not see it as part of that genre. O'Malley designed the concept moves and specials of the playable characters and bosses. He began this in the Summer of 2009.

== Release ==
Scott Pilgrim vs. the World: The Game was first announced at San Diego Comic-Con on July 28, 2009. On June 8, 2010, Game Informer presented their first hands on, where it was revealed the game would be a timed exclusive for PlayStation Network, with an Xbox Live Arcade release at a later date. The first trailer for the game was released on June 11, 2010, which showed some of the stages in the game such as inside a club, on a street and noticeably inside a Toronto Transit Commission streetcar. The game makes various references to video games, such as River City Ransom, Mario, Kirby, Mega Man, and Guitar Hero. An early pitch video was revealed on August 11, 2010, which showcased even more retro graphics and direct parodies of classic games.

Scott Pilgrim-themed Avatar clothes and props were released on Xbox Live's Avatar Marketplace on August 12, 2010. The game's original soundtrack by Anamanaguchi was released on Amazon and iTunes by ABKCO Records in North America on August 24, 2010, and was released internationally on August 30, 2010. Downloadable content was released for the PSN version on November 9, 2010, to coincide with the film's DVD and Blu-ray Disc release, including Knives Chau as a playable character and two additional game modes: Battle Royal and Dodge Ball. The XBLA version was later released on December 28, 2010. A second DLC pack, which implements online multiplayer and adds Wallace Wells as a playable character, was scheduled for release on February 5, 2013, but the pack was delayed and eventually released on March 12, 2013 on PlayStation Network and on March 13, 2013 on Xbox Live Arcade.

On December 30, 2014, Scott Pilgrim vs. the World: The Game and its DLC were delisted from the Xbox Live Arcade and PlayStation Network, possibly due to the license expiring. In May 2020, approaching the film and game's 10 year anniversary, both O'Malley and Wright tweeted Ubisoft asking to bring the game back alongside a re-release of the film. In August 2020, O'Malley tweeted that Ubisoft has reached out to him. In September 2020, Ubisoft announced Scott Pilgrim vs. the World: The Game – Complete Edition, a remaster of the original game including both DLC packs' contents, for a January 14, 2021 release on Nintendo Switch, PlayStation 4, Windows, Xbox One, and Stadia. On January 8, 2021, it was revealed that Limited Run Games would release a physical version of the game, alongside several special edition releases with additional physical bonuses.

On June 6, 2025, a new Scott Pilgrim game, titled Scott Pilgrim EX, was announced to be in development by Tribute Games, a studio founded by members of the Scott Pilgrim vs. the World: The Game development team, with Anamanaguchi returning to compose the soundtrack. It features an original story written by Lee O'Malley, which takes place after the events of the Scott Pilgrim Takes Off anime series. The game was released on March 3, 2026.

== Reception ==
Reception

Aggregate score
Aggregator	Score	
Aggregator	PS3	Xbox 360
Metacritic	77/100	73/100

Review scores
Publication	Score	
Publication	PS3	Xbox 360
Destructoid	7.5/10	N/A
Edge	6/10	N/A
Eurogamer	7/10	N/A
Game Informer	9/10	N/A
GamePro	4.5/5	N/A
GameRevolution	B−	B−
GameSpot	6.5/10	6.5/10
GameTrailers	8.3/10	N/A
GameZone	7/10	N/A
IGN	8/10	8/10
Joystiq	5/5	N/A
Official Xbox Magazine (US)	N/A	8.5/10
PlayStation: The Official Magazine	8/10	N/A
The A.V. Club	B+	N/A
Metro	6/10	N/A

The PlayStation 3 version of Scott Pilgrim vs. the World: The Game received "generally favorable reviews", while the Xbox 360 version received "mixed or average" reviews, according to the review aggregation website Metacritic.

IGN praised the game's style and soundtrack but criticizing its lack of online multiplayer or drop-in play. They later named it the 25th best game on Xbox Live Arcade in 2010. Similarly, 1UP.com criticized the PS3 version's difficulty and need for grinding. Joystiq said of the same console version that "they couldn't recommend it any higher, especially at 10 bucks." Game Informer called the same console version "the best modern brawler since Castle Crashers."

GameTrailers called said PS3 version "an excellent pastiche that will reaffirm your love for classic beat-em-ups." Kotaku called it "an entertaining little old-school beat-em up that becomes exponentially more entertaining the more friends you play with." GameSpot said that the game is a bit too chaotic with four players on screen.

Prior to release, Scott Pilgrim vs. the World: The Game was nominated for Best Downloadable Game of E3 2010 by GameSpot. It was nominated for Best Downloadable Game and won Best Adapted Video Game at the 2010 Spike Video Game Awards.

In 2023, Time Extension included Complete Edition on their top 25 "Best Beat 'Em Ups of All Time" list.

== Soundtrack ==
Scott Pilgrim vs. the World: The Game – Original Videogame Soundtrack

Soundtrack album by Anamanaguchi
- Released: August 24, 2010
- Genres: Video game music; soundtrack; chiptune
- Length: 46:00
- Label: ABKCO

Anamanaguchi chronology
Dawn Metropolis (2009)	Scott Pilgrim vs. the World: The Game – Original Videogame Soundtrack (2010)	Single + Remix Collections (2012)

The soundtrack for Ubisoft's Scott Pilgrim vs. the World: The Game was written, composed and performed by Anamanaguchi. The digital soundtrack was released by ABKCO Records on August 24, 2010.

=== Reception ===
In their review of Scott Pilgrim vs. the World: The Game, IGN called Anamanaguchi's soundtrack "possibly the best soundtrack on PS3". AllMusic reviewer Heather Phares, giving it 4 out of 5 stars, said that Anamanaguchi "serve up hyperkinetic tracks that sound like they’ve been hiding on an NES cartridge for a quarter century", and was impressed that the film production chose to "provide such a distinct aesthetic for a game’s music".

The album debuted at #3 on Billboard's Heatseekers Albums chart in the September 11, 2010 issue.

=== Charts ===
Chart	Peak position
US Heatseekers Albums (Billboard)	3
US Top Dance Albums (Billboard)	7
US Soundtrack Albums (Billboard)	13
US Billboard 200	180
US Top Album Sales (Billboard)	180
