= Capsule Silence XXIV =

2016 video game and album

- The game's splash screen, featuring the logo of Anamanaguchi and fictional disclaimer text.
- Designers: Ben Esposito; Anamanaguchi
- Platforms: Windows macOS
- Release: 28 March 2016
- Mode: Single-player

Capsule Silence XXIV is a 2016 experimental video game by independent developer Ben Esposito and the chiptune band Anamanaguchi which incorporates an album. In the game, players explore a world modelled after the band, collecting cassette tapes which the player can listen to and download. Before its release, Esposito and Anamanaguchi staged a fictional dispute between the band and their publisher depicting a conflict over the game, which was described as a large-scale multi-million dollar title.

== Gameplay ==
Capsule Silence XXIV is initially presented as a high-production "multi-million dollar" AAA game, of which the player navigates a short and incomplete level. At the end, they have to use a gun against an orc, but it fails to shoot bullets due to a purported software bug in the game, prompting the player to find an alternate solution. By accessing the developer console, they gain access to another level, an "architectural palace" containing the personal effects of the band members — Peter, Luke, Ary, and James — each of which has a separate room. The player can discover pictures, notes, fictional emails, and easter eggs located throughout the level.

By navigating the structure and solving puzzles, the player can obtain 35 cassette tapes with new music by the band, which the player can place into a frog-like robot, F.R.U.G., to listen to them. These cassettes can also be placed in slots on a wall; once ten are inserted, the player can use a file converter to download their respective tracks as MP3 files. As the converter is "broken", multiple playthroughs of the game are required to obtain the complete set of music, which makes up an album by Anamanaguchi.

== Background and development ==
Peter Berkman of Anamanaguchi met Ben Esposito at SXSW in 2014. At the time, the band had released their album Endless Fantasy, but wanted to avoid the repetitive release cycle that was required to stay relevant on platforms like SoundCloud. Esposito had been involved in experimental games by Arcane Kids such as Bubsy 3D: Bubsy Visits the James Turrell Retrospective and Sonic Dreams Collection. Berkman proposed the idea of a virtual world in which players could navigate the band members' rooms to discover music, and Esposito decided to package it in a game-within-a-game to avoid a feeling of voyeurism. The former then came up with the idea of staging the dispute with their publisher; Esposito later stated that the events "got a little bit out of control".

Esposito described creating the virtual world as akin to creating a "documentary", conducting phone interviews with each member of the band to determine the contents of their rooms. He designed the levels and programmed the game, with Jordan Speer making some of the 3D models, and Anamanaguchi contributing the music and some of the artwork. The soundtrack for the game was initially intended to comprise Anamanaguchi's next album [USA], which was eventually released using completely new work.

== Release ==
The game was first announced via a staged leak on 4chan of a fictional internal PDF containing promotional imagery. It was said to be in development for years under the title "Project Homunculus", with a $33 million budget.

Before release, Anamanaguchi got GameSpot to successfully run a preview, describing it as high-production title featuring the members of the band. The game's fictional publisher, NHX, called it as a "story-based world-exploration FPS with RPG elements" with "music at the core of the experience." According to the plot given to GameSpot, the player took the role of the orphan Larold, who has to navigate the game world and save the four members of Anamanaguchi.

After the article was published, Anamanaguchi sent a number of angry messages on Twitter criticising NHX, including leaked emails. To add authenticity to the dispute, Esposito publicly messaged them in his role as a game designer, telling them that he was "DMing you right now". Following their tweets, the band "leaked" the game, releasing it for free. They then deleted their Twitter archives, and pretended to place the account under control of their manager.

== Reception ==
In his listing of the top games of 2016, Boing Boing writer Brandon Boyer praised the game as "one of the most intriguing experiences of the year", describing its creators as "some of the best people working in both music and games". Polygon writers Griffin McElroy and Nick Robinson described it as a "treat" that made them "musically richer than we ever could have dreamed".

Some fans perceived it as a distraction from the band's next album [USA]. GameSpot's senior editor Justin Hayward later criticised Anamanaguchi for their actions, stating that they expected "honest views and opinions, and it's a breach of trust when someone takes advantage of that."

== Track listing ==
"Voyeur Mixtape" and "Sweet Sunset Loop" are exclusive to the Bandcamp release, which is presented as a single volume.

Capsule Silence XXIV (Original Soundtrack) track listing
No.	Title	Length
1.	"Promotional Audio 1"	1:02
2.	"Capsule Silence"	2:39
3.	"F.R.U.G."	3:47
4.	"FEELGOOD LAST ONE SEEEEERSLY"	3:00
5.	"PMDawn"	3:12
6.	"Pearl"	2:59
7.	"E-Mode"	2:32
8.	"Strawberry Love" (with Amy Cakes)	3:26
9.	"Poisonous Gas"	3:07
10.	"PCJ"	1:50
11.	"Time Moves On"	3:02
12.	"My Heart My Body"	4:36
13.	"Lilo" (with Lindsay Lowend)	3:02
14.	"Phase2X"	3:01
15.	"Thinking About U"	4:02
16.	"Promotional Audio 2"	0:36
Total length:		45:53

Capsule Silence XXIV (Original Soundtrack, Vol. II) track listing
No.	Title	Length
1.	"Crash (Crashed)"	3:07
2.	"Rush"	2:52
3.	"Gentle Anxious"	3:35
4.	"Gurli"	4:04
5.	"Toi et Moi"	1:48
6.	"When Yr Around"	3:05
7.	"H4rdcore Secret"	3:31
8.	"9498123980000"	5:28
9.	"Just Dive"	4:08
10.	"5AM EST"	2:07
11.	"Miami Potato"	2:25
12.	"1000"	1:11
13.	"Swan"	2:42
14.	"Unalive"	4:04
15.	"Forrest Walk"	2:10
16.	"♥"	7:45
17.	"Ur Crazy 4 Dis 1"	1:50
18.	"Glass"	2:19
19.	"XS"	3:02
Total length:		1:01:13
