= Sabrepulse =

English chiptune musician

Sabrepulse (Ashley Charles)
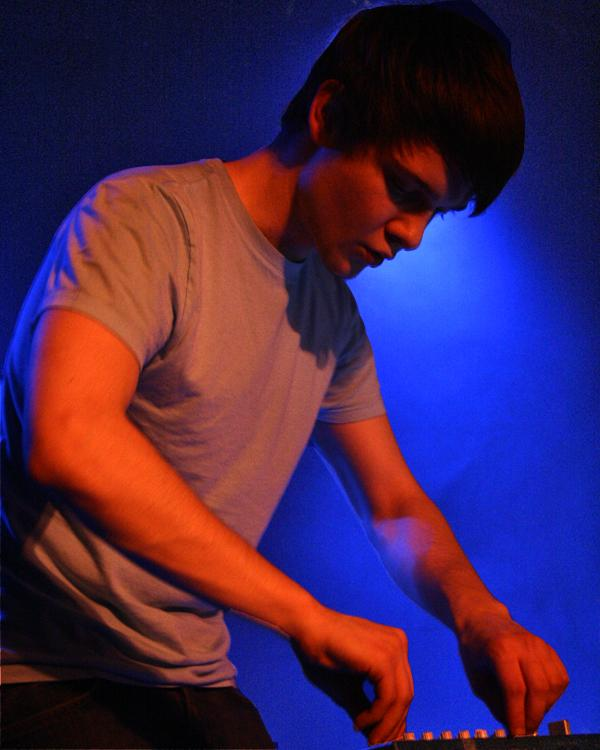
- Sabrepulse playing at Strathclyde Union, Glasgow in 2007.

Background information
- Born: Ashley Charles Eskrett
- Origin: Kingston upon Hull, England
- Genres: Chiptune; chipbreak; breakcore; dubstep; drum and bass; drumstep
- Years active: 2005 – present
- Labels: 8bitpeoples Give Daddy The Knife; Merryworks
- Website: sabrepulse.bandcamp.com

Ashley Charles Eskrett, better known as Sabrepulse, is an English chiptune musician from Kingston upon Hull, England and founded the solo project in 2001. He is often cited as being one of the pioneers of the genre known as chipbreak, a fusion of chiptune and breakcore.

He founded the solo project Sabrepulse in late 2001 to release his remixes of vintage video game music.

== Discography ==
=== Albums ===
- Famicom Connection (2005)
- Chipbreak Wars (2006)
- Verão (2007), derived from Portuguese
- Turbo City (2008)
- Untitled (2009)
- Blood Eagle (2015)
- Paragon (2015)
- Exile (2018)
- Says Goodbye (2026)

=== EPs ===
- Says Hello (2004)
- Terra EP (2005)
- Titan EP (2006)
- Nintendokore EP (2006)
- First Crush EP (2011)
- Bit Pilot OST (2011)
- Ender (2022)
- Second Crush (2025)
- Fakebit Meridian (2025)
- Third Crush (2025)
- Zetetic (2025)
- Eve (2026)
- Walk With Me EP (2026)

=== Singles ===
- "Close To Me" (2011)

=== Remix albums ===
- Blood Eagle (The Remixes) (2015)

=== Other ===
- "We Are Hi-Speed" on GDTK Sampler (2006)
- Xinon VS Sabrepulse: Realization (2007)
- "Lightspeed Disco" on Crunchy Records Compilation 2008 (2008)
- "Digital Love" on Da Chip Volume 2 (2012)

=== Compilations ===
- Terra & Titan (2014)

=== Remixes ===
Year	Track	Original Artist	Album
2014	"Precious Jewel"	Knife City	Precious Jewel
2015	"Show Me"	Trey Frey	Très Frais

=== Production credits ===
Year	Track	Artist	Album
2014	"Endless Fantasy"	Anamanaguchi	Endless Fantasy
2014	"Bosozoku GF"	Anamanaguchi	Endless Fantasy
2014	"Cyberstrike"	Shirobon	The Arcade Dream
