= PsychoWarrior: MG Ultra X =

Studio album by Machine Girl
- Released: October 24, 2025
- Genres: Hardcore; noise; EBM; noise rock; digital hardcore
- Length: 47:27
- Label: Future Classic
- Producer: Matthew Stephenson

Machine Girl chronology
MG Ultra (2024)	PsychoWarrior: MG Ultra X (2025)	PsychoWarrior: MG Ultra X: The Remixes [Minus One] (2026)

Singles from PsychoWarrior: MG Ultra X
- 1. "Come On Baby, Scrape My Data" Released: August 15, 2025; 2. "Rabbit Season" Released: September 5, 2025; 3. "Dread Architect" Released: October 10, 2025

PsychoWarrior: MG Ultra X is the seventh studio album by American electronic band Machine Girl, first released on October 24, 2025 via Future Classic. Three singles preceded the album, all with music videos, "Come On Baby, Scrape My Data", "Rabbit Season", and "Dread Architect." The album received a companion remix album titled PsychoWarrior: MG Ultra X: The Remix [Minus One] on April 3, 2026.

== Background ==
The album has been described as a sequel of sorts to their previous album MG Ultra (2024), with themes of psychological damage, culture, society, and a collective unconscious. Elaborating on this, front man Matt Stephenson stated:

“I’d been reading analytical psychology and the writings of Joseph Campbell and Jung. There’s a concept of the collective unconscious and these archetypes that we innately have. We adopt different personae in order to get through the day. In essence, you complete yourself by facing your shadow self. To do so, you must accept the less savory aspects of who you are. There’s a lot of validity to these theories. Right now, we’re a very psychologically damaged culture and society. We’re being pushed over the edge with social media and technology. Any chance of resistance against these systems starts in the mind, so this was the genesis of PsychoWarrior: MG Ultra X.”

== Reception ==
Colin Joyce of Pitchfork gave the album a 7.5, stating that the album fights "overstimulation with more overstimulation" over 14 tracks of "choppy, distorted, digitally thrashed mutations of noise, EBM, and hardcore." Moreover, comparing the albums themes of culture and society to the Neon White soundtrack, composed by Machine Girl. They also highlighted the eclecticism of the record, noting influences of "noise rock, nightcore-d EBM, hardcore (of both the punk and techno variety), and other extreme music microgenres—often jumpcutting between sounds and styles within a single track."

Jordan Darville of The Fader highlighted an increased influence from noise rock and metal on the record, giving the songs a "new kind of visceral feeling." Specific songs they stated stood out include the post-punk influenced "Psychowar" and "ID Crisis Angel" and "Phantom Doom", which they said blended Machine Girl's traditional glitchy production with "tragic shoegaze." Overall, they believed that the increased amount of influences made the album, and band, feel "rejuvenated, like a new battery has been improbably out of our trash island world."

== Track listing ==
PsychoWarrior: MG Ultra X track listing
No.	Title	Length
1.	"We Don't Give a Fuck"	3:21
2.	"Come On Baby, Scrape My Data"	3:02
3.	"Ignore the Vore"	3:58
4.	"Rabbit Season"	4:02
5.	"Creeping Up From the Pit"	2:13
6.	"Psychowar"	5:41
7.	"Innermission"	2:22
8.	"Dual Wield"	2:54
9.	"ID Crisis Angel"	1:28
10.	"Down to the Essence"	3:01
11.	"Despite Having No Money at All I’m Just Another Rat in the Mall"	2:45
12.	"Phantom Doom"	3:09
13.	"Dread Architect"	5:02
14.	"i-Void Destroyer"	4:29
Total length:		47:27

== Personnel ==
Credits adapted from Bandcamp.

- Keith Rankin – album artwork
- Nicos Kennedy – mixing
- Beau Thomas – mastering
