= Scott Pilgrim (disambiguation) =

Scott Pilgrim is a Canadian comic book series.

Scott Pilgrim may also refer to:

- Scott Pilgrim vs. the World, a 2010 film which adapts the series
  - Scott Pilgrim vs. the World, the film's soundtrack
  - Scott Pilgrim vs. the World: The Game, a video game based on the film
- Scott Pilgrim Takes Off, a 2023 anime series
  - Scott Pilgrim Takes Off, the series' soundtrack
- Scott Pilgrim EX, a 2026 video game
- Scott Pilgrim, the titular protagonist of the series
- "Scott Pilgrim", a song by Plumtree
