= Miku (song) =

2016 single by Anamanaguchi

Single by Anamanaguchi featuring Hatsune Miku
- Released: May 24, 2016
- Genre: Pop
- Length: 3:43
- Label: NHX, Polyvinyl
- Songwriters: Ary Warnaar, James DeVito, Luke Silas, Peter Joseph Berkman

Anamanaguchi singles chronology
"Pop It" (2014)	"Miku" (2016)	"Lorem Ipsum (Arctic Anthem)" (2019)

"Miku" is a song by the American chiptune band Anamanaguchi featuring the digital Vocaloid singer Hatsune Miku. It was released on May 24, 2016, through NHX. After talking with Vocaloid creators Crypton Future Media, Anamanaguchi agreed to tour with Miku and create an original song with the singer; the band also worked on the song's choreography. It was added to the North American set list of the Miku Expo tour in 2016, in which Anamanaguchi was an opening act. In 2022, it was issued on vinyl by Polyvinyl.

== Background and composition ==
"Miku" was created as a collaboration between Anamanaguchi and Crypton Future Media, the company who created the virtual Vocaloid singer Hatsune Miku. It was written by all Anamanaguchi members. Anamanaguchi came into contact with Crypton Future Media's staff in 2015 at the Anime Expo in Los Angeles. After conversations, they agreed that the band would tour with Miku and create an original song with her.

Anamanaguchi began working on "Miku" in a Chinatown basement, and it was finished in Tokyo. According to guitarist Ary Warnaar, the process was similar to working with a singer, but different because it was actually software. He also mentioned Anamanaguchi imagined how it would be if Hatsune Miku was with them at the studio; Warnaar stated: "There were many days in the studio where I felt like I had been talking with someone all day, but I hadn't". They also worked on the choreography Miku would perform on stage, which had to be arranged to work with the character's model. Inspired by the duo AyaBambi, the process also involved help from Anamanaguchi member Luke Silas, who is also a dancer. "Miku" was added to the set list of the North American leg of the Miku Expo tour in 2016, in which Anamanaguchi was an opening act.

According to Warnaar, the song is "ridiculously catchy to the point of almost being unsettling". Anamanaguchi member Peter Berkman says they created "Miku" as a "catch-all 'theme song'" for her, with a Daily Dot writer adding that it was also "a thank-you note to fans". According to Zara Golden of The Fader, the lyrics depict Miku amid "an existential tailspin of sorts, considering ... her purpose and being", as she sings: "Miku, Miku, what's it like to be you?". Lizzie Plaugic of The Verge described it as a bouncy pop track.

== Release and reception ==
"Miku" was released as a single on May 24, 2016, through NHX, amid the Miku Expo 2016 tour. Vice's Rachel Kraus praised "the bubblegum electro vocal hook's ability to stick in your head and stay there interminably", while calling it "a rather odd, but possibly revolutionary, collaboration". Following the tour and the virality of "Miku", Anamanaguchi released S/S17, a collection of remixes of the song, including a Japanese version, on March 24, 2017. Warnaar felt that it would be logical for Hatsune Miku to sing the track in her native language. The original song's lyrics were translated to Japanese with the help of Sarah Midori Perry from Kero Kero Bonito. Kraus felt it was even more captivating than the original.

On July 22, 2022, Polyvinyl released "Miku" on vinyl, including the original song and eight bonus versions. "Miku" was added to the video game Fortnite on January 14, 2025 as a Jam Track, as part of Fortnite Festival Season 7, and a portion is used in the "Miku Live" emote.

== Track listing ==
Adapted from Bandcamp and vinyl liner notes.

Side 1

1. "Miku" – 3:43
2. "Miku" (Japanese version) – 3:38
3. "Miku" (NES remix) – 3:51
4. "Miku" (LLLL remix) – 4:06

Side 2

5. "Miku" (Carpainter remix) – 3:48
6. "Miku" (Ben Aqua remix) – 3:51
7. "Miku" (Mino Mino remix) – 2:45
8. "Miku" (Lazerdisk remix) – 3:21
9. "Miku" (instrumental) – 3:43
