= Zineth =

2012 video game

- Developer: Arcane Kids
- Publisher: Arcane Kids
- Engine: Unity
- Platforms: Windows, Mac
- Release: 2012
- Mode: Single-player

Zineth is a 3D skating freeware video game by independent developer Arcane Kids released for Microsoft Windows and Mac in 2012.

== Gameplay ==
Zineth takes place in a dystopian future in which the entire world has been "absorbed by a mobile game", resulting in the brainwashing of all of its inhabitants. The player controls a magazine deliverer who must deliver "'zines" to people in order to show them what real life is like.

== Development ==
Zineth originally began development as a student thesis project in experimental game design at the Rensselaer Polytechnic Institute, worked on by a team of 7 developers. Co-creator Jacob Knipfing cited inspiration from many Dreamcast games such as Jet Set Radio and Rez.

It began development in late March 2012, and was later released in early August of that year. Described as "a student game made over a few months meant to celebrate speed, movement, and twitter," it has the player traverse through various environments at high speeds, all the while completing missions provided by other characters in order to earn cash. A cell phone is consistently present on the player's screen and incorporated into the game, used to receive missions as well as play other games contained within the phone, with inspiration taken from free-to-play Flash games and RPGs. Twitter is also prominently featured as an aspect; players can use it to take in-game pictures using the phone and tweet them.

The game's title is a play-on words of the terms "zine" (short for magazine) and "zenith". Upon launching the game shows disclaimer about the controller it was intended for, which is a reference to Jet Set Radio PC remaster complaints, when players attempted to use keyboard instead of usual controller and had problems with walkthrough.

== Reception ==
In 2013 Zineth won an award at the Independent Games Festival for best student game.
