= Scott Pilgrim Takes Off (soundtrack) =

Scott Pilgrim Takes Off (Soundtrack from the Netflix Series)

Soundtrack album by Anamanaguchi and Joseph Trapanese
- Released: November 17, 2023
- Recorded: 2023
- Length: 76:08
- Label: Lakeshore
- Producers: Anamanaguchi; Joseph Trapanese; Bryan Lee O'Malley; BenDavid Grabinski

Anamanaguchi chronology
USA (2019)	Scott Pilgrim Takes Off (Soundtrack from the Netflix Series) (2023)

Joseph Trapanese chronology
No One Will Save You (2023)	Scott Pilgrim Takes Off (2023)	The Witcher: Sirens of the Deep (2025)

Singles from Scott Pilgrim Takes Off (Soundtrack from the Netflix Series)
- 1. "Techno Syndrome" Released: January 18, 2024

Scott Pilgrim Takes Off (Soundtrack from the Netflix Series) is the soundtrack to the 2023 Netflix television series Scott Pilgrim Takes Off, released through Lakeshore Records on November 17, 2023, the same day as the series' premiere. The soundtrack album featured songs written for the film and original score composed by Anamanaguchi and Joseph Trapanese.

Scott Pilgrim Takes Off is based on the graphic novels of the same name written and drawn by Bryan Lee O'Malley, who jointly developed and created the show with BenDavid Grabinski. The entire main cast from the 2010 film adaptation, Scott Pilgrim vs. the World, reprised the roles for the English voice cast.

The album was jointly produced by O'Malley and Grabinski who assisted the composers on the music production while also providing vocal demos for the band in lieu of the songs performed by the fictional Sex Bob-Omb band. It also covered licensed music as heard in the film, despite being excluded in the soundtrack. Post the album's release, the band's cover of "Techno Syndrome" released as a digital single on January 18, 2024.

== Background ==
On March 30, 2023, it was reported that the chiptune-based band Anamanaguchi and Joseph Trapanese would write, compose and produce music for Scott Pilgrim Takes Off. The band initially composed music for the video game adaptation of Scott Pilgrim vs. the World (2010). Since music being a forefront of the Scott Pilgrim series, O'Malley and Grabinski eventually wanted it to match with the vibe of the animation, which resulted in the Trapanese and the band's involvement as it would perfectly fit with the vibe they needed.

O'Malley and Grabinski ensured that the music should not overlap with the writing process while it had comprised the difficult sequences in the series. They eventually assisted Trapanese and Anamanaguchi and co-produced the songs with them; O'Malley did vocal demos for some of the songs for the Sex Bob-Omb band. The series incorporated licensed music that covered several artists' contributions such as Johnny Cash, Dead Kennedys, Stephen Sondheim which Grabinski described it as a "wild mix of music". The show's opening theme, "Bloom" was performed by Japanese rock band Necry Talkie. Song orchestrations were by Nathan Kelly.

== Marketing and release ==
The soundtrack album features 45 tracks which consisted of original and few licensed songs, and the band's and Trapanese's score accompanied the remainder of the album, along with 18 bonus tracks. Two of the songs "Meeting Ramona" and "Orange Shirt" (credited to Sex Bob-Omb) was previewed exclusively at Stereogum on November 15.

On August 17, 2023, the band Anamanaguchi announced that they are going to perform the songs live to promote the film's release and distributed the tickets at the Time Out magazine's online website priced at $30–50. The band eventually performed the songs at the special Scott Pilgrim Takes Off concert held at Pellissier Building and Wiltern Theatre in Los Angeles in conjunction with the series and its soundtrack release on November 17. Momma and James Ivy served as the chief guests.

The band's cover of "Techno Syndrome" from Mortal Kombat: The Album (1994) was released as a single on January 18, 2024.

== Critical reception ==
Allison Hermann of Variety described the soundtrack and the theme song as an "earworm". Marc Ciafardani of Go See Talk wrote "High fives and golf claps to Trapanese and Anamanaguchi whose efforts help make this world so much fun to dive into with headphones or house-sized speakers." Nicholas Quah of Vulture wrote "The original songs by Anamanaguchi, who also did the music for the video game, are superb." Daniel Fienberg of The Hollywood Reporter wrote "the energy is tremendously boosted by the music by Joseph Trapanese and Anamanaguchi and a properly kick-ass soundtrack". William Hughes of The A.V. Club wrote the series' "blends the film's still-impeccable soundtrack with new and old music from Anamanaguchi". Kambole Campbell of Little White Lies wrote "Sex-Bob-Omb's songs are still scrappy but catchy, and the composers [Anamanaguchi and Joseph Trapanese] have other delightful surprises in store."

== Track listing ==
Scott Pilgrim Takes Off (Soundtrack from the Netflix Series) track listing
No.	Title	Artist(s)	Length
1.	"I Feel Fine, Pt. 1"	Sex Bob-Omb	0:56
2.	"Orange Shirt"	Sex Bob-Omb	0:42
3.	"I Will Remember You"	Emily Haines; The Soft Skeleton	2:02
4.	"Sometimes Bad Guys Turn Into Great Guys"	Scott Pilgrim	0:32
5.	"Konya Wa Hurricane"	Pop'n TwinBee	0:49
6.	"Scott Pilgrim's Precious Little Overture"	Original Scott Pilgrim Off-Broadway Orchestra	0:31
7.	"Scott Pilgrim's Precious Little Musical"	Original Scott Pilgrim Off-Broadway Cast	1:38
8.	"I Feel Fine, Pt. 2"	Sex Bob-Omb	0:38
9.	"Subspace"		1:14
10.	"Waiting for the DVD"		0:24
11.	"Meeting Ramona"		1:01
12.	"Date"		1:20
13.	"Ramona's Apartment"		1:32
14.	"Gonna Kill Him"		1:20
15.	"Fond Memories"		1:39
16.	"Detective Flowers"		1:03
17.	"Investigation Continues"		0:32
18.	"Knives & Kim"		1:11
19.	"Matthew Patel"		0:43
20.	"Messing with a CEO"		5:26
21.	"They Dated"		1:05
22.	"Roxie & Ramona Fight"		3:15
23.	"And They Were Roommates"		1:24
24.	"Blame It On the Goose"		1:23
25.	"Billionaire"		0:30
26.	"Paparazzi"		1:08
27.	"Lucas Memories"		0:58
28.	"Well Well Wells"		1:25
29.	"Character Assassination"		1:30
30.	"Goose's Origin"		1:02
31.	"Bad Guys"		0:40
32.	"The How"		1:50
33.	"The When"		1:18
34.	"Timewarp"		1:05
35.	"Virtual Boy Suite"		1:42
36.	"Yet Another Winter Again"		1:16
37.	"Future Psych"		0:25
38.	"Sorry"		0:53
39.	"Evil Exes Arrival"		1:35
40.	"Big Bad"		2:53
41.	"Backup Plan"		0:52
42.	"He's You"		0:50
43.	"Shoelaces" (Trailer Version)		0:53
44.	"Sonic 3"		1:36
45.	"God Only Knows"		2:56
Total length:			59:37

Scott Pilgrim Takes Off (Soundtrack from the Netflix Series) bonus tracks
No.	Title	Length
46.	"Neil Console"	0:55
47.	"Young Neil Gaming"	1:08
48.	"Walk Home"	0:14
49.	"Fight"	1:02
50.	"Limo Music"	1:07
51.	"Very Soft Evil Dark"	3:42
52.	"Writer's Block"	0:43
53.	"In My Kart"	0:47
54.	"Detective Flowers 2"	0:39
55.	"Todd Mystery"	0:49
56.	"I'm Ramona Flowers"	1:03
57.	"Sparks"	0:40
58.	"Todd Flashback"	0:27
59.	"The Actor"	0:20
60.	"Envy and Todd Passion Takes"	0:59
61.	"It's the Twins"	0:49
62.	"Bad Husband"	0:46
63.	"We Did It"	0:21
Total length:		76:08

== Chart performance ==
Chart performance for Scott Pilgrim Takes Off (Soundtrack from the Netflix Series)
Chart (2024)	Peak position
UK Soundtrack Albums (OCC)	34

== Release history ==
Release dates and formats for Scott Pilgrim Takes Off (Soundtrack from the Netflix Series)
Region	Date	Format(s)	Label	Ref.
Various	November 17, 2023	Digital download; streaming	Lakeshore	
Various	January 12, 2024	Vinyl	Lakeshore	
