= Machine Girl =

American electronic music group

- Matt Stephenson of Machine Girl crowd surfing at The Crofoot in 2024

Background information
- Origin: Long Island, New York, U.S.
- Genres: Electronic; digital hardcore; drum and bass; footwork; industrial
- Years active: 2012–present
- Labels: Future Classic; Visual Disturbances; Kitty On Fire; Orange Milk; FREQ
- Members: Matt Stephenson; Sean Kelly; Lucy Caputi
- Website: machin3gir1.com

Machine Girl (sometimes stylized as machin3gir1) is an American electronic music project created in 2012 by Matt Stephenson (also known as DJ Chaotic Ugly) on Long Island, New York. In 2015, the project became a duo, with Stephenson recruiting percussionist Sean Kelly to play live drums. Lucy Caputi joined in 2024 as a live guitarist and official member of the band.

In 2022, Machine Girl composed the original soundtrack for the video game Neon White, coming in two parts—"The Wicked Heart" and "The Burn That Cures"—in link with the scenario of the game.

== Style and themes ==
In an interview with Revolver magazine, Stephenson defined Machine Girl as "fucked-up electronic punk" and stated that they did not like the "industrial" tag for being "very goth, and very black and white" considering the project "a lot more colorful". Kerrang! listed them as one of the "bands expanding the definition of hardcore", and described the project as "a particularly punky and ferocious breed of the electronic sub-genre breakcore that could easily pass for hardcore when they rip it live". Pitchfork defined their style as "relentlessly smashing together bits of punk, grindcore, rave, industrial, and more" and "unpredictable and dangerous, full of animalistic rage and uncontrollable energy".

The project is named after the 2008 Japanese film The Machine Girl, which they occasionally sampled on their 2014 album WLFGRL.

== Other projects ==
Stephenson is also a member of the electronic duo Prolaps with Bonnie Baxter from Kill Alters. Originally collaborating on the track "Vomit" from ...Because I'm Young Arrogant and Hate Everything You Stand For, they began releasing music in 2020.

== Members ==
- Matthew Stephenson – production, bass guitar, vocals (2012–present)
- Sean Kelly – drums (2015–present)
- Lucy Caputi – guitar, vocals (2024–present)

== Discography ==
=== Studio albums ===
Title	Album details
WLFGRL	Released: February 17, 2014; Label: Dred Collective, Orange Milk (2021 vinyl release), Future Classic (10th Anniversary); Format: LP, CD, digital download, streaming
Gemini	Released: July 3, 2015; Label: Orange Milk; Format: LP, cassette, digital download, streaming
...Because I'm Young Arrogant and Hate Everything You Stand For	Released: September 22, 2017; Label: Orange Milk; Format: LP, cassette, digital download, streaming
The Ugly Art	Released: October 12, 2018; Label: Kitty on Fire, Future Classic (2026 LP & CD release); Format: LP, CD, Cassette, digital download, streaming
U-Void Synthesizer	Released: February 26, 2020; Label: Self-released, Orange Milk (2023 vinyl release); Format: LP, cassette, digital download, streaming
MG Ultra	Released: October 18, 2024; Label: Future Classic; Format: LP, CD, digital download, streaming
PsychoWarrior: MG Ultra X	Released: October 24, 2025; Label: Future Classic; Format: LP, CD, digital download, streaming

=== Extended plays ===
Title	EP details
Electronic Gimp Music	Released: March 21, 2013; Label: Self-released; Format: Digital download
13th Hour	Released: August 19, 2013; Label: Self-released; Format: Digital download
GRLPWR EP	Released: November 28, 2013; Label: Self-released; Format: Digital download
Machine Girl vs Machine Girl	Released: November 29, 2016; Label: Self-released; Format: Digital download, streaming
RePorpoised Phantasies	Released: July 3, 2020; Label: Self-released; Format: Digital download, streaming
Super FREQ EP	Released: April 15, 2024; Label: FREQ; Format: 12" EP, digital download, streaming

=== Compilations ===
Title	Album details
Jet Set Radio Remixes 1	Released: March 6, 2014; Label: Self-released; Format: Digital download
WLFGRL Remixes A	Released: April 3, 2014; Label: Dred Collective; Format: Digital download
WLFGRL Remixes B	Released: April 3, 2014; Label: Dred Collective; Format: Digital download
Phantom Tracks	Released: February 21, 2015; Label: Self-released; Format: Digital download
Phantasy Trax™	Released: April 11, 2016; Label: Self-released; Format: Digital download
WLFGRL+	Released: December 27, 2017; Label: Self-released; Format: Digital download
MG Demo Disc	Released: February 9, 2020; Label: Self-released; Format: Digital download, streaming
Stretch Collection	Released: October 12, 2020; Label: Self-released; Format: Digital download
MG Ultra (Remixes)	Released: March 7, 2025; Label: Future Classic; Format: Digital download, streaming
PsychoWarrior: MG Ultra X: The Remixes [Minus One]	Released: April 3, 2026; Label: Future Classic; Format: Digital download, streaming

=== Singles ===
Title	Year	Album
"Gravity Diva"	2012	Non-album singles
"Emerald Juke / Krystle (Glitch Mix)"	2014	Non-album singles
"Killing of the Bird / Lifeforce"	2015	Non-album singles
"Costume / Fuqthatlil"	2016	Non-album singles
"Minnesota / Explode"	2016	Non-album singles
"Bitten Twice"	2017	...Because I'm Young Arrogant and Hate Everything You Stand For
"Sad Claps"	2017	...Because I'm Young Arrogant and Hate Everything You Stand For
"Concerning Peace (Machine Girl Remix)" (with Special Interest)	2023	Endured (Remixed)
"Until I Die"	2024	MG Ultra
"Motherfather"	2024	MG Ultra
"Psychic Attack"	2024	MG Ultra
"Ass2Mars (Squarepusher Remix)"	2025	MG Ultra (Remixes)
"Ass2Mars (LSDXOXO Remix)"	2025	MG Ultra (Remixes)
"Come On Baby, Scrape My Data"	2025	PsychoWarrior: MG Ultra X
"Rabbit Season"	2025	PsychoWarrior: MG Ultra X
"Dread Architect" (with Drumcorps)	2025	PsychoWarrior: MG Ultra X
Come on Baby, Scrape My Data (DJ Smokey Remix)"	2026	PsychoWarrior: MG Ultra X: The Remixes [Minus One]
"Dual Wield (femtanyl Remix)"	2026	PsychoWarrior: MG Ultra X: The Remixes [Minus One]

=== Splits and collaborative releases ===
Title	Album details
Darren Keen + Machine Girl (with Darren Keen)	Released: September 30, 2014; Label: Them Flavors; Format: Digital download
Machine Girl / Five Star Hotel (with Five Star Hotel)	Released: October 31, 2016; Label: Visual Disturbances; Format: Cassette, digital download, streaming
QUARANTINETAPES_vol3 (with Shade)	Released: June 29, 2020; Label: Self-released; Format: Cassette

=== Mix compilations ===
Title	Album details
MRK90 Mix Vol. 1	Released: December 16, 2017; Label: Self-released, Future Classic (2025 CD release); Format: CD, cassette, digital download

=== Soundtracks ===
Title	Album details
Neon White Soundtrack Part 1 "The Wicked Heart"	Released: June 16, 2022; Label: Self-released, iam8bit (2024 vinyl release); Format: LP, digital download, streaming
Neon White Soundtrack Part 2 "The Burn That Cures"	Released: June 16, 2022; Label: Self-released, iam8bit (2024 vinyl release); Format: LP, digital download, streaming

== Music videos ==
In 2013, Machine Girl began releasing self-directed videos to their YouTube channel. This began with the unfinished song "~*•°•.[g0o∂]_[∫3º¥].•°•*~", the video for which was released on December 20, 2013. Their next upload was on February 7, 2014, when they uploaded a video for the song "Ginger Claps", 9 days before their debut album WLFGRL was released.

On November 4, 2014, Machine Girl posted a video titled "___________DJPH11252014". This video acted as an advertisement for a DJ performance at a venue titled "DJ PHANTASY CLUB", featuring sets by ABSRDST, Doss, DV-i, Ducky, Machine Girl, Ligaments, Legion, and The Magick Report. Notably, the beginning of the video contains a snippet of an early mix of the song "Loop Version", which would eventually be released on their 2018 album The Ugly Art.

On July 31, 2015, Machine Girl published two videos titled "HEAVEN MIX" and "HELL MIX", respectively. These two videos contained visuals by Videopunks, and included snippets of each side of their sophomore album Gemini.

The next official music video to be uploaded to the channel was for their song "Bitten Twice", released May 16, 2017. It was followed by a video for the song "Sad Claps", released on June 12, 2017.

While continuing to upload visualisers for various projects (including ...Because I'm Young Arrogant and Hate Everything You Stand For (September 24, 2017), MRK90 MIX VOL 1 (December 17, 2017) and The Ugly Art (October 14, 2018)), the next music video to be published premiered on August 28, 2020, for the song "Fully In It", featuring a stop motion animation by Ellie Thatcher.

On November 15, 2020, Machine Girl posted a video titled "GLOBAL FANDEMIC [MACHINE GIRL SET @ A2B2 NIGHT OF FIRE]", a live performance as part of a 24-hour virtual music festival hosted by Andy Morin of a2b2. The video consisted of Matt performing over fan-submitted visualisers, and contained almost entirely unreleased songs as well as a shortened version of their song "Athoth A Go!! Go!!" with a different bassline. The video also contained an early demo of their song "Just Because You Can", which would eventually be released on their 2024 album MG Ultra.

A visualiser for the album Guilted Hexitation by Prolaps (a project containing Matthew Stephenson of Machine Girl and Bonnie Baxter of Kill Alters) was posted to the Machine Girl channel on January 3, 2021, titled "PROLAPS 2021 GUILTED HEXITATION". The video was shot by Nicos Kennedy and edited by Lana Evoli. This was followed by a visualiser for their album Ultra Cycle Pt. 1: Vernal Birth, which premiered March 21, 2021, featuring visuals by Lucid Interval. A video for their album Ultra Cycle Pt. 2: Estival Growth followed on June 22, 2021, featuring visuals by N3T4.

On August 28, 2024, Machine Girl released an official music video for their single, "Until I Die", from the album, MG Ultra. The video was directed by Bryan M. Ferguson. Another official music video from the same album followed a week later, this one being for the song "Motherfather". Despite bearing similarity to AI generated art, this video was confirmed to not have any AI generated assets in it, as stated by its director, John Lee. On October 4, 2024, they released a music video for the song "Psychic Attack", the final track of the album MG Ultra. Two months later, on December 13, 2024, Machine Girl released another music video for "Ass2Mars", another MG Ultra song, which was directed by Sandy Loaf. A video for the track "Grindhouse", another track from MG Ultra, premiered on January 1, 2025. The video was directed, filmed and edited by Sydney Villacortabuer, and features scenes of a fight taking place at a supernatural party.
