= No One Will Save You =

2023 film by Brian Duffield

- Release poster
- Directed by: Brian Duffield
- Written by: Brian Duffield
- Produced by: Tim White; Trevor White; Allan Mandelbaum; Brian Duffield
- Starring: Kaitlyn Dever
- Cinematography: Aaron Morton
- Edited by: Gabriel Fleming
- Music by: Joseph Trapanese
- Production companies: 20th Century Studios; Star Thrower Entertainment
- Distributed by: Hulu
- Release date: September 19, 2023 (United States)
- Running time: 93 minutes
- Country: United States
- Budget: $22.8 million

No One Will Save You is a 2023 American science fiction horror film written, directed, and co-produced by Brian Duffield. It stars Kaitlyn Dever as a young woman living alone, shunned by the locals for a past incident, whose efforts to fight off an alien invasion have unexpected consequences. The film only has five words of dialogue spoken during its entire length.

No One Will Save You opened in theaters on September 19, 2023, and was released to streaming services by 20th Century Studios as a Hulu original film in the United States and on Disney+ Star internationally on September 22. It received generally positive reviews.

== Plot ==
Brynn is a seamstress who lives alone in her childhood home in a forest on the outskirts of a small town. Mourning the loss of both her best friend, Maude, and her mother, Sarah, Brynn copes by constructing a model town in her living room. She leads a solitary existence and is shunned by the local townspeople. One night, she awakens to discover that a humanoid alien has broken into her home. The alien uses telekinesis to subdue her, but she kills it in self-defense with the broken fragment of a model bell tower.

Finding that her car and all of her electrical devices have been rendered useless since the alien intrusion, Brynn cycles into town, where she uncovers evidence of alien attacks on her neighbors. The town appears unaffected as she makes her way to the local police station, where she unexpectedly encounters Maude's parents, who happen to be the chief of police and his wife. Maude's embittered mother spits in Brynn's face. Brynn flees the town on a bus, but several passengers attempt to restrain her and are revealed to be controlled by alien parasites placed in their throats. She escapes and discovers that many of the townspeople now appear to be under the parasites' control.

Brynn returns home and fortifies her house. That evening, a tractor beam from a flying saucer carries the alien's corpse out of her house, and she is forced to fend off two more alien intruders; she impales the smaller one with a broken mop handle and immolates the bigger one when its legs become entangled in her car and she ignites the gas tank. After she runs back into her house, another alien restrains her and places a parasite in her mouth, seemingly being forced to do so against its will. Brynn experiences an intense hallucination in which her life is back to normal and Maude is still alive. She apologizes to Maude before breaking free of the hallucination and pulling the parasite from her mouth, finding herself lying in a field. A flying saucer arrives and transforms the parasite into a doppelgänger of Brynn, which pursues the real Brynn into the woods.

The doppelgänger catches Brynn and stabs her, but Brynn kills it with a box cutter and escapes to a deserted road. She encounters a gigantic alien before being sucked into a flying saucer, where she is psychically probed by a group of aliens, revealing the event that turned the town against her: during an argument she had with Maude when both were children, Maude knocked Brynn to the ground and Brynn struck Maude with a rock, killing her. After seeing Brynn's memories, the aliens converse with one another and appear to agree on a course of action. They return Brynn to the deserted road, unharmed and free of their influence.

Brynn rebuilds her home and discovers that the other residents remain under the control of the parasites. They now treat her kindly and since she has finally overcome her trauma, she can live a normal life. In the sky, numerous flying saucers are seen stretching off into the horizon.

== Cast ==
- Kaitlyn Dever as Brynn
  - Elizabeth Kaluev as young Brynn
- Zack Duhame as the mailman
- Lauren Murray as Brynn's mother
- Geraldine Singer as Mrs. Collins
- Dane Rhodes as police chief Collins
- Daniel Rigamer as Mr. McCreary
- Dari Lynn Griffin as Maude

== Production ==
No One Will Save You was written as a spec script by Brian Duffield in 2019. In April 2021, it was reported that 20th Century Studios had acquired the script, with Duffield set to direct and Kaitlyn Dever attached to star.

On an estimated budget (before tax incentives) of $22.8 million, principal photography took place in New Orleans from April to June 2022. Visual effects were provided by British company DNEG. Joseph Trapanese composed the score.

== Release ==
No One Will Save You premiered in New York and Los Angeles theaters on September 19, 2023. It was subsequently released by 20th Century Studios as a Hulu original film in the United States on September 22. It premiered on Star+ in Latin America and Disney+ in other territories the same day.

== Reception ==
=== Viewership ===
Whip Media, which tracks viewership data for the more than 25 million worldwide users of its TV Time app, announced that No One Will Save You was the most-streamed film in the U.S. for the week ending September 24, and the third for the week of October 1, 2023. JustWatch, a guide to streaming content with access to data from more than 20 million users around the world, reported that No One Will Save You was the third most-streamed film in the U.S. during the week of September 18-24, 2023. According to JustWatch, It was also the top-streamed movie in Canada for two consecutive weeks, ending on October 8, 2023.

=== Critical response ===
On the review aggregator website Rotten Tomatoes, 81% of 116 critics' reviews are positive, with an average rating of 7.1/10. The website's consensus reads: "A home invasion thriller with an extraterrestrial twist, No One Will Save You serves up more genre fun from writer-director Brian Duffield – and proves Kaitlyn Dever doesn't need much dialogue to command the screen." Metacritic, which uses a weighted average, assigned the film a score of 60 out of 100, based on 16 critics, indicating "mixed or average" reviews.

=== Accolades ===
Year	Award	Category	Nominee(s)	Result	Ref.
2023	Phoenix Critics Circle	Best Horror Film	No One Will Save You	Nominated	
2024	Critics' Choice Awards	Best Actress in a Limited Series or Movie Made for Television	Kaitlyn Dever	Nominated	
2024	Critics' Choice Awards	Best Movie Made for Television	No One Will Save You	Nominated	
2024	Astra Film Awards	Best Horror Feature	No One Will Save You	Nominated	
2024	Portland Critics Association Awards	Best Horror Feature	No One Will Save You	Nominated	
2024	Writers Guild of America Awards	TV & New Media Motion Pictures	Brian Duffield	Nominated	
2024	Bram Stoker Awards	Best Screenplay	Brian Duffield	Nominated	
2024	Fangoria Chainsaw Awards	Best Streaming Premiere	No One Will Save You	Nominated	
2024	Fangoria Chainsaw Awards	Best Lead Performance	Kaitlyn Dever	Nominated	
2024	Astra TV Awards	Best TV Movie	No One Will Save You	Nominated	
2024	Astra TV Awards	Best Actress in a Limited Series or TV Movie	Kaitlyn Dever	Nominated	
2024	Astra TV Awards	Best Directing in a Limited Series or TV Movie	Brian Duffield	Nominated	

== Future ==
In September 2023, Duffield stated that he has no plans for a sequel but was open to developing one if No One Will Save You became a success. Shortly after that, he reiterated that he was open to creating sequels.
