= Sonic Dreams Collection =

2015 video game

- Splash screen, depicting screenshots of each minigame. Clockwise from top left: Make My Sonic, Sonic Movie Maker, Eggman Origin, My Roommate Sonic
- Developers: Arcane Kids; Cyborgdino
- Publisher: Arcane Kids
- Designers: Ben Esposito; Arjun Prakash
- Composer: Ben Esposito
- Series: Sonic the Hedgehog (unofficial)
- Engine: Unity
- Platforms: OS X, Windows
- Release: August 10, 2015
- Genres: Parody, art
- Mode: Single-player

Sonic Dreams Collection is a 2015 art game developed by Arcane Kids for OS X and Windows. It is an unofficial game based on Sega's Sonic the Hedgehog franchise that compiles four minigames presented as unfinished Sonic games, but the game as a whole later reveals itself to be a psychological horror game satirizing the then-modern Sonic fandom, known for its peculiarities. They include the character creator Make My Sonic, the massively multiplayer online role-playing game Eggman Origin, the adventure game Sonic Movie Maker, and the virtual reality (VR) game My Roommate Sonic. They are described in-game as having been developed by a nonexistent Sega studio for the Dreamcast in the late 1990s.

The game originated from concepts several individuals made during a Sonic-themed Valentine's Day event on the game-sharing website Glitch City. It was released as freeware on August 10, 2015, accompanied by a satirical press release claiming the contents were discovered in a Dreamcast software development kit Arcane Kids purchased on eBay in 2013. Sonic Dreams Collection quickly caught the attention of many video game journalists, who were intrigued by its absurd nature and content. They characterized the game as scary and bizarre, but considered it a work people should be interested in playing and noted its commentary on the series' fandom. Geek.com went on to name Sonic Dreams Collection the best game of 2015.

== Gameplay ==
In Sonic Dreams Collection, the player selects one of four single-player parody minigames based on the Sega game franchise Sonic the Hedgehog. Though unofficial, the minigames are presented as real, unfinished Sonic games for the Dreamcast developed by MJSTUDIO, a nonexistent Sega development studio, in the late 1990s. They are listed in the order they are said to have been developed in, with a fictional development history provided.

- Make My Sonic is a glitchy character creator in which the player alters the appearance of a Sonic the Hedgehog model. The player can change his coloration and alter the size and positioning of his limbs. After this, they select a randomly generated name. Screenshots of the player's character can be uploaded to Twitter. The game states Make My Sonic was MJSTUDIO's first Sonic game and was created in 1996. The studio apparently wanted it to be compatible with the defunct internet service SegaNet so users could import their character into supported games, believing Sonic would work in any genre.
- Eggman Origin is a vestigial massively multiplayer online role-playing game alleged to have been created in 1997. It is initially displayed as unplayable beyond the title screen, as it requests a connection to SegaNet. However, by opening a separate file in the game's directory folders (Seganet.exe) and using Make My Sonic to create an avatar and "upload it to SegaNet", the player will be able to access an untextured map populated by several bipedal, egg-shaped creatures and Doctor Eggman. By feeding Eggman with worms dug up from around him on the map, he grows. Once the player gives Eggman a certain number of worms, he is raised upon a pedestal to symbolize adulthood. If the player approaches Eggman on top of the pedestal, Eggman will eat the player character. After this, the player completes the game and ascends into the sky, with the number of ascensions posted on the online leaderboard chao.garden.
- Sonic Movie Maker is an adventure game in which the player is tasked with finding a camera and filming a six-second film to proceed to the following scene. The areas in which the player films are populated by ragdoll models of Sonic and other characters such as Tails, Shadow, Rouge, or Blaze, as well as objects such as pull cords, speech bubble sprites, and rings. Levels in Sonic Movie Maker include a garage, a prom dance floor and a hospital room, and feature increasingly voyeuristic and fetishized scenarios. The game states Sonic Movie Maker would have been a technological achievement but was canceled in 1998 when Sega management discovered its dark and sexual content. Similar to Make My Sonic, videos the player makes can be uploaded to Twitter. If the player completes My Roommate Sonic, they are given a bonus level where they can film the location of that game.
- My Roommate Sonic is a virtual reality (VR) game presented from a first-person view. The player sits on a couch next to Sonic, with Eggman encouraging the player by text message to pursue a romantic interest in him. If the player completes all the tasks Eggman assigns them, Sonic and the player prepare to kiss, only for Sonic's pupils to converge into a black hole that sucks the player character and their phone in. The player then watches their character running through a distorted Green Hill Zone and slowly morphing into a realistic, headless version of Sonic. The minigame is also compatible with the Oculus Rift VR headset. The game suggests My Roommate Sonic was canceled in 1999 because it was supposed to be used with the unreleased Sega VR headset.

== Development ==
Sonic Dreams Collection is a fan's game. We're not making fun of the fans necessarily, just celebrating the weirdness of it. Sonic fans kind of hated it for that. I hate any kind of brand that uses anti-corporate language to promote a corporation.

— Ben Esposito on how Sonic Dreams Collection was targeted at the Sonic fandom.

Sonic Dreams Collection was developed by Arcane Kids, an indie game developer known for releasing joke video games like Bubsy 3D: Bubsy Visits the James Turrell Retrospective (2013) and the unreleased Pokémon Millennial Edition (2014). According to designer Ben Esposito, the development team treated the game as a work of art. They conceived and designed it to celebrate and satirize the then-modern Sonic the Hedgehog fandom, known for its peculiarities. The title references the names of Sonic compilations such as Sonic Mega Collection (2002) and Sonic Gems Collection (2005).

The minigames in Sonic Dreams Collection were originally developed separately for the Los Angeles game-development group Glitch City's "Sonic is My Boyfriend" Valentine's Day event; Sonic Movie Maker, for example, was created by former Electronic Arts employee Arjun Prakash, who was also a co-founder for Glitch City. Prakash developed the game in response to a childhood friend joining the porn industry and his feelings towards that. Originally, Sonic Movie Maker was just an orgy game where four players controlled Sonic characters to hump each other on a heart-shaped bed. Afterward, Prakash and two Arcane Kids members decided to merge the "Sonic is My Boyfriend" games they made to form Sonic Dreams Collection. Soon after, Prakash prototyped a camcorder system, and started to work full-time on the game along with another Arcane Kids member, Jacob Knipfing. Development lasted for another three months, progressing through weekly sessions on Glitch City with the help of other contributors. Despite his significant contributions, Prakash did not receive much credit for his involvement. Arcane Kids later issued an apology.

Sonic Dreams Collection was released on August 10, 2015 as freeware for OS X and Windows computers on the website hedgehog.exposed. The site contained a press release in which Arcane Kids claimed to have discovered the game's contents in a Dreamcast software development kit they purchased on eBay in 2013 and posted them online as a protest against Sega's apparent attempts to keep their existence a secret. The press release does disclaim that Sonic Dreams Collection is a parodical work, discounting any affiliation with Sega. To download the game, visitors have to type in the password "grandpa".

== Reception ==
Sonic Dreams Collection quickly caught the attention of video game journalists for its absurd content and intention to lampoon the series' fandom. A day after release, VG247 called it a "piece of gaming history." Kill Screen declared it 2015's 13th best game and Geek.com named it the year's top game. Kill Screen wrote that although inappropriate, Sonic Dreams Collection provided a thoughtful homage to the series' fandom; Geek.com found it took what was good about Bubsy 3D: Bubsy Visits the James Turrell Retrospective and "expands on it in glorious ways." Esposito has said some Sonic fans were offended by the game because they felt it was ridiculing them.

Summarizations of the game ranged from a "horror show" (VG247) to "surprisingly polished" (Destructoid). The Daily Dot questioned why the game even existed and wrote it took the Sonic fandom's weirdness to a new level, and Polygon's authors expressed concern they were not allowed to write about its contents. Upon learning about it, Eurogamer's writer said he thought it was "an innocent enough NeoGAF post" that turned into "something much more sinister." Eurogamer and Kotaku were lost for words in describing Sonic Dreams Collection's content, with Kotaku describing the whole experience as haunting. VG247 did not describe the game in detail, believing readers needed to play it themselves to understand. They also disagreed with The Daily Dot's comment about the peculiarities of the fandom, saying Sonic Dreams Collection "isn't even scraping the surface of the places those people go." In addition to mocking the fandom, Engadget found the game served as a comment of the state of the Sonic franchise and its sullied reputation.

Journalists characterized Sonic Dreams Collection's minigames as unsettling and bizarre; Destructoid wrote they ranged from "creepy sexual fan service and Sonic community parody to something truly nightmare-inducing." Of its games, writers were most intrigued by Sonic Movie Maker. PC Gamer called it the highlight of the game, while Kotaku, Polygon, and Destructoid were left in shock from playing it. Polygon—which produced walkthroughs of all four minigames—described Make My Sonic as random, Eggman Origin as scary, Sonic Movie Maker as horrifying, and My Roommate Sonic as "tak[ing] things to the next level". Engadget wrote players would finish Sonic Dreams Collection within minutes but that they would likely come back, finding it "uncanny at recreating both the vibe of crude fan art and Sega's turn-of-the-century zeitgeist, that sense that the Dreamcast would usher in a brave new era for the blue hedgehog and his friends."

== See also ==
- List of unofficial Sonic media
