= No One Will Save You (soundtrack) =

No One Will Save You (Original Soundtrack)

Film score by Joseph Trapanese
- Released: September 22, 2023
- Recorded: 2022–2023
- Genre: Film score
- Length: 67:38
- Label: Hollywood
- Producer: Joseph Trapanese

Joseph Trapanese chronology
The Machine (2023)	No One Will Save You (2023)	Scott Pilgrim Takes Off (2023)

No One Will Save You (Original Soundtrack) is the soundtrack to the 2023 film of the same name directed by Brian Duffield. Featuring original score composed by Joseph Trapanese, the album consisted of 30-tracks of the score released by Hollywood Records on September 22, 2023, which would be followed by a vinyl edition was released on January 12, 2024 through Waxwork Records.

== Development ==
Duffield who collaborated with his Trapanese on his directorial debut Spontaneous (2020), eventually became friends during the film's premiere. During that time, they discussed about a potential script that had less dialogues and sent the script to Trapanese who thought it to be "fun" and "ideal" for a scope for music. Trapanese had written the score even before the film began production. When they recorded and rewrote several themes, he sent an hour-long playlist that became invaluable to the cast and crew, as it made everyone realize the tone of the film.

Trapanese used synthesized electronic material for Brynn (Dever)'s music than for the aliens, avoiding anything too sci-fi in his score, as her character herself was a lonesome alien in her town. He suggested the music to feel organic and strange, thereby using pre-recorded instruments, he further de-tuned and reversed them, deviating the sound of a traditional orchestra. Experimenting with the music, he played two oboes on a very high note, and bent down the sounds of trombones and French horns to signal Brynn is in danger. For the opening theme, he used string glissandos and reversed them thereby evolving to give a string cloud, and juxtaposed them with trombones and French horns, to give the feeling of dread and horror. For the melodic themes for aliens, he played the strings in reverse back-and-forth to give "unnatural" sounds.

== Release ==
The soundtrack was released by Hollywood Records on September 22, 2023, coincided with the film's streaming release on Hulu. The same month, Waxwork Records announced a vinyl edition of the soundtrack, with the album appears in a 180-gram double disc LP colored with "midnight blue and white light beam" and is packaged in a heavyweight gatefold jacket with matte satin coating with a 12-inch insert. The vinyl edition was made available for pre-order on September 29 priced at $28 and was released on January 12, 2024.

== Track listing ==
No.	Title	Length
1.	"No One Will Save You"	0:49
2.	"A Routine"	1:35
3.	"Into Town"	1:44
4.	"Hiding from Past"	1:16
5.	"Letter to Maude"	1:22
6.	"First Encounter"	5:14
7.	"No Dial Tone"	1:41
8.	"Cleaning Up"	1:08
9.	"Bike Into Town"	3:04
10.	"Overwhelmed"	2:03
11.	"Incognito"	1:37
12.	"On the Bus"	2:39
13.	"Seeing an Old Friend"	1:17
14.	"Storm Chaser"	1:53
15.	"Welcome Home"	2:47
16.	"Preparation"	1:36
17.	"They're Back"	2:40
18.	"In the Basement"	3:08
19.	"LF Wants to Be BFF"	3:25
20.	"Daddy Long Legs"	5:25
21.	"Brynny Bird"	1:16
22.	"Red Room"	1:46
23.	"I'm Sorry"	2:47
24.	"Invaded"	2:13
25.	"New Friend"	2:44
26.	"Examination"	1:37
27.	"What Happened"	3:05
28.	"The Decision"	3:27
29.	"Light Show"	1:31
30.	"New Neighbors"	0:49
Total length:		67:38

== Reception ==
Ian Sandwell of Digital Spy called the music and sound design as "expertly crafted". Benjamin Lee of The Guardian stated with the music and production value "it's got the feel of a real movie, the highest compliment one can give right now to a film designed for streaming."

Touissant Egan of Polygon summarised "The score by Joseph Trapanese is especially worthy of praise, with shrill, stabbing violins and brooding synths that punctuate a soundscape of gasping breaths and indecipherable guttural roars and chittering". he further wrote that Trapanese carries the "majority of the dramatic and emotional weight of No One WIll Save You through their combined efforts." Despite praising the score, Dais Johnston of Inverse felt that it "becomes a liability more than an asset pretty quickly."

== Release history ==
Release dates and formats for No One Will Save You (Original Soundtrack)
Region	Date	Format(s)	Label	Ref.
Various	September 22, 2023	Digital download; streaming	Hollywood	
Various	January 12, 2024	Vinyl	Waxwork	
