= Perfect Stride =

2013 video game

- Developer: Arcane Kids
- Publisher: LA Game Space (alpha)
- Designers: Ben Esposito, Russell Honor
- Engine: Unity
- Platforms: Windows, Macintosh
- Release: 2013 (alpha)
- Genre: Sports
- Modes: Single-player, multiplayer

Perfect Stride is an indie skateboarding video game developed by Arcane Kids. It was released for early access in an alpha form in 2013, but was abandoned before it was ever completed.

== Gameplay ==
Perfect Stride is a first-person skateboarding simulator that players can do tricks in and socialize with other players online. It is set in an alternate universe in which pro skater Tony Hawk had never landed the 900 at X Games V in 1999 and achieved widespread recognition, and thus had never "triggered an explosion of corporate skateboarding", leading to the rise to power of an immortal "time wizard" who uses his abilities to prevent anybody from dying. The player's overarching goal is to venture through the various islands within the game's dystopian environment and find what is rumored to be the very last bullet to exist on Earth and use it to kill the Time Wizard once and for all.

The game takes place within a metaphorical depiction of Yahoo! GeoCities and serves as a symbol of the "dying web," noting that the various pieces of architecture are representative of personal web pages. Perfect Stride takes inspiration from early movement exploits in first-person shooting games. Making use of only the computer mouse, it utilizes a unique control scheme in which the player clicks the left and right buttons to build up force and moves the mouse in that direction to gain momentum. A "rewind" feature allowing players to correct mistakes is also present in the game, included out of the developers' experiences with other games and a desire to make the gameplay fair. The rewind gimmick is also tied into the game's plot; the player is unable to die at any point at all in the game, as time is frozen whenever they are about to and they are forced to rewind out of it.

== Development ==
Perfect Stride was announced by developer Arcane Kids in 2013. The concept for Perfect Stride was inspired by developer and co-creator Ben Esposito's early attempts to modify Half-Life 2, in which he mistakenly produced an unorthodox style of control that he felt would be interesting as a game of its own. Esposito brought the idea to co-developer Russell Honor, who took a full month in order to faithfully recreate the style of movement that Esposito had described. The game is meant to simulate the social atmosphere of a real-life skate park, taking heed from early mods and online chat rooms, and is intended to provide a laid-back multiplayer experience, with the team referring to it as a "lifestyle game".

An early access alpha version of Perfect Stride was first made available to backers of the Kickstarter campaign for LA Game Space in August 2013. The build was a finalist for the "Excellence in Visual Arts" category in the 2014 Independent Games Festival, and was released for free via the Internet Archive when LA Game Space ceased operation in 2018.

Due to its ambitious nature, the game is still in development and planned for an eventual release via Steam, with intentions to include a level editor and a full-fledged multiplayer feature separate from the story mode. Though as of 2022 it is unlikely the game will ever be released as Arcane Kids has mostly split up, with the about section of the game stating on Ben Esposito's website "The perfect game. Can you find a copy?".
