= Anyway (Anamanaguchi album) =

Studio album by Anamanaguchi
- Released: August 8, 2025
- Genre: Indie rock
- Length: 45:03
- Label: Polyvinyl
- Producer: Dave Fridmann

Anamanaguchi chronology
[USA] (2019)	Anyway (2025)

Singles from Anyway
- 1. "Darcie" Released: May 6, 2025; 2. "Magnet" Released: June 26, 2025; 3. "Rage (Kitchen Sink)" Released: July 23, 2025; 4. "Buckwild" Released: August 6, 2025

Anyway is the fourth studio album by American rock band Anamanaguchi. It partially moves away from the band's earlier chiptune-based style, incorporating more elements of indie rock. It was released on August 8, 2025 through Polyvinyl.

== Composition and recording ==
Unlike previous Anamanaguchi albums, which were created by sharing work-in-progress tracks digitally, Anyway was devised in person at the American Football House. It deviates somewhat from the band's previous chiptune sound, instead being closer to indie rock, though it still incorporates some elements of the former. The album was produced and mixed by Dave Fridmann.

After "Magnet"'s composition, the band post-facto defined it as "Batman rock", stating they felt that its status as a "love song with some extreme feelings" meant it included a "key part of the formula" for the movies' music. The distortion effects in "Rage (Kitchen Sink)" were influenced by Crass, who drummer Luke Silas described as utilising them to represent "horrors of war and overall fear".

== Release and promotion ==
In May 2025, the album was announced alongside the first single, "Darcie". The second single, "Magnet", was released with a Batman-themed music video, and accompanied by a graphic defining different kinds of Batman music. The third and fourth singles, "Rage (Kitchen Sink)", and "Buckwild", were released in July and August; the band described the music video for the latter as being intentionally rudimentary given the effort that was devoted towards "Magnet".

The full album was released on August 8, 2025 by Polyvinyl.

== Reception ==
Professional ratings
Review scores
Source	Rating
AllMusic	3.5/5 stars
Pitchfork	7.5/10

Paul Simpson of AllMusic described the album as "more of a re-emphasis of their rock roots than a total transformation" and "the most traditionally written and recorded work Anamanaguchi have made as a band," calling it "easily their most lyrical and guitar-driven effort." Pitchfork referred to the "identity adopted for the album" as "guitar-toting indie-rock lifers happy to pack out your city's 200-capacity venue on any given Saturday night." Madison Skelton of MXDWN was critical of the album, describing it as "more cluttered than cohesive", with a sound that "rarely evolves".

== Track listing ==
All tracks are written by Peter Berkman, James DeVito, Luke Silas, and Ary Warnaar.

Anyway track listing
No.	Title	Length
1.	"Sparkler"	3:08
2.	"Rage (Kitchen Sink)"	4:06
3.	"Magnet"	3:33
4.	"Lieday"	3:06
5.	"Come for Us"	1:49
6.	"Buckwild"	3:58
7.	"Sapphire"	2:45
8.	"Valley of Silence"	5:22
9.	"Fall Away"	4:44
10.	"Darcie"	3:01
11.	"Really Like To"	3:01
12.	"Nightlife"	4:48

== Personnel ==
Credits adapted from Tidal.

=== Anamanaguchi ===
- Peter Berkman – guitar, vocals, co-production
- James DeVito – bass, vocals, co-production
- Luke Silas – drums, vocals, co-production
- Ary Warnaar – guitar, vocals, co-production

=== Additional contributors ===
- Dave Fridmann – production, mixing, engineering
- Chris Gehringer – mastering
- Casey Di Iorio – vocal engineering
- Geoffrey Mutchnick – editing
- Michael Fridmann – engineering assistance
- Simon Whybray – art direction
- Anna Longworth – photography
- Brad Warnaar – French horn on "Fall Away"
