= Arcane Kids =

American video game studio

- Industry: Video games
- Fate: Unknown
- Headquarters: Los Angeles, CA, USA
- Key people: Ben Esposito Russell Honor; Tom Astle; Jacob Knipfing; Yuliy Vigdorchik; Sylvia Forrest; Tom Lanciani; Evan Gonzalez; Arjun Prakash Dan Spaulding
- Number of employees: 5 (2015)
- Website: https://arcanekids.com/

Arcane Kids is an independent video game studio based in Los Angeles, California. They are a collective of developers, largely known for creating surreal and humorous video games using the Unity engine. As of 2015, the group consisted of 5 members, including Ben Esposito, Russell Honor, Tom Astle, Jacob Knipfing, and Yuliy Vigdorchik. The name "Arcane Kids" was derived from a mysterious re-writable compact disc with the phrase inscribed on top of it, which was found lying in a patch of dirt.

The team first met in college at Ground Zero, an on-campus DIY music club at the Rensselaer Polytechnic Institute, where they decided to start developing video games for fun, forming a homemade arcade at the club where they, alongside other student developers, could showcase game projects. After creating and featuring several small games at the Arcane Kids Arcade, the group of students developed Zineth, an open-ended skating game, as a student project in experimental video game design. Zineth was released in 2012 for Windows and Macintosh PCs, and went on to win the award for Best Student Project in the Independent Games Festival at the Game Developers Conference. The following year, Arcane Kids revealed Perfect Stride, a skating game that was never officially released though did have an alpha, which depicts what would have happened if Tony Hawk had never performed the 900 skating move. In 2013, Arcane Kids released Bubsy 3D: Bubsy Visits the James Turrell Retrospective, an ironic tribute to Bubsy 3D. In 2015 Arcane Kids released Sonic Dreams Collection, an unofficial game based on Sega's Sonic the Hedgehog, and CRAP! No One Loves Me, a racing game that was commissioned by Fantastic Arcade.

Arcane Kids has not released any games since 2016, and its members have since joined other studios, developed their own self-published indie projects, or left game development altogether. There has been no official announcement as to the studio's status.

== History ==
=== Creation, Arcane Kids Arcade and Zineth (2010–2012) ===
Arcane Kids was first founded at the Rensselaer Polytechnic Institute by Ben Esposito, Russell Honor, and Yuliy Vigdorchcik, who met at Ground Zero, an on-campus DIY music venue. After meeting each other, the group decided to uptake the development of video games, taking inspiration from D.I.Y. group Babycastles. In 2010, the team formed the Arcane Kids Arcade, a homemade arcade at Ground Zero that was intended as a space for developers to showcase their games. According to the team in an online chat interview for Sex Magazine, the title "Arcane Kids" was an ominous phrase written on a rewritable compact disc that they had found lying on the ground. The team began developing their own games for the arcade, in addition to featuring games from other developers on the campus, opting to try and develop a new game directly before each event at the venue, according to Honor. Among these was Nudo, a platform-puzzle title described as "a platformer on top of a rubik's cube" which was one of the first Arcane Kids games according to the team. Esposito created the game in the summer of 2010 while visiting Madrid, with his colleague, Manuel Pardo, programming the game in Game Maker and assisting with level design.

In 2012, Arcane Kids developed Zineth as a student thesis in experimental game design. The game is a cel-shaded 3D skate game, set in a futuristic world in which the entire world has been absorbed within a mobile game, brainwashing all of its inhabitants. The title is a pun on the words "zine" (a slang term referring to a magazine) and "zenith"; the player, controlling a magazine deliverer, flies throughout the desertlike setting and delivers magazines to people in order to show them what the real world is like. An in-game cell phone is constantly present on-screen, having stemmed from the concept of a character who could "skate around in a big desert, [sic] while trying to play a cellphone game." This cell phone is used to receive missions, as well as containing Twitter integration which can be used to tweet screenshots taken in-game, and a minigame titled Mirage Cat which was originally developed separately with the intent of being its own arcade game. The phone mechanic also takes inspiration from online Flash-based titles and role-playing games such as Pokémon, with several upgrades that can be purchased using earned currency. Jacob Kipfing, a developer who helped work on the game, cited many of the Dreamcast games from the early 2000s as large influencers, highlighting games such as Jet Set Radio and Rez as prime examples. Zineth was released in August 2012 for Microsoft Windows and Macintosh PCs, with 7 people credited as having worked on the game (including fellow students who were part of the same class at the time). By March 2013, it had been played more than 140,000 times. Comparisons were drawn between the game and Jet Set Radio, a game with similar graphics and gameplay mechanics; despite this, the game's developers have stated that none of the team members working on the game had owned a Dreamcast or played Jet Set Radio, although Honor lamented that his knowledge of the game based on magazine coverage had undeniably had an impact on him. It was eventually nominated in the Independent Games Festival at the 2013 Game Developers Conference, where it won the award for Best Student Project.

=== Perfect Stride and Bubsy 3D: Bubsy Visits the James Turrell Retrospective (2013–2015) ===
In 2013, Arcane Kids released Room of 1000 Snakes, a joke game developed by Esposito and Vigdorchik. Lasting as little as 2 minutes long, the game follows an explorer who ventures within an ancient Egyptian tomb in order to "solve the mystery of the snakes" despite warning messages indicating the imminent dangers of the tomb. The explorer encounters a button and presses it, only to be assaulted by a barrage of snakes.

In the same year, Arcane Kids announced their next project, titled Perfect Stride. The game, an online, first-person skateboarding simulator where players can do skateboarding tricks and socialize, depicts what would have happened in an alternate universe in which pro skater Tony Hawk had never landed the 900 at the X Games and achieved widespread recognition. According to a developer using the moniker "lil_vertex", the setting is that of an apocalyptic universe where the stunt hadn't "triggered an explosion of corporate skateboarding." They also claimed that it takes place within a metaphorical depiction of Yahoo! GeoCities and served as a symbol of the "dying web," noting that the various pieces of architecture are representative of personal web pages. Esposito and Honor further explained that in the wake of this, an immortal "time wizard" comes into power who uses his abilities to prevent anybody from dying. In the midst of this, the player's overarching goal is to venture through the various islands within the game's dystopian environment and find what is rumored to be the very last bullet to exist on Earth so it can be used to kill the Time Wizard once and for all. Gameplay-wise, Perfect Stride takes inspiration from early movement exploits in first-person shooting games. Making use of only the computer mouse, it utilizes a unique control scheme in which the player clicks the left and right buttons to build up force and moves the mouse in that direction to gain momentum. Esposito found specific inspiration for this style of gameplay several years prior to the game's development while attempting to mod Half-Life 2, where he mistakenly produced an unorthodox style of control that he felt would be interesting in a game of its own. Esposito brought the idea to co-developer Honor, who took a full month in order to faithfully recreate the style of movement that Esposito had described. A "rewind" feature allowing players to correct mistakes is also present in the game. This feature was included out of the developers' experiences with other games, and was considered necessary in order to make it fairly challenging. The rewind gimmick is also tied into the game's plot; the player is unable to die at any point at all, as time freezes whenever they are about to and they are forced to rewind out of it. The game is meant to simulate the social atmosphere of a real-life skate park, taking heed from early mods and online chat rooms, and is intended to provide a laid-back multiplayer experience, with the team referring to it as a "lifestyle game". An early access alpha version of the game was made available to backers of the Kickstarter campaign for L.A. Game Space in August 2013. Due to its ambitious nature, the game was said to still in development and planned for an eventual release via Steam, with intentions to include a level editor and a full-fledged multiplayer feature separate from the story mode but was never released.

In September 2013, Arcane Kids released Bubsy 3D: Bubsy Visits the James Turrell Retrospective, a 3D platform game and an unofficial entry in the Bubsy series of games. Touted as an edutainment experience centered around modern art, it follows Bubsy the Bobcat as he endures a surreal spiritual experience while visiting the tribute exhibit for light artist James Turrell in Los Angeles. It is a facetious homage to Bubsy 3D, a 3D platform game in the series released for the PlayStation in 1996 which gained infamy for its negative reception, and attempts to inform the player about the modern art frontier using gameplay which mimics that of its inspirative predecessor; Bubsy's controls are made to be similar to the original game's, and stages contain copious collectibles which exert little to no effect on the player's performance. It was released to celebrate the 18th anniversary of Bubsy 3D, and received considerable attention on the Internet for its strange content.

=== Sonic Dreams Collection, CRAP! No One Loves Me (2015–2017) ===
In August 2015 Arcane Kids released Sonic Dreams Collection, an unofficial game based on Sega's Sonic the Hedgehog that compiles four minigames presented as unfinished Sonic games, but later reveals itself to be a psychological horror game satirizing the contemporary Sonic fandom.

One month later, in September 2015, Arcane Kids released CRAP! No One Loves Me, a racing game that was commissioned by Fantastic Arcade. In the game, players ride in coffins and race through stages set in the afterlife.

In 2016, Ben Esposito released the horror game Tattletail, under a different publishing name, which generated significant mainstream appeal.

== Games ==
- Nudo (2010)
- Sk8punk (Unknown (2010-2012))
- Mirage cat (Unknown (2010-2012))
- Room of 1000 snakes (2012)
- Zineth (2012)
- Bubsy 3D: Bubsy Visits the James Turrell Retrospective (2013)
- Perfect Stride (An alpha version of the game was released in 2013, however, the full game was never released.)
- Sonic Dreams Collection (2015)
- CRAP! No One Loves Me (2015)
