= Ben Esposito =

American video game designer (born 1989)

- Born: February 25, 1989 (age 37)
- Occupations: Video game designer; director; programmer; producer; composer
- Years active: 2012 - Present
- Notable work: Arcane Kids; Donut County; Tattletail; Neon White
- Spouse: Geneva Hodgson

Ben Esposito (born February 25, 1989) is an American video game designer based in Los Angeles, California. He is most known for his work at the indie studio Arcane Kids, and titles such as Donut County and Neon White.

== Career ==
Ben Esposito would be a founding member of Arcane Kids alongside Russell Honor and Yuliy Vigdorchcik at Rensselaer Polytechnic Institute in 2010. They would run Arcane Kids Arcade, a homemade arcade for students to showcase work out of a music venue on the campus. They would gain attention from mainstream news outlets over releases such as Sonic Dreams Collection and Bubsy 3D: Bubsy Visits the James Turrell Retrospective.

Esposito would be hired at development studio Giant Sparrow and act as a level designer for The Unfinished Swan. During his free time, Esposito would start development on a game that he created a demo for under the name Kachina. It would later release under the name Donut County in 2018. The game would receive good critical reception.

== Ludography ==
Year	Title	Role	Note	Ref(s)
2010	Nudo	Designer, Artist, Sound Designer, Composer	With Manuel Pardo	
2012	The Unfinished Swan	Level Designer	With Giant Sparrow	
2012	Room of 1000 Snakes	Level Designer, Artist, Programmer	With Arcane Kids	
2012	Brooklyn Trash King	Writer	With Sarah C. Johnson	
2013	Bubsy 3D: Bubsy Visits the James Turrell Retrospective	Level Designer, Artist, Sound Designer, Composer, Writer	With Arcane Kids	
2013	Perfect Stride	Level Designer, Artist, Sound Designer	Cancelled; With Arcane Kids	
2014	Pale Machine	Level Designer, Artist, Sound Designer	With Arcane Kids	
2014	Land of the Snooze King	Sole creator	Role-playing board game	
2015	Sonic Dreams Collection	Designer	With Arcane Kids	
2016	Tattletail	Director, Designer, Artist, Composer	As Little Flag Software	
2016	Capsule Silence XXIV	Designer, Programmer, Artist, Sound Design	With Anamanaguchi	
2017	What Remains of Edith Finch	Design Consultant	With Giant Sparrow	
2018	Donut County	Sole Developer, Composer	Published by Annapurna Interactive, composed alongside Dan Koestner	
2021	Solar Ash	Special thanks, Playtester	By Heart Machine	
2022	Neon White	Director, Designer, Programmer, Sound Designer	Published by Annapurna Interactive	
2026	Bubsy 4D	Special thanks as part of Arcane Kids	By Fabraz	
