= Bit Pilot =

2010 video game

- App icon
- Developer: Zach Gage
- Publisher: Zach Gage
- Composer: Sabrepulse
- Platform: iOS
- Release: March 4, 2010
- Genre: Bullet hell
- Mode: Single-player

Bit Pilot is a 2010 bullet hell video game created by Zach Gage. The player controls a spaceship and must continuously dodge incoming asteroids and lasers for as long as possible. Released on March 4, 2010, for iOS devices, it was praised for its graphics and soundtrack but faced mixed reception for its gameplay and controls.

== Gameplay ==
The player must maneuver a ship to dodge incoming asteroids and lasers.

Bit Pilot is a bullet hell game. In it, the player controls a spaceship and must avoid incoming lasers and asteroids. The player can control the speed and direction of the spaceship by swiping on the screen with two thumb controls. As it progresses, the asteroids increase in size. When the player comes in contact with an obstacle, the spaceship loses one shield; hitting an asteroid without any shields or touching a laser triggers a game over. Pill-shaped power-ups occasionally spawn and give the player bonus points or an additional shield. Gaining enough points unlocks new gameplay modes, music, and themes.

There are two modes: Super Massive and Tunnels. In Super Massive mode, asteroids are smaller and faster, but power-ups spawn more frequently and increase the player's size when collected. In Tunnels mode, the player must evade larger asteroids. Additionally, the two difficulty modes—Easy and Normal—change the number of asteroids.

== Development and release ==
Bit Pilot was developed by Zach Gage, a New York City-based indie developer. Bit Pilot's soundtrack was composed by Sabrepulse, and its leaderboards were run by OpenFeint. It was released for iOS on March 4, 2010, and in June 2011, Game Center support and two gameplay modes—Super Massive and Tunnels—were added. Bit Pilot was showcased at the Austin Film Festival in September 2011 and the Hayden Planetarium in January 2012.

== Reception ==
Reception

Aggregate score
Aggregator	Score
Metacritic	78/100

Review scores
Publication	Score
The A.V. Club	A
Edge	8/10
Pocket Gamer	3.5/5
148Apps	4/5
AppSpy	3/5
Slide to Play	3/4

On the review aggregation website Metacritic, Bit Pilot has a "generally favorable" score of 78 based on nine critics.

Bit Pilot's gameplay was divided among critics. Reviewers praised it as exciting and likened it to retro video games, specifically Asteroids. However, 148Apps and Edge felt that the gameplay, rather than its rewards for gaining points, gave it replay value, and Tracy Erickson of Pocket Gamer and Kyle Vanhemert of Wired magazine commented on its lack of variety.

The controls garnered a mixed reception. Although AppSpy, 148Apps, and Edge magazine thought the swiping mechanic was unique and precise, 148Apps and AppSpy criticized how the controls were complicated to learn. Chris Reed of Slide to Play stated that he preferred for Bit Pilot to have a single movement stick, while Andrew Hayward of GamesRadar+ described them as "the most responsive controls we've experienced to date".

Critics praised Bit Pilot's graphics and soundtrack; some felt that they complemented its retro theme, while a reviewer from The A.V. Club stated the graphics "[belied] the atrocious challenge at hand". Reed praised unlocking soundtracks as a reward, writing that they were "far more pleasing" than a leaderboard ranking.
