= USA (Anamanaguchi album) =

[USA]

Studio album by Anamanaguchi
- Released: October 25, 2019
- Genre: Chiptune; synth-pop; electropop; bitpop; pop
- Length: 52:28
- Label: Polyvinyl
- Producer: Ary Warnaar, Peter Berkman, Luke Silas, Nathan Ritholz, Porter Robinson

Anamanaguchi chronology
Capsule Silence XXIV (Original Soundtrack Vol II) (2017)	[USA] (2019)	Anyway (2025)

Singles from [USA]
- 1. "Lorem Ipsum (Arctic Anthem)" Released: August 29, 2019; 2. "Air On Line" Released: October 2, 2019; 3. "On My Own" Released: October 23, 2019

[USA] is the third studio album from American chiptune-based pop and rock band Anamanaguchi. It was released on October 25, 2019 through Polyvinyl. It received largely positive critical reception.

== Background ==
After the release of their previous album Endless Fantasy, criticism about perceived cultural appropriation and a "point of reckoning" about the negative aspects of what the band described as literal "endless fantasy" lead Anamanaguchi to move in a less escapist direction. The band initially even considered moving away from the Anamanaguchi name, but decided that it would be more "authentic" to retain their previous identity.

The initial version of the album completed under the [USA] title was slated for release in 2015, but the band felt that it didn't "answer the question that the title poses". Instead, the tracks were released as a soundtrack to a semi-fictional video game, Capsule Silence XXIV, created in collaboration with indie developer Ben Esposito, who later created Donut County.

== Composition ==
Thematically, the band conceptualised the album as more thematically "complete" compared to the "sugar all the time" of their previous work, with member Ary Warnaar stating that they incorporated themes of "happiness, loneliness, loss [and] connection".

Compared to Anamanaguchi's previous chiptune music, The Fader described [USA] as incorporating more aspects of pop music and post-rock. Co-frontman Peter Berkman described it as a version of "an Anamanaguchi album... not devoted to video games", with chiptune instrumentation incorporated in limited but "more intentional" ways.

For "Air On Line", the band collaborated with Porter Robinson. "Sunset By Plane" was initially written as a song for Luke Silas's then-partner, and later featured in Capsule Silence XXIV before being revised with vocals by Caroline Lufkin.

== Critical reception ==
Professional ratings
Review scores
Source	Rating
AllMusic	3.5/5 stars
Pitchfork	7.5/10
Spectrum Culture	3.5/5 stars

Pitchfork praised [USA] as Anamanaguchi's "most emotionally grounded record yet". AllMusic reviewer Paul Simpson described it as a "a more challenging listen" than their previous work, but stated that it was "filled with triumphant, transcendent moments". Holly Hazelwood of Spectrum Culture said that it didn't "reinvent the wheel", but the band "spend a lot of time looking for new ways to use that wheel".

== Track listing ==
No.	Title	Length
1.	"[ U S A ]"	3:18
2.	"Lorem Ipsum (Arctic Anthem)"	4:50
3.	"The C R T Woods"	4:17
4.	"Speak to You [Memory Messengers]"	1:41
5.	"Sunset by Plane" (featuring Caroline Lufkin)	4:42
6.	"Air On Line"	4:59
7.	"Apophenia Light [Name Eaters]"	1:46
8.	"Overwriting Incorporate"	5:24
9.	"B S X" (featuring Hatsune Miku)	2:52
10.	"On My Own" (featuring HANA)	3:58
11.	"Up to You" (featuring meesh)	2:30
12.	"Tear"	3:24
13.	"We Die"	6:12
14.	"[ L O M ]"	2:38

Notes

- All tracks are co-produced by Ary Warnaar and Peter Berkman and co-written by Warnaar, Berkman, James DeVito and Luke Silas.
- Tracks 2, 5, 8, 9, and 13 were co-produced by Luke Silas.
- Tracks 2, 3, 5, 6, 8–11, and 13 were co-produced by Nathan Ritholz.
- "Sunset by Plane" is co-written by Caroline Lufkin.
- "Air On Line" is co-written by and features contributions from Porter Robinson.
- "On My Own" is co-written by Hana Pestle.

== Charts ==
Chart (2019)	Peak position
US Heatseekers Albums (Billboard)	3
US Independent Albums (Billboard)	7
US Vinyl Albums (Billboard)	17
US Top Album Sales (Billboard)	63
