= Carpainter =

Japanese musician

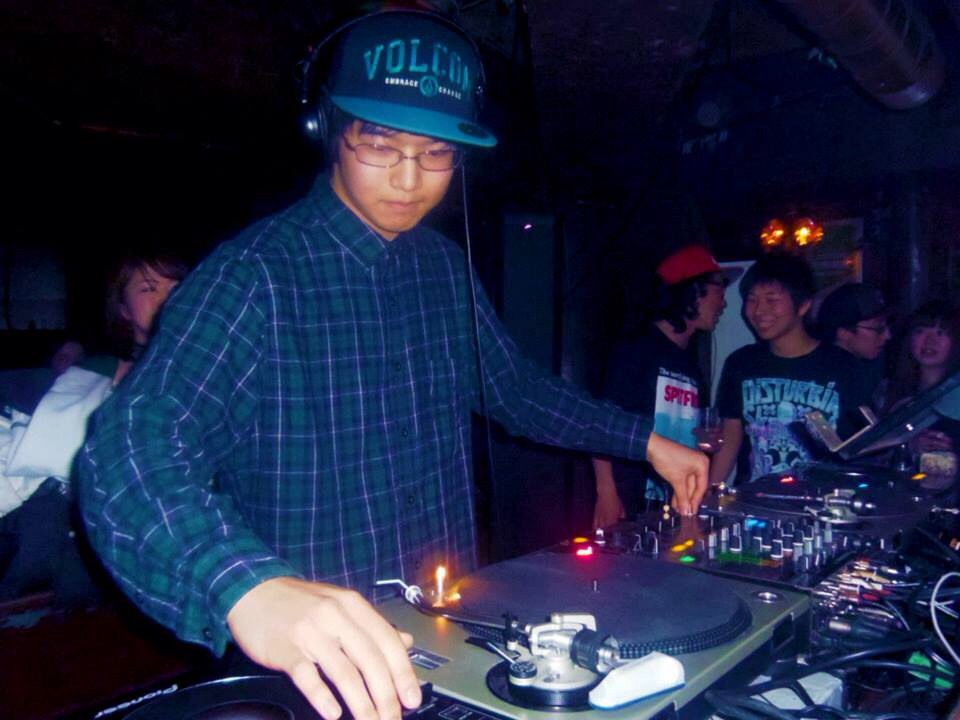

Background information
- Birth name: Taimei Kawai
- Born: Kawasaki, Kanagawa, Japan
- Genres: Techno, house, future garage
- Occupation(s): Producer, DJ
- Years active: 2012–present
- Labels: Trekkie Trax, Top Billin, Heka Trax
- Website: www.trekkie-trax.com/artist/carpainter/

Taimei Kawai, better known by his stage name Carpainter, is a Japanese electronic musician. He started composing future garage in 2012 and released his debut EP on his label Trekkie Trax, which he launched with his brother Seimei and other DJs. He has gone on to release the albums Out of Resistance (2015) and Returning (2017)

He was born in Kawasaki, Kanagawa, Japan and lived in the Netherlands.

== Discography ==
=== Albums ===
- Out of Resistance (Trekkie Trax, 2015)
- Returning (Trekkie Trax, 2017)

=== Singles and EPs ===
- "Carpainter (2012)
- "Double Rainbow" (2013)
- "Gravity Fails" (2013)
- "War Dub from the New World" (2013)
- "Jubilate" (2014)
- "Saltflake Snow" (2014)
- "Digital Harakiri" (2015)
- "Amazing!!!" (with Maxo) (2015)
- "BrokY" (2015)
- "Noble Arts" (2016)
- "Browser Crasher" (2016)
- "Geofront" (2016)
- "Go to Work feat. TT the Artist" (2017)
- "Orange Wind" (2017)
- "PAM feat. Onjuicy" (2017)
- "Changeling Life" (2017)
- "Declare Victory" (2019)
