= Anamanaguchi =

American chiptune-based pop and rock band

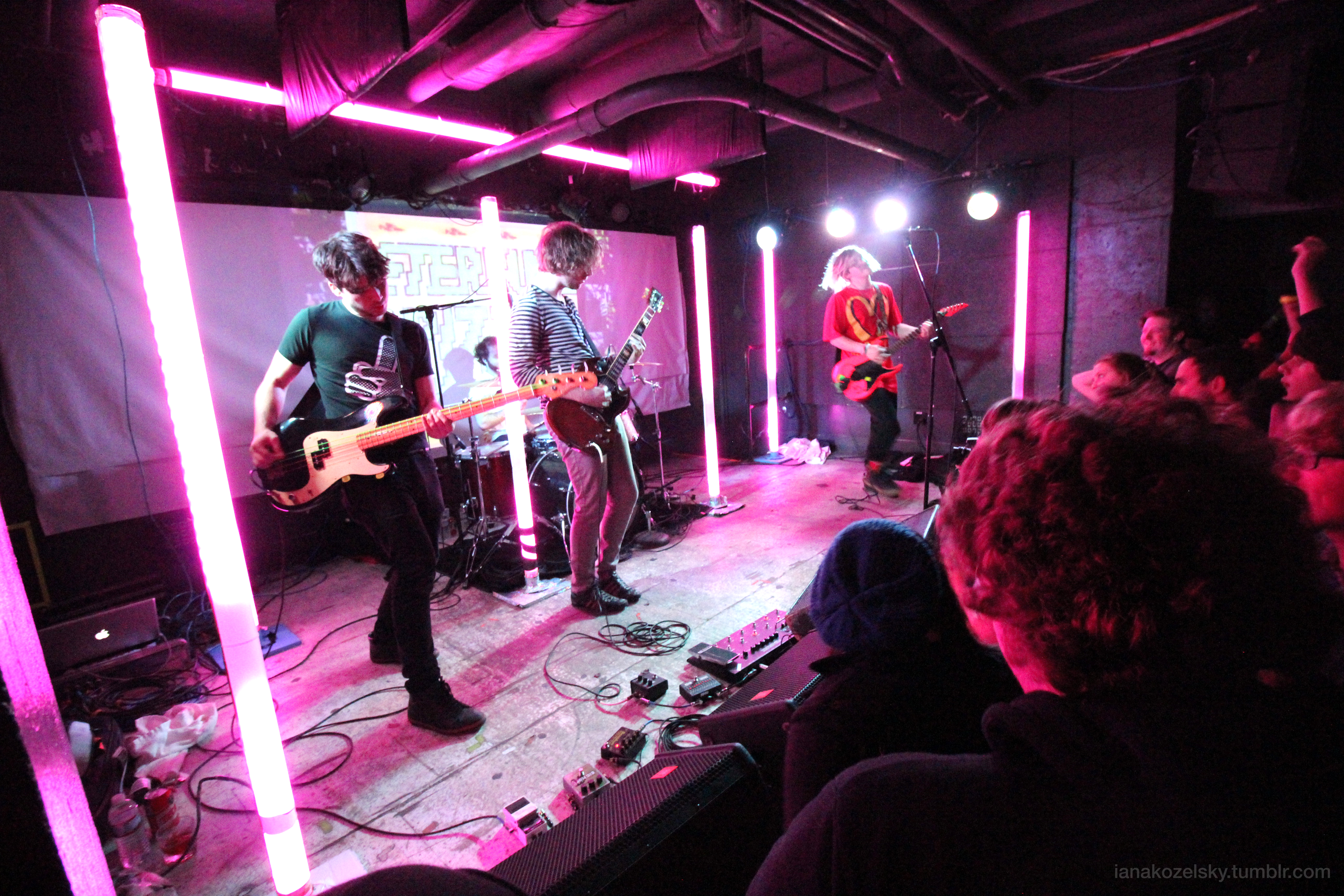
- Anamanaguchi at U Street Music Hall in Washington, D.C., in 2015.

Background information
- Origin: New York City, New York, United States
- Genres: Electronic; pop; rock; bitpop; chiptune; punk rock; indie rock; electronic rock; electropop
- Instruments: Tracker software; NES; Game Boy; personal computer; synthesizer; guitar; bass guitar; drums; vocals
- Years active: 2004–present
- Labels: 8bitpeoples; Normative; dream.hax; Alcopop!; Monstercat; Polyvinyl
- Members: Peter Berkman; James DeVito; Luke Silas; Ary Warnaar
- Past members: Charlie Hankin; Spencer Casey; George Brower
- Website: Official website

Anamanaguchi is an American chiptune-based pop and rock band from New York City. The band has four members: lead songwriters and guitarists Peter Berkman and Ary Warnaar, bassist James DeVito, and drummer Luke Silas.

Anamanaguchi combines digital electronic sounds such as those seen in chiptune and bitpop with traditional band instrumentation. As with other chiptune artists, they have created music using video game hardware from the mid- to late 1980s: namely a NES and a Game Boy.

== Career ==
=== 2004–2009: Formation, Power Supply and Dawn Metropolis ===
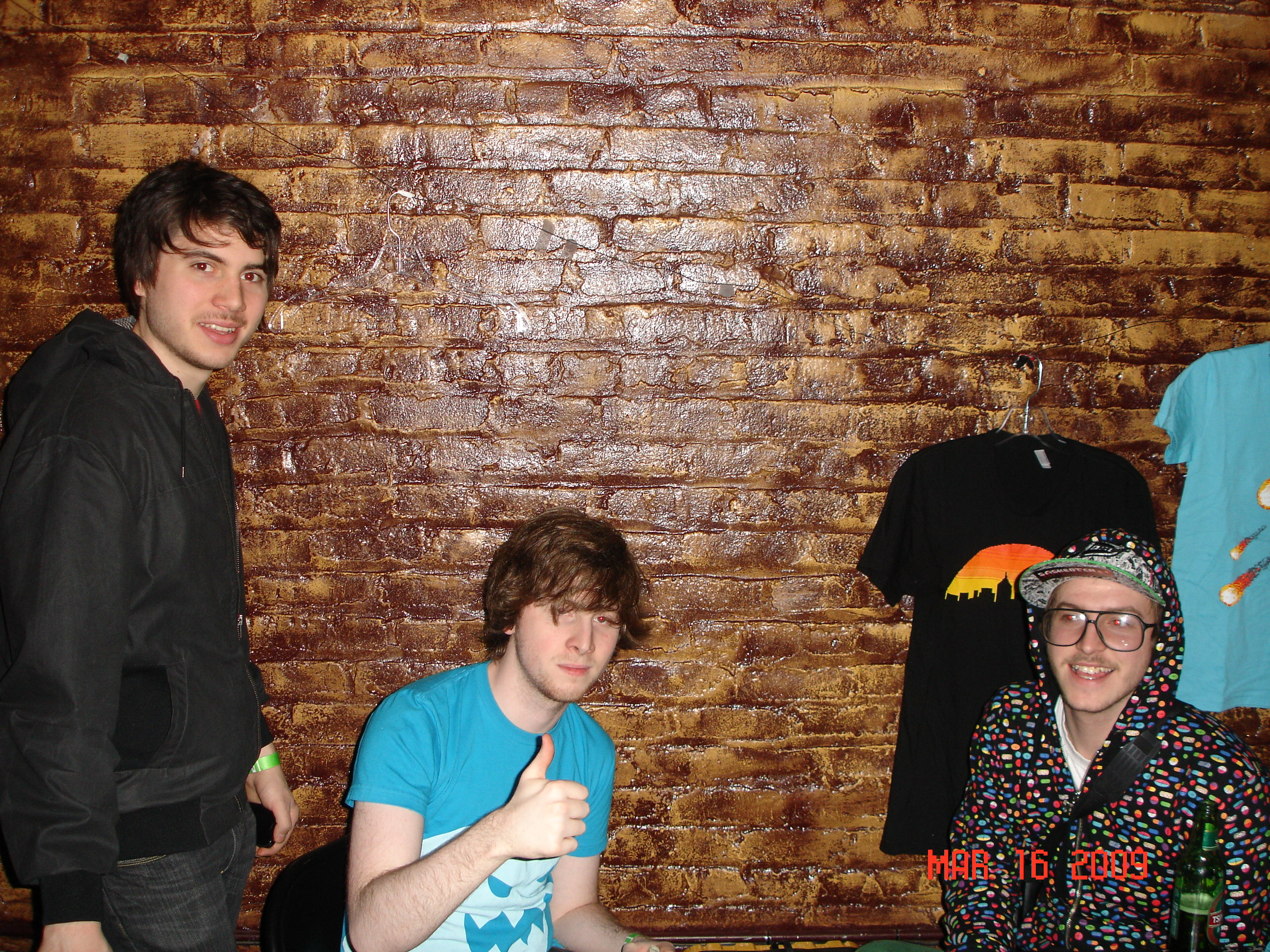
(left to right) James DeVito, Peter Berkman and Ary Warnaar in Brooklyn, New York in 2009.

Knowing each other through being classmates, Peter Berkman and James DeVito formed the band in Chappaqua, NY after Berkman and his friends would learn how to create chiptune after discovering a Wired article discussing the chiptune scenes in Sweden and New York. The name "Anamanaguchi" came about from a member in one of Berkman's former bands pronouncing gibberish in the style of Jabba the Hutt. The band first performed on January 29, 2006 at Cake Shop and through events such as Pulsewave NYC they formed a relationship with the netlabel 8bitpeoples and subsequently released their debut the EP Power Supply in August 2006. The track "Helix Nebula" was featured as the theme song of the former GamesRadar podcast TalkRadar.

Peter Berkman met Ary Warnaar at New York University where they were studying Music Technology. In 2009, Ary Warnaar and Luke Silas joined the band for the release of their following EP, Dawn Metropolis. The album was released with an accompanying website that included animated videos for each of the songs, done in collaboration with artists David Mauro and Paris Treantafeles.

A song from Dawn Metropolis titled "Jetpack Blues, Sunset Hues" is the theme to Chris Hardwick's The Nerdist Podcast. On November 26, 2013, Anamanaguchi appeared as guests on the podcast itself.

=== 2010–2012: Scott Pilgrim vs. the World and summer singles ===
In 2010, Anamanaguchi were approached by Ubisoft to compose music for the video game adaptation of the Scott Pilgrim graphic novels, Scott Pilgrim vs. the World: The Game. The soundtrack for the game was released on Amazon and iTunes by ABKCO Records on August 24, 2010. The soundtrack debuted at No. 3 on Billboard's Heatseekers chart (aka Soundscan's New Artist Chart). In the summer of 2010, Anamanaguchi began releasing a series of singles for free download on their website. These singles were released with animated gif cover art (featuring collaborations with artists such as Paul Robertson and Ryder Ripps) and were printed as limited 7" vinyl with lenticular artwork to mimic the animated images.

=== 2013–2015: Endless Fantasy ===
On May 3, 2013, Anamanaguchi launched a Kickstarter project for their album Endless Fantasy. In just 11 hours, their funding goal of $50,000 was reached. At the end of its run, the project was backed by 7,253 people who contributed to raising a grand total of $277,399, making it the second most-successful music project to be funded on Kickstarter at the time, behind that of singer Amanda Palmer.

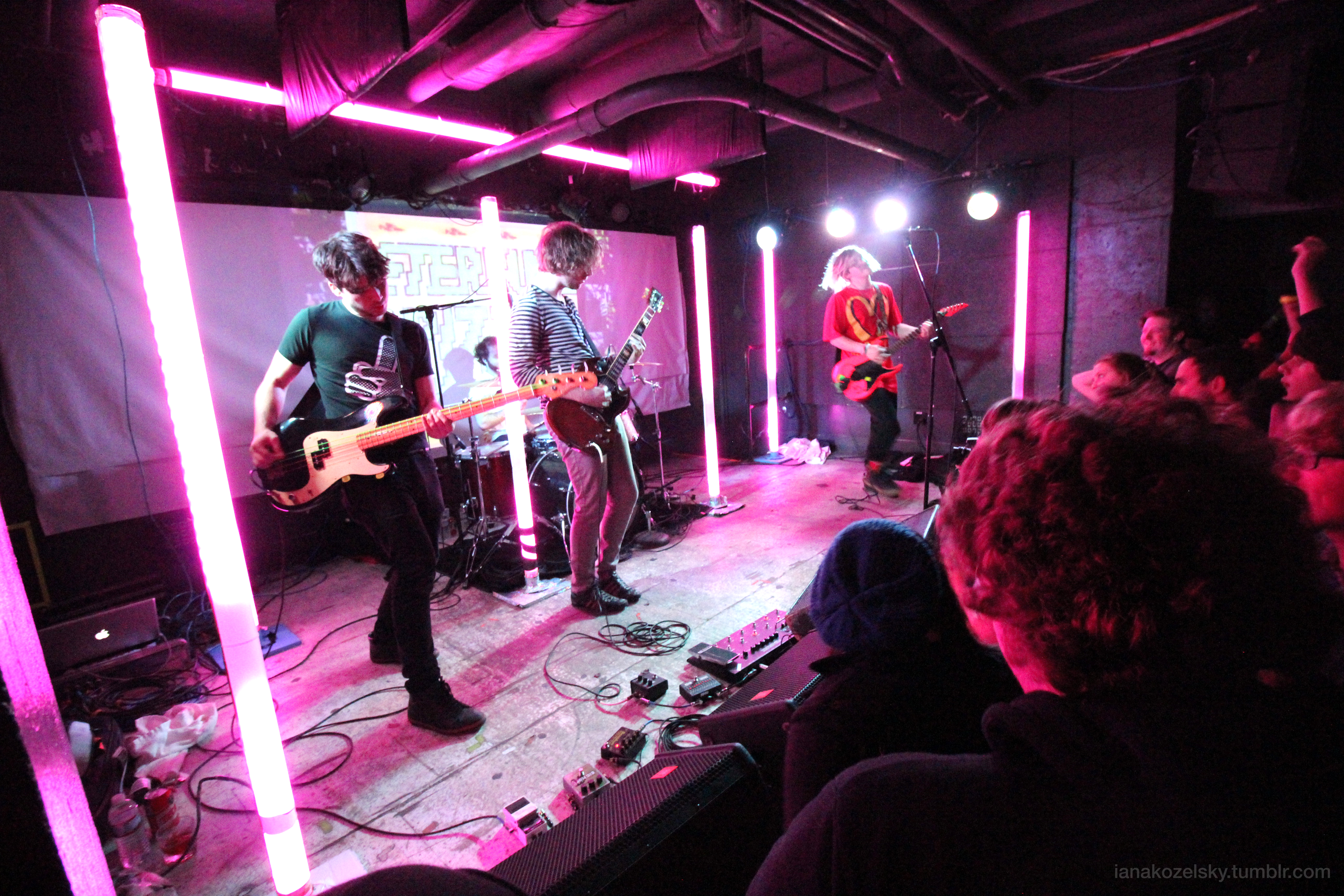
Anamanaguchi performing in 2015

Anamanaguchi featured on Late Night with Jimmy Fallon on June 17, 2013, where they played their song "Endless Fantasy" from the album of the same name. On June 19, 2014, they released a single titled "Pop It" featuring a then-unknown singer whose face was hidden from view. The song was a stylistic departure for the group in that it did not feature any chiptune elements nor traditional band instrumentation, with a lead vocal. Entertainment Weekly described the song as having "glitchy electronic flourishes and relentlessly bubble gummy vibe", also drawing comparisons to Kyary Pamyu Pamyu. In September, the song was featured in a Target TV advertisement, and in mid-2015 was also featured in a Taco Bell commercial for iced beverages. On November 24, 2014, the singer's name, "Meesh彡☆", and her face were revealed to the public.

On November 21, 2014, Anamanaguchi revealed they had been working on a new album titled [USA], which was set to release sometime in 2016. The band also stated that the album would not be a chiptune album. This album was later delayed for an undisclosed amount of time.

=== 2016–2019: Capsule Silence XXIV and [USA] ===
On March 28, 2016, the band released a role-playing first-person shooter video game called Capsule Silence XXIV which was designed by Ben Esposito along with Anamanaguchi, alongside an original score containing over 30 songs. The band "leaked" the game for free online after staging a hoax Twitter dispute with the game's fictional developer, NHX. The game also contains an unreleased video for "Japan Air", among other hidden Easter eggs. In May 2016, the band was the opening act at the North American Miku Expo tour, finishing at a two-show event at the Hammerstein Ballroom in New York City. The band returned to the stage each night and performed their single "Miku" live with Hatsune Miku for her encore. The official soundtrack of Capsule Silence XXIV was released in two parts as Capsule Silence XXIV (Original Soundtrack Vol I) on December 21, 2016, and Capsule Silence XXIV (Original Soundtrack Vol II) on October 13, 2017.

On October 19, 2017, the band announced that they would be debuting music from their third studio album, [USA], at a live show on November 10 in Brooklyn, NY. The performance was live streamed on the band's official Twitch page.

On October 18, 2018, Anamanaguchi headlined "Coalchella", a virtual music festival conducted entirely in a Minecraft server with sets broadcast live on an online radio. On January 12 the following year, Anamanaguchi headlined Fire Festival, another Minecraft music festival by Open Pit Presents, the organizers of Coalchella. Anamanaguchi also headlined Open Pit's third festival, MineGala, on September 14, 2019.

In a YouTube video released on August 20, 2019, Anamanaguchi stated that the release date of [USA] would be October 25. It released on the label Polyvinyl Records. Later they announced that the "[USA] tour originally planned for 2020 will be rescheduled to 2021 due to the COVID-19 pandemic".

=== 2020–2024: Scott Pilgrim Takes Off ===
On November 12, 2021, the band announced the Scott Pilgrim vs the World: The Game Soundtrack: The Tour, taking place in January the following year. Four days later, they released the song "Water Resistant" featuring 8485 on the label Monstercat in celebration of the then-upcoming mobile game, Rocket League: Sideswipe. On the 30th, later the same month, the band released another song titled "Dreams" with Flux Pavilion for Rocket League: Sideswipe, with the game's official soundtrack releasing shortly after, including both "Dreams" and "Water Resistant". During their Scott Pilgrim vs the World tour, they played a cover of the song "Hopes and Dreams" from the 2015 video game Undertale. They uploaded the cover to their YouTube channel on January 21, 2022. In March 2023, it was announced that Anamanaguchi would be writing original songs and co-composing the score for the Scott Pilgrim Takes Off animated series. A free update to the video game Teenage Mutant Ninja Turtles: Shredder's Revenge in September 2024 added remixed tracks by several artists, including Anamanaguchi, who remixed the track "Panic in the Sky!"

=== 2025–present: Anyway and Scott Pilgrim EX ===
In January 2025, the band released a cover of Nirvana's "Territorial Pissings".

On May 6, 2025, Anamanaguchi released the single "Darcie" and announced a new album, Anyway, which was written in the American Football House. The album's sound diverges from their chiptune style and follows a more traditional rock sound, with Pitchfork authors likening the album's sound to rock bands Ovlov and Angel Dust.

Anamanaguchi returned for the soundtrack of the video game Scott Pilgrim EX, which was released in 2026.

== Musical style and influences ==
Stylistically, Anamanaguchi is characterized as electronic, pop, rock, bitpop, chiptune, punk rock, indie rock, electronic rock and electropop.

Berkman has stated that their music is not solely influenced by video game music and that much of it is inspired by "[s]imple pop stuff, like Weezer and the Beach Boys," as well as Janet Jackson, Yasutaka Nakata, Koji Kondo, Elliott Smith and DragonForce.

Berkman stated that his top three influences in order would be "Tim & Eric and that absurd comedy, Japanese music and video games." "Ultimately, Berkman's interest in Japanese pop culture is at the root of his interest in video games."

Anamanaguchi has collaborated with several musical artists including Meesh and Pochi.

== Discography ==
=== Studio albums ===
List of studio albums, with selected chart positions
Title	Album details	Peak chart positions			
Title	Album details	US Album Sales	US Dance	US Heat.	US Ind.
Dawn Metropolis	Released: March 3, 2009; Label: Normative; Formats: CD, digital download, vinyl	—	—	—	—
Endless Fantasy	Released: May 14, 2013; Label: dream.hax; Formats: CD, digital download, vinyl	102	2	1	21
[USA]	Released: October 25, 2019; Label: Polyvinyl; Formats: CD, digital download, vinyl	63	—	3	7
Anyway	Released: August 8, 2025; Label: Polyvinyl; Formats: CD, digital download, vinyl	—	—	—	—
"—" denotes items which failed to chart.

=== Soundtracks ===
Title	Album details	Peak chart positions			
Title	Album details	US	US Dance	US Heat.	UK Soundtrack
Scott Pilgrim vs. the World: The Game (Original Videogame Soundtrack)	Released: August 24, 2010; Label: ABKCO; Formats: Digital download, vinyl	180	7	3	—
Capsule Silence XXIV (Original Soundtrack Vol I)	Released: December 21, 2016; Label: NHX; Formats: Digital download, cassette	—	—	—	—
Capsule Silence XXIV (Original Soundtrack Vol II)	Released: October 13, 2017; Label: NHX; Formats: Digital download	—	—	—	—
Scott Pilgrim Takes Off (Soundtrack from the Netflix Series) (with Joseph Trapanese)	Released: November 17, 2023; Label: Lakeshore Records; Formats: Digital download, vinyl	—	—	—	34
Scott Pilgrim EX (Original Soundtrack)	Released: March 4, 2026; Label: Polyvinyl; Formats: Digital download, vinyl, CD	—	—	—	—
"—" denotes items which failed to chart.

=== Compilation albums ===
- Frug 4 Lyfe (2011) A compilation CD that was sold at live shows contains the 2010 summer singles and two live tracks.
- Single + Remix Collections. The album was released exclusively in Japan on March 4, 2012. The album compiles all of the singles from the band's summer of singles along with all the tracks from Power Supply. As well as these tracks, it includes two previously unreleased remixes of Anamanaguchi tracks.
- Summer Singles 2010/2020 (2021) A compilation album that contains the 2010 and 2020 summer singles.

=== Extended plays ===
Title	Details
Power Supply	Released: August 26, 2006; Label: 8bitpeoples; Format: Digital download, vinyl
Dawn Metropolis Preview	Released: March 3, 2009; Label: Self-released; Format: Digital download

=== Singles ===
Year	Title	Album
2010	"Airbrushed"	Summer Singles
2010	"My Skateboard Will Go On"	Summer Singles
2010	"Aurora (Meet Me in the Stars)"	Summer Singles
2010	"Airbrushed" (RAC remix)	Summer Singles
2010	"Mess"	Summer Singles
2011	"My Skateboard Will Go On"	Split w/ Starscream
2013	"Meow"	Endless Fantasy
2013	"Endless Fantasy"	Endless Fantasy
2014	"Prom Night"	Endless Fantasy
2014	"Pop It" (featuring Meesh)	Non-album single
2016	"Miku" (featuring Hatsune Miku)	Hatsune Miku Expo 2016 E.P.
2019	"Lorem Ipsum (Arctic Anthem)"	[USA]
2019	"Air On Line"	[USA]
2019	"On My Own" (featuring Hana)	[USA]
2020	"Styla"	Summer Singles 2020
2020	"Kei" (featuring Pochi)	Summer Singles 2020
2020	"Get Your Wish" (Anamanaguchi Remix)	Summer Singles 2020
2020	"Vancouver"	Summer Singles 2020
2020	"Everyday, Everynight" (featuring Planet 1999)	Summer Singles 2020
2020	"Pixel Candle"	Summer Singles 2020
2020	"Jaime" (featuring Jaime Brooks)	Summer Singles 2020
2020	"Stay Home" (American Football cover)	Summer Singles 2020
2021	"Water Resistant" (featuring 8485)	Rocket League: Sideswipe (Original Soundtrack), Vol. 1
2021	"Dreams" (with Flux Pavilion)	Rocket League: Sideswipe (Original Soundtrack), Vol. 1
2022	"'Hopes and Dreams" (Toby Fox cover)	Non-album single
2025	"Territorial Pissings" (Nirvana cover)	Non-album single
2025	"Miss the Rage" (Mario Judah cover)	Non-album single
2025	"Darcie"	Anyway
2025	"Magnet"	Anyway
2025	"Rage (Kitchen Sink)"	Anyway
2025	"Buckwild"	Anyway
2026	"Yeah I Guess"	Non-album single
2026	"Sucker Punch"	Non-album single

=== Remixes ===
Year	Track	Original Artist	Album
2010	"Rainbow in the Dark"	Das Racist	My Skateboard Will Go On
2011	"Too Dramatic"	Ra Ra riot	—N/a
2012	"Sisterly"	Fang Island	Sisterly
2013	"Coming Home (featuring Neverstore)"	Futurecop!	Coming Home (Remixes)
2013	"Overexposed"	Matt and Kim	Lighting Remixes
2014	"Kill Your Radio"	HEARTSREVOLUTION	—N/a
2014	"Sad Machine"	Porter Robinson	Worlds (Limited Edition Box Set)
2014	"Girls Just Want to Have Fun"	Cyndi Lauper	She's So Unusual: REMiXED
2014	"Pretty Green"	Spinee	Pretty Green
2015	"Feel The Lightning"	Dan Deacon	—N/a
2017	"ひゅるり"	Osaka✮Shunkashuto	—N/a
2017	"Not Mine"	Lil Miquela	—N/a
2018	"Always,"	Meishi Smile / LLLL / U-Pistol	—N/a
2020	"Get Your Wish"	Porter Robinson	Nurture
2021	"My Agenda (featuring Village People and Pussy Riot)"	Dorian Electra	My Agenda
2026	"Glacier (In Memory of RS)"	Purity Ring	Transmutations

=== Music videos ===
List of music videos with director(s)
Title	Year	Director(s)
"Meow"	2013	Daniel Gray Longino and Eric Notarnicola with Anamanaguchi
"Endless Fantasy"	2013	Anamanaguchi
"Pop It (feat. meesh彡☆)"	2014	Unknown, possibly none
"Miku" (Japanese version)	2017	Unknown, possibly none
"Air On Line"	2019	Anamanaguchi
"Up To You"	2020	Unknown, possibly none
"Kei ft. POCHI"	2020	Unknown, possibly none
"Vancouver"	2020	Unknown, possibly none
"Jaime (feat. Jaime Brooks)"	2020	SCOTTY2HOTTY69
"Everyday, Everynight (ft. Planet 1999)"	2021	Unknown, possibly none

== Filmography ==
=== Television ===
Year	Title	Role	Notes
2012; 2017–18	Bravest Warriors	Composer	Peter Berkman wrote the opening song with Jon Baken
2013	The Chris Gethard Show	Musical Guest	Episode 79: Race to the Top – performed "Meow" and "Space Wax America"
2013	Late Night with Jimmy Fallon	Musical Guest	Episode 854: Do Not Game List, "Xbox One" Demo – performed "Endless Fantasy"
2023	Scott Pilgrim Takes Off	Composer / Performer / Producer	Wrote, performed, and produced many songs for the official soundtrack
