= Neon White =

2022 video game

- Developer: Angel Matrix
- Publisher: Annapurna Interactive
- Designer: Ben Esposito
- Writers: Ryann Shannon; Aevee Bee
- Composer: Machine Girl
- Engine: Unity
- Platforms: Microsoft Windows; Nintendo Switch; PlayStation 4; PlayStation 5; Xbox One; Xbox Series X/S
- Release: Windows, Switch; June 16, 2022; PS4, PS5; December 13, 2022; Xbox One, Series X/S; July 11, 2024
- Genres: First-person shooter, puzzle-platform
- Mode: Single-player

Neon White is a 2022 first-person shooter and puzzle-platforming game developed by Angel Matrix and published by Annapurna Interactive. The game was released for Microsoft Windows and the Nintendo Switch on June 16, 2022. It was released on PlayStation 4 and PlayStation 5 on December 13, 2022, and it was also released on July 11, 2024 for Xbox One and Xbox Series X/S.

Designed around speedrunning, Neon White puts the player in the role of a Neon, tasked with clearing all the demons within a level in the fastest time possible. The game uses playing cards to represent weapons, which can be discarded to perform special moves like double-jumping and dashing. The game was written by Ryann Shannon, writer for OK K.O.! Let's Be Heroes; and Aevee Bee, writer for We Know the Devil.

== Gameplay ==
Gameplay screenshot

Neon White features a group known as Neons, sinners taken from Hell in an annual competition to clean up demons in Heaven for a chance to stay there. Neons are required to wear masks that explode if they disobey orders, remove the masks, or break the rules given to them. Each of the hundred Neons in the competition contend against each other for the position of top Neon. The player takes the role of the titular Neon White, an assassin who is competing for the first time. White receives daily missions from the angel Mikey, and meets up with old crewmates of his, all while dealing with amnesia that prevents him from recalling his past life.

The game is composed of several missions, each made up of multiple levels. To complete a level, the player must defeat all the demons present and reach a crystal-like goal, which additionally grants the player experience "Insight" which can unlock the ability to see alternate routes and hidden items in levels. The player traverses the level by running and jumping, collecting Soul Cards lying about in the open or obtained from defeating demons. Soul Cards can be used as weapons with each card having a standard firing mode and an alternate special ability that is activated by discarding it. As an example, the handgun card can be discarded to perform a double jump. The player can die if they take too much damage from demons or fall off the map, requiring them to restart the level. Once the player completes a level, they receive a medal based their completion time, ranging from Bronze, Silver, Gold, and Ace. If the player reaches a certain preset time, they will earn a secret type of medal known in the community as a "red medal". These are awarded for completing the level faster than the game's director, Ben Esposito.

Between levels, players can interact with NPCs in the hub world of heaven. Alongside completing challenge missions by ranking up confidants, players can enter relationships with the NPCs during this section of the game. Progressing onto new missions may also require the player to have earned a specific neon rank, reflecting the number of levels the player has obtained a gold or better time medal on. Players can return to any previous level to try to earn better time scores to progress further into the game.

== Plot ==
The amnesiac Neon White awakens in Heaven alongside other sinners who have been chosen from Hell. They are informed by the Believers, a group of beings who claim to speak for God, that they are "Neons" whom God has judged "most unfavorably". Their only chance at salvation is through the Ten Days of Judgement competition, held annually to cull the demons infesting Heaven. The Neon who can kill the most demons by the competition's end will receive a mechanical halo that will allow them to stay in Heaven for a year. White and the other Neons are given weapons and masks that if removed, will explode. The Believers can also detonate the masks to execute any Neon who steps out of line. As the competition begins, White meets fellow Neons Yellow, Violet, and Red, all of whom vaguely claim to have known him in his past life, and the angels Mikey and Gabby, who manage the Neons' assignments.

During a daily sermon from the Believers, White meets Neon Green, the current bearer of the mechanical halo, who is feared for killing other Neons. Later, Violet tells White about the Old City, an abandoned area of Heaven rumored to have powerful weapons. Red warns White against going there since Green uses it as his hunting grounds, but White ignores this and proceeds to the Old City with Yellow. The pair encounter Green, and Yellow is killed when he blocks an attack meant for White. As Green makes his escape after being defeated by White, he explains that the Believers crafted his halo using a page from the Book of Death, and promises that he has plans for White. Following the confrontation, White learns of the counterpart Book of Life, and decides to seek it out as his suspicions about the competition and the Believers mount.

White catches up with Green, who tells him the Book of Life is at Heaven's Edge. Red intervenes to prevent a second fight, and reveals their shared past: White, Red, Yellow, and Violet had worked together as a crew of assassins under the leadership of Green, and their last operation had been to assassinate Blue, who was Green's old boss. They all died during the mission, although Green successfully killed Blue. The next day, Mikey refuses White's request to be assigned to Heaven's Edge, explaining that he knows the competition is a sham and that he would rather see White for ten days every year than risk him being unable to return to Heaven ever again. White and Red venture into Heaven's Edge anyway, but Mikey catches up to them and divulges the truth. Heaven was originally Sheol, but Sheol did not live up to the Believers' expectations of the afterlife and they eventually overthrew God to seize his books and remake the realm into their ideal version of paradise. The Believers also killed most of the angels during the war, and only spared those angels who swore loyalty and service to them. The Believers defeated God and acquired the Book of Death, but God closed his hands around the Book of Life and the Inkhorn used to write into both divine books, preventing the Believers from gaining total power over Heaven and leaving it vulnerable to demonic invasion. As Mikey concludes his story, he notices a stray page from the Book of Life that White found earlier, giving White a way to seek out the location of the full book.

White arrives at the Third Temple, where he finds one of God's hands clenched around the Book of Life. The hand opens at White's approach, but Violet, who was slighted by White earlier, swoops in and snatches the book, only for Green to fatally wound her. As White and Green clash, Green's mechanical halo is broken, freeing him from the Believers' control. The vengeful Green declares he will use the books to destroy Heaven, but Violet stymies his plan by blowing herself up and scattering the Book of Life's pages. Green returns to Outer Heaven and steals the Book of Death from the Believers, preventing them from detonating the Neons' masks. All of the remaining Neons begin to riot throughout Heaven, and Green kills off the Believers. Meanwhile, White uses the remaining page of the Book of Life to recover its pages and reassemble it.

Once the Book of Life is whole, White turns his attention to the Inkhorn, the last item needed to bring back God. In the course of the search, Mikey reveals to White that the sinners who float up to Heaven are free of guilt, which make them the best Neons as they are unquestioning; White had been weighed down by guilt, but he ascended to Heaven anyway because Red pulled him up, and this unusual method of entry caused his amnesia. God's other hand is found, but it lies outside Heaven and Green stated that a soul is needed to trigger the process to push it into Heaven so it can reopen the firmament. Red sacrifices herself by detonating her mask, and Green and White have a final duel over the Books and the Inkhorn. White is once again victorious, and the angels undertake the ritual to restore God. However, Green reappears and charges at White, intent on writing everyone's names into the Book of Death.

If White failed to collect enough gifts to unlock all of his memories, White's only option is to write Green's name into the Book of Death, wherein Green is transformed into a demon and sent to Hell. God then writes Yellow, Violet, and Red's names into the Book of Life, but excludes White because he failed to earn salvation, and because he broke protocol for writing names into the Book of Life. If all memories have been unlocked, White is given a second option to write Green's name into the Book of Life, forgiving Green for his actions and showing that White can let go of his past issues but not before Green raves about it. After this, God, pleased, writes White's name into the book with the rest of his crew.

== Development ==
Lead designer Ben Esposito created an initial prototype of Neon White as a first-person shooter in 2017 while he was finishing development of Donut County as a distraction from that work. Once Donut County was released in 2018, Esposito returned to the prototype to continue its development. Around that time, the roguelike deck-building game Slay the Spire had just been released and created a wave of card-based games in the indie games space. Esposito has said the decision to use cards instead of actual weapons in the game is one of the game's design goals stating that players should look at cards not as weapons, but instead as resources that allow greater movement.

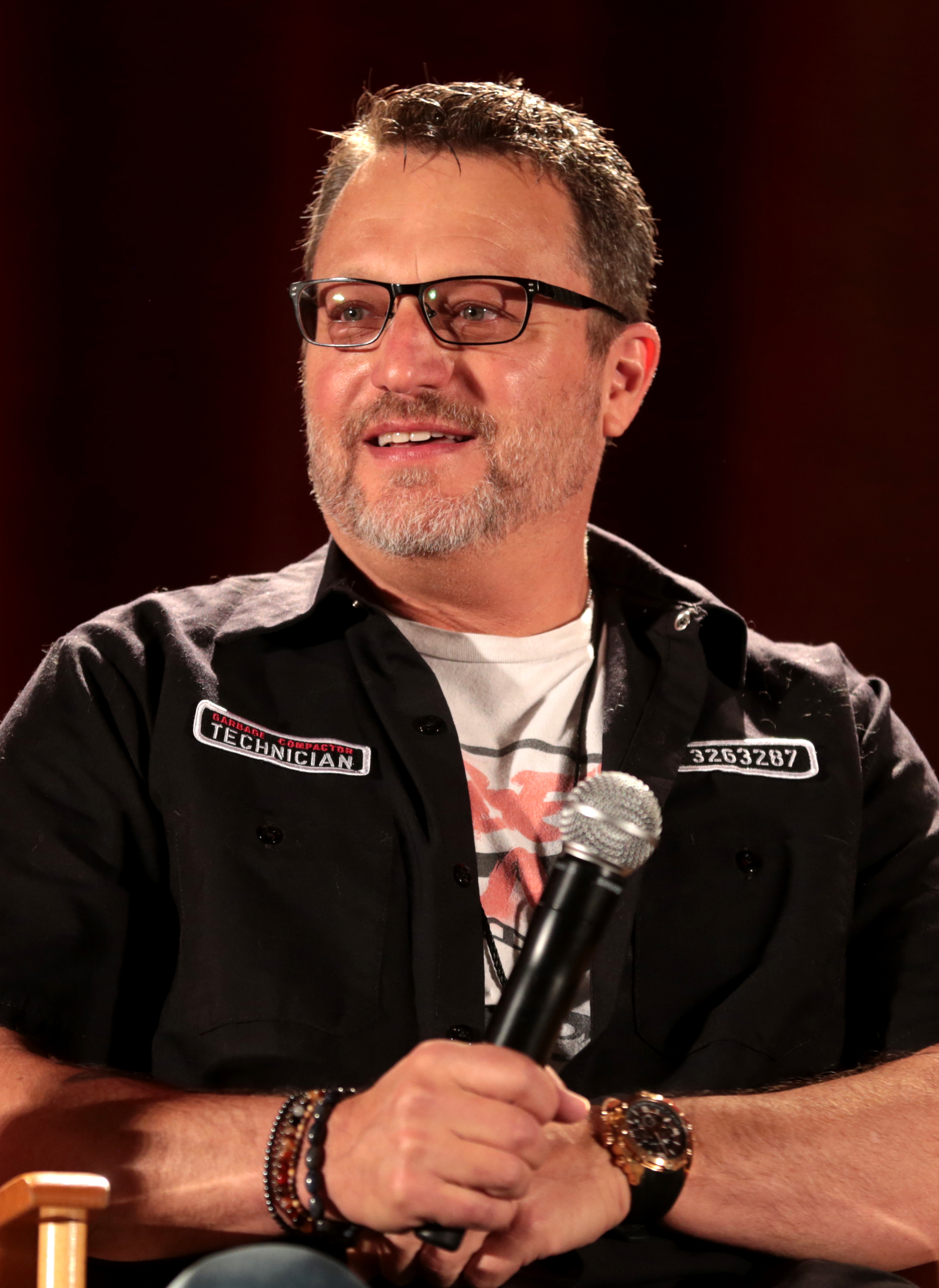
Steve Blum was cast as the lead character, Neon White.

The card idea concept led to the game being what Esposito called a "card-based arena shooter with a lot of randomness built in". However, he found that randomly rewarding the player with cards made the game more difficult, and instead decided to fix what cards the players would get, which led to the game to be more about speedrunning. Esposito said that speedrun videos influenced these ideas, as "super-high level [speedrunning] becomes a little bit less about your execution and more about solving a puzzle to shave off some time". He wanted to make sure that players had one obvious route to complete each level but had clues that encouraged the player to look for shortcuts or alternate uses of the cards.

Esposito said they initially had problems with playtesters simply beating each level and not returning to try to improve their time. Besides adding the Neon Rank system which forced players to return, they also had to find ways to prevent players from being discouraged from trying to improve their times. This led to the idea of revealing both friends' and global scoreboards only after the player beat the level with certain goals, as well as adding the ghost support and shortcut hints when the player was likely working to improve their times. Additionally, they set themselves a design goal that each level had at least one major shortcut that would be necessary to achieve the Ace medal rank in the absence of any other mistakes. This led to setting target times for each other medal rank based on how less skilled players perform. However, they found that their own performances were too good and generated times that were unlikely to be met by most players, so they used their own ghost runs adjusted with small imperfections to dial in more reasonable times for these medals.

Esposito brought in more development help in 2019 to build out from these ideas, naming the team Angel Matrix, a nod to 1990s anime. Treating the game as a puzzle game, Esposito took out some of the elements normally found in first-person shooters, such as the visual presentation of the gun, or the limit on carrying only one of any type of gun. He brought on team members to help on the game's visual and character design, including Aevee Bee, Ryann Shannon, and his wife Geneva Hodgson.

In May 2022, Steve Blum, Alicyn Packard, Courtney Lin, Ian Jones-Quartey, SungWon Cho, Zeno Robinson, Salli Saffioti, Ben Lepley and Bruce Barker were announced to have voice-acting roles in the game.

In June 2022, the game was announced at Summer Game Fest 2022 to have an official release date of June 16, 2022 on Nintendo Switch and Microsoft Windows. Ports for the PlayStation 4 and PlayStation 5 were released on December 13, 2022.

== Reception ==
Reception

Aggregate score
Aggregator	Score
Metacritic	(PC) 89/100 (NS) 88/100 (PS5) 88/100

Review scores
Publication	Score
Destructoid	8.5/10
Eurogamer	Recommended
Game Informer	9.5/10
GameSpot	9/10
Giant Bomb	5/5
Hardcore Gamer	4.5/5
IGN	8/10
Nintendo Life	9/10
Nintendo World Report	8/10
PC Gamer (US)	85/100
Shacknews	9/10
The Guardian	5/5

Neon White received "generally favorable" reviews on Windows, Nintendo Switch, and PlayStation 5, according to review aggregator website Metacritic.

Eric Van Allen of Destructoid praised the game's angular aesthetics, philosophical story, speedrun-incentivizing level design, and endearing characters and voicework, writing, "[Neon White]'s a blood-pumping, speed-infused anime shooter with style and a decent bit of heart." Eurogamer's Oisin Kuhnke recommended the game, lauding its story, themes, and anime influences while primarily praising its speedrunning-centric core gameplay loop, stating, "Neon White has some of the best level design I've ever played in an arcade-style game...the adrenaline I felt when I squeezed in that first place time within less than a millisecond wasn't like any I'd felt before." Blake Hester of Game Informer wrote, "Neon White is my favorite game I've played all year – by a large margin...It's one of the most fun games I've played in years," and cited the "top-notch" level design, "stupid-but-charming" story, "precise and intricate" gameplay, and Japanese action game aesthetic akin to Killer7 and El Shaddai as the game's strengths.

GameSpot's Richard Wakeling appreciated the title's replay value and inspired card-based mechanics while calling it "a flawless marriage between level design and player improvement", but noted the slow-paced story and weak writing. Dan Ryckert of Giant Bomb gave the game a perfect score of 5 stars while likening the game's aesthetics to 90s video game magazines "claiming that a game would cause any variety of extreme maladies", and said, "It gets its hooks in deep and fast, but the true fun and challenge in Neon White becomes apparent the more you play it."

Scott McCrae of Nintendo Life gave heavy praise to the intense and satisfying gunplay, great writing and performances, high replay value, fantastic visuals, and energetic soundtrack. PC Gamer likened Neon White's visual style to that of a Dreamcast game, and wrote, "If you can ignore (or better yet, embrace) the cringe, however, Neon White is still a blisteringly stylish speedrunning platformer." Shacknews' Morgan Shaver praised the agency the game gave to the player and the experimentation it encouraged, writing, "You really get a nice, exhilarating speedrunning feeling in Neon White with the multiple ways in which you can clear a level, both conventional and unconventional." While noting that collectable locations later in the game could be a bit obtuse, The Verge wrote that "those forced replays showed me how the game really works — and now, I actually want to replay stages until I’ve perfected my run".

=== Accolades ===
Awards and nominations for Neon White
Year	Award	Category	Result	Ref.
2022	Golden Joystick Awards	Ultimate Game of the Year	Nominated	
2022	Golden Joystick Awards	PC Game of the Year	Nominated	
2022	Golden Joystick Awards	Best Indie Game	Nominated	
2022	The Game Awards 2022	Best Independent Game	Nominated	
2022	The Game Awards 2022	Best Action Game	Nominated	
2022	The Game Awards 2022	Best Debut Indie Game	Nominated	
2023	Steam Awards	Most Innovative Gameplay	Nominated	
2023	New York Game Awards	Off Broadway Award for Best Indie Game	Nominated	
2023	26th Annual D.I.C.E. Awards	Action Game of the Year	Nominated	
2023	26th Annual D.I.C.E. Awards	Outstanding Achievement for an Independent Game	Nominated	
2023	23rd Game Developers Choice Awards	Game of the Year	Honorable mention	
2023	23rd Game Developers Choice Awards	Best Visual Art	Honorable mention	
2023	23rd Game Developers Choice Awards	Innovation Award	Nominated	
2023	23rd Game Developers Choice Awards	Best Design	Nominated	
2023	23rd Game Developers Choice Awards	Best Debut	Nominated	
2023	23rd Game Developers Choice Awards	Best Audio	Honorable mention	
2023	Independent Games Festival	Seumas McNally Grand Prize	Nominated	
2023	Independent Games Festival	Excellence in Design	Nominated	
2023	Independent Games Festival	Excellence in Audio	Honorable mention	

== Soundtrack ==
Neon White OST 1 - The Wicked Heart

Soundtrack album by Machine Girl
- Released: June 16, 2022
- Length: 1:23:10

Neon White OST 2 - The Burn That Cures

Soundtrack album by Machine Girl
- Released: June 16, 2022
- Length: 1:06:59

Neon White's soundtrack was created by Machine Girl, who was specifically sought after by lead designer Ben Esposito after hearing their 2020 EP RePorpoised Phantasies. Esposito, a fan of theirs since the release of their album Gemini in 2015, reached out to them over email to propose the project as something they could do at home during COVID-19 lockdown. Lead artist Matt Stephenson accepted after determining that Esposito wasn't "just some kid in his bedroom making a video game", and began sharing a large quantity of unfinished demos to work through and use in the game after Esposito stated that he wanted the soundtrack to continue in the direction of the sound of RePorpoised Phantasies. Esposito estimates that about half of the tracks in the final game were culled from these demos, while the other half were original compositions created just for Neon White; he also estimated that about half of the overall tracks that were created for the game were cut.

For the soundtrack, Esposito wanted the music to fit the vibe of a "lost PS2 or Dreamcast game" and would send Stephenson soundtracks from games of that era as inspiration, such as those of the Jet Set Radio and Ape Escape series, with Stephenson also citing Mick Gordon's work for the Doom series as inspiration for some late game music. During the later stages of development, Machine Girl began live touring while still working on music for the game, and Stephenson would create chiller compositions in order to de-stress. "Peace of Mind", the main theme for the game's hub world, was created during a particularly stressful day for them as they were running "super late" for a show and one of the van passengers had become car sick. Machine Girl released the soundtrack to Bandcamp and streaming services to coincide with the release of the game, splitting it into two volumes, with the first volume containing songs from the main missions and sidequests, while the second album features the non-gameplay tracks playing throughout the game.
