= Tattletail =

2016 video game

- Steam storefront header
- Developer: Waygetter Electronics
- Publisher: Little Flag Software
- Director: Ben Esposito
- Designers: Ben Esposito; Thomas Astle; Geneva Hodgson
- Programmer: Tom Astle
- Artists: Ben Esposito; Geneva Hodgson
- Writers: Geneva Hodgson; Tom Astle
- Composer: Ben Esposito
- Engine: Unity
- Platforms: Microsoft Windows; Mac OS; Android
- Release: WW: December 28, 2016
- Mode: Single-player

Tattletail is a 2016 survival horror video game created by Waygetter Electronics and published by Little Flag Software. The player must care for their virtual pet toy, Baby Talking Tattletail, while avoiding the pursuit of its recalled predecessor, Mama Tattletail (commonly referred to as "Mama"). The game was released on Steam on December 28, 2016.

Two updates were released, one adding multiple endings and the other adding an expansion campaign that takes place after the main game's campaign. During the expansion there is a mysterious person giving the player notes referencing that they failed to fix their memories.

== Gameplay ==
Five nights before Christmas, the player sneaks into the basement to open their present early. The gift turns out to be a Baby Talking Tattletail, a Furby-like talking plush toy. For the five nights leading up to Christmas, the player must tend to their Baby Talking Tattletail toy by feeding it, grooming it, and allowing it to charge, while completing a set of objectives each night. While the Baby Tattletail is not a threat, it is prone to generating a lot of sound when its three needs are not met, alerting Mama Tattletail of their location. While completing a set task, the player must avoid Mama by staying quiet when she is near. Failure to do so, or going too close, will result in Mama attacking the player in a jumpscare.

Players acquire a shakable, glow-in-the-dark flashlight to navigate in the darkness, but Mama Tattletail has the ability to "kill" their flashlight when they point it directly at her. Baby Tattletail is also afraid of the dark and is quite vocal about it, creating a necessity to recharge the flashlight by shaking it quickly. However, shaking it generates sound, so the player must be careful about when and where to shake.

Over the course of the game, a series of various "Gift Eggs," presumably laid by the Tattletails, are placed throughout the house. Collecting all of the eggs will result in the player achieving the "good ending" of the game.

== Plot ==
The game takes place in 1998 through five nights, beginning on December 20 and ending on Christmas Day. The player wakes up on Night 1 to open their Christmas present early. The present is the new fad toy, a purple Baby Talking Tattletail (based on a Furby). After playing with the toy briefly (which involves feeding and grooming him), the player puts him back into his box and goes back to bed.

On Night 2, the player finds the same Tattletail in the tumble dryer, with no indication of how he got there. The player then charges him, wraps him back up into his box, and goes back to bed.

On Night 3, the player encounters the contents of an old nursery in the basement. In the corner sits the now-recalled Mama Tattletail, along with a cassette tape which can be played using the toy (similar to Teddy Ruxpin). The tape contains a snippet from a story in a read-along style – including prompts to "turn the page" – about how "the children thought that Mama would never find them as long as she couldn't see them" but Mama would find them nevertheless by the sounds they make. The player returns upstairs to find that Tattletail has made a mess. Tattletail asks to be taken to "Mama". The player returns to the spot to find that Mama has disappeared. The now-hostile Mama Tattletail then starts to hunt down the player while they try to clean up after Tattletail.

On Night 4, after a lengthy hide-and-seek session with another Tattletail, the player finds a VHS tape that shows several interchangeable camera feeds from what seems to be a Tattletail commercial (which is footage from the trailer). After some time, a few of the camera feeds' names turn red, the lighting changes from blue to green, and trash bags and obscured parts of inanimate or writhing human bodies appear.

On Christmas Eve, Baby Talking Tattletail invites the player to the basement to join a "party" with yellow and blue Baby Talking Tattletails called Butternut and Dewdrop (respectively), with two more that the player must fetch. After the player gets them, they must pick up Tattletail and get some supplies from upstairs (Christmas lights, cupcakes, and candles). The player returns to the basement to find that the Baby Talking Tattletails have made a pentagram out of the Christmas lights with the VHS tape in the middle, and have begun chanting in a séance. After rewinding the VHS tape, Mama appears and steals the candles and the player must find them in vases scattered around the basement while avoiding being attacked by Mama. Once the séance reaches its climax, the tape begins to levitate and the player must destroy it. The séance then ends and the player goes back to bed.

=== Endings ===
On Christmas Day, the ending of the game depends on whether the player has collected all 22 eggs laid out across the game:

- Bad Ending: If the player fails to collect all 22 eggs, it takes longer to open the present, and Mama Tattletail’s chase theme will begin to play. The gift box’s bow comes off and the lid’s position is slightly altered. The player then has to attempt to open it again, only to find the gift box is empty. Mama Tattletail then jump scares the player (implying that the ritual failed), ending the game and rolling the credits. This ending was the original canon ending before the release of "The Gift" Update.
- Good Ending: If the player manages to collect all 22 eggs, their present is revealed to be the same Baby Talking Tattletail the player received when opening it 5 days early. Tattletail will then proceed to give the player a series of gifts – his birth tag and a golden flashlight. The player will then need to open the door of their mother's room and wake her up, triggering a white screen. The game ends with Tattletail saying "Thank you" to the player, along with the player's mother yawning. This ending is considered canon in the Kaleidoscope DLC.
- Joke Ending: If the player falls out of the map with Tattletail in their hands, Tattletail will begin to glitch out and start saying that the player broke "it". The game then ends and the credits roll. Although technically this ending was a glitch, it was awarded soon by the Waygetter Company with its own Tattletail dialogue. This ending will result in returning to the main menu with no progress.

=== The Kaleidoscope DLC ===
In the free Kaleidoscope DLC, the player awakens on Christmas Day to find their present, a purple Baby Talking Tattletail. However, it looks slightly different, talks in a boring monotonous voice, and then glitches out. At the front door, the player finds a package and an anonymous letter claiming that Tattletail "wasn't like this" and "this isn't how it happened at all". The player then gradually remembers one night back and has to play through each night again in reverse order with the events and circumstances of the nights being similar, except Mama is now a friendly and caring character. Each night "ends" with a letter explaining that something went wrong, and the final letter explains that a place called the Kaleidoscope, where all memories are stored, is what is causing the changes. The player is then offered the choice to either go back to bed or enter the dangerous Kaleidoscope. Going to the Kaleidoscope results in the "good" ending in which the player will retrieve their memories. Going to bed results in the "bad" ending in which Tattletail will stay boring forever.

In the Kaleidoscope, the environment looks like a glitched, warped version of the house lit in a bluish tint. The player eventually finds a VHS tape with a letter saying that it must be played to restore the player's memories; it contains a slightly different version of the Tattletail TV advert with 2 glitches. Once the tape is played, night one is repeated, with Tattletail restored to its cheery self; and Mama restored to its aggressive self. As the player is about to wrap Tattletail back up, it tells a joke but is interrupted by Mama, and the player is transported back to the Kaleidoscope.

The player must then traverse back to the entrance of the Kaleidoscope without being killed by Mama. After escaping, the player wakes up on Christmas Day again and opens the gift. Once it is open, Tattletail gives the player a present with a final letter that praises the player and tells the player to say Hi to Tattletail for them. After Mama's grinding sound is heard, Tattletail then tells another joke to the player by telling them "me love you!", ending the game.

== Development ==
The game was published under the name of the in-universe fictional toy company named Waygetter Electronics. In reality, the team is led by game designer Ben Esposito, and consists of character designer/co-developer Geneva Hodgson along with lead programmer Tom Astle, Cartoonist and later writer for OK K.O.! Let's Be Heroes. Ryann Shannon also stars as the voice of Talking Tattletail while Hodgson voiced Mama.

== Reception ==
The game has received criticism for its resemblance to the Five Nights at Freddy's series for featuring similar elements, including its visual aesthetic, five-day time limit, and animatronic-based antagonists. GameSpew's Chris McMullen praised its more structured gameplay, as well as its reproduction of 1990s childhood fears.
