= Bubsy 3D: Bubsy Visits the James Turrell Retrospective =

2013 video game

Bubsy 3D
- Developer: Arcane Kids
- Publisher: Arcane Kids
- Designers: Ben Esposito (levels), Jacob Knipfing, Russell Honor
- Artist: Ben Esposito
- Writer: Ben Esposito
- Composer: Ben Esposito
- Engine: Unity
- Platforms: Windows, Macintosh
- Release: October 4, 2013
- Genres: Platform, art
- Mode: Single-player

Bubsy 3D: Bubsy Visits the James Turrell Retrospective is a downloadable 3D platform video game developed and published by indie game developer Arcane Kids. Touted as an educational experience, it is a facetious spiritual successor to Bubsy 3D, an entry from the Bubsy series of video games, and was created as a tribute to the game for the Bubsy franchise's 20th anniversary. The game follows Bubsy Bobcat as he travels through a nightmarish scenario upon visiting the real-life retrospective tribute of postmodern artist James Turrell. It was released in autumn 2013 – shortly after the domain name for Bubsy 3D's official website had expired. In 2017, in addition to making a downloadable version of the game available due to the fading support of the browser version of Unity, a remastered version of the game was made available with high-definition graphics and a new epilogue following Bubsy reminiscing over the events of the game and meeting his older self.

== Gameplay ==
In-game screenshot of Bubsy being advised by a talking frog to visit the art museum

Bubsy 3D is highly derivative of Bubsy 3D, a 1996 platform game for the PlayStation, with a primitive graphical style overtly meant to mimic the low-polygon visuals of its respective inspirer. The player controls Bubsy, an orange bobcat, as he explores and progresses through several platforming levels. Controls are made to simulate those of Bubsy 3D's, which have gained infamy for being considered by many as poorly-implemented; Bubsy is able to walk and jump, and can glide in order to fall more slowly and travel long distances mid-air. Several collectibles are scattered throughout the game, of which have no effect on gameplay. The player can also enter various cheat codes from the game's title screen.

== Plot ==
The game follows Bubsy as he goes through an out-of-body experience at the James Turrell retrospective exhibit at the Los Angeles County Museum of Art. After visiting the museum and appreciating Turrell's light-based artworks, Bubsy comes across the exhibit "St. Elmo's Breath". He enters the exhibit, having heard it to be a "spiritual experience", and enters a coffin which brings him into the afterlife, where he becomes a fully-grown adult, which is a humanoid with a face that looks similar to Jason Alexander. Surrounded by dancing human skeletons urging him to give in to the pressures of capitalism, Bubsy enters the flames of hell, repeating the phrase "No object. No form. No relief. No salvation." before being taken to the deserted parking lot of an Applebee's restaurant. When trying to enter the restaurant, the building is destroyed to reveal the word "art", as the screen zooms in and ends the game.

In an epilogue chapter that added to the game in a 2017 update, Bubsy reflects on his career as an artist years after the events of the first part of the game, while viewing an exhibition about himself and the first part of the game. Bubsy goes on to perform at the exhibition where he eats appetizers at an Applebee's restaurant with the adult version of himself. Afterward Bubsy goes to see Michael Heizer's new installation of Levitated Mass outside the museum which he views negatively and is driving him crazy. After finding it, Bubsy finds a hole on the side of the rock in Levitated Mass and enters it which sends him inside the piece where he becomes a "true artist" alongside Michelangelo, Rembrandt, William Shakespeare and Pink Floyd, and turns into a statue. However, his statue is immediately destroyed by his adult self who earlier told Bubsy to not trust anyone in the piece (which Bubsy ignores), which angers mirror images of Bubsy in the room where Bubsy turned into the statue and causes the mirrors to break. The adult version of Bubsy resurrects the real Bubsy and they both fight off waves of Bubsy statues coming through the broken mirrors using guns, swords and rockets as the camera pans away and fades to black. A message is then displayed stating "There is no relief in art Bubsy chooses humanity."

== Background ==
Bubsy 3D was developed and published by Arcane Kids, an independent game developer dedicated to releasing joke video games. It was released in 2013 to commemorate the 18th birthday of the original Bubsy 3D. The game's official website touts itself as an "edutainment experience", asking players to "explore [their] relationship with art" and jokingly urging them to visit a local art museum and fully quit from playing video games after completing the game and further expanding their understanding of art. According to Ben Esposito, a designer at Arcane Kids, the game was meant to use the infamy of the original PlayStation title as "a smokescreen for talking about art," musing that it could get people to consider the concept of art by presenting it in the form of a "poorly executed edutainment".

== Reception ==
PC Gamer listed Bubsy 3D as one of the best free online Windows games, calling it a "weird art-platformer." Steven Universe creator Rebecca Sugar has expressed appreciation for the game, praising it for "using this ridiculous pop culture nostalgia to force someone to experience art." Josh Fairhurst of Limited Run Games noted that the company had discussions about including the fan game in some capacity in Bubsy in: The Purrfect Collection (2025); while this never came to fruition, the compilation does contain a reference to the parody game.
