= Endless Fantasy =

Studio album by Anamanaguchi
- Released: May 14, 2013
- Studio: Carriage House, Stratosphere Sound, Shout It Out, Loud Studios, Swan 7 and band members bedrooms
- Genre: Chiptune; synth-pop; power pop; indie rock
- Length: 76:10
- Label: dream.hax, Alcopop!
- Producer: Gabe Liberti; Anamanaguchi; Kurt Feldman; Ashley Eskrett; Jonathan Baken; Eric W. Brown

Anamanaguchi chronology
Single + Remix Collections (2012)	Endless Fantasy (2013)	Capsule Silence XXIV (Original Soundtrack Vol I) (2016)

Singles from Endless Fantasy
- 1. "Meow" Released: January 8, 2013; 2. "Endless Fantasy" Released: May 24, 2013; 3. "Prom Night" Released: January 30, 2014

Professional ratings
Review scores
Source	Rating
AllMusic	4/5 stars

Endless Fantasy is the second studio album by American chiptune-based pop and rock band Anamanaguchi released on May 14, 2013, in the US through the band's own dream.hax record label and on September 30, 2013, in the UK by Alcopop! Records.

On May 3, 2013, Anamanaguchi provided a Kickstarter project for the album. In just 11 hours, their funding goal of $50,000 was reached. At the end of its run, the project was backed by 7,253 people who contributed to raising a grand total of $277,399, making it the second most successful music project to be funded on Kickstarter at the time, behind that of singer Amanda Palmer.

On May 23, 2013, the album debuted at No. 1 on Billboard's Heatseekers Albums chart as well as No. 2 in Dance/Electronic Albums.

== Track listing ==
All songs were written and composed by Peter Berkman and Ary Warnaar except where noted.

Endless Fantasy track listing
No.	Title	Length
1.	"Endless Fantasy"	5:58
2.	"Japan Air" (featuring m33sh)	4:23
3.	"Echobo"	3:13
4.	"Planet"	4:19
5.	"Viridian Genesis" (featuring Eimear O'Donovan)	3:02
6.	"John Hughes"	3:26
7.	"Prom Night" (featuring Bianca Raquel)	3:48
8.	"Interlude (Gymnopedie No. 1)" (Erik Satie)	1:09
9.	"Akira"	3:31
10.	"SPF 420"	2:06
11.	"Interlude (Total Tea Time)" (Luke Silas)	0:59
12.	"Meow"	3:31
13.	"Canal Paradise"	4:34
14.	"Snow Angels"	4:38
15.	"In the Basement"	3:30
16.	"U n Me"	4:51
17.	"Space Wax America"	3:48
18.	"Everything Explodes"	2:43
19.	"Interlude (Still 'Splodin' Tho)"	1:06
20.	"Pastel Flags"	3:21
21.	"Bosozoku GF"	4:48
22.	"(T-T)b"	3:35

== Charts ==
Chart performance for Endless Fantasy
Chart (2013)	Peak position
US Heatseekers Albums (Billboard)	1
US Independent Albums (Billboard)	21
US Top Album Sales (Billboard)	102
US Top Alternative Albums (Billboard)	20
US Top Dance Albums (Billboard)	2
US Top Rock Albums (Billboard)	30
US Vinyl Albums (Billboard)	8
