= List of Scott Pilgrim characters =

Comics characters

This article is a list of fictional characters in the comic book series Scott Pilgrim by Bryan Lee O'Malley, its film adaptation Scott Pilgrim vs. the World, its 2 video game adaptations Scott Pilgrim vs. the World: The Game, Scott Pilgrim EX, and its animated series Scott Pilgrim Takes Off.

== Overview ==
For the film versions of the characters, O'Malley sent crib sheets that explained the backstory, character motivations, and events in the book to Michael Bacall and Edgar Wright. Bacall then created a list of "ten secret things" for each character, according to O'Malley, for fun, and many of the entries were jokes: O'Malley said that the "ten secret things" documents were not intended to be taken seriously as character background.

O'Malley created a height chart for the characters, printed in volume 1, but said "it's not really canon, and I never did one again, and the heights were always very inconsistent." With the exception of five of the characters, O'Malley said that the heights were "always kinda vague. I didn't pay enough attention to it." O'Malley said that during the development of the book, "the hair colours in the book barely crossed my mind (I just used whatever colour seemed nice at the time if I was colouring a cover or illustration). There were no 'canon' hair colours in my mind."

== Main characters ==
=== Scott Pilgrim ===
Scott Pilgrim
- Book dust jacket to Scott Pilgrim's Precious Little Life. Art by Bryan Lee O'Malley.

Publication information
- Publisher: Oni Press
- First appearance: Scott Pilgrim's Precious Little Life (2004)
- Created by: Bryan Lee O'Malley

In-story information
- Full name: Scott William Pilgrim
- Abilities: Video game-based fighting skills; graphic novel-based agility and speed; control over Subspace and the Glow; owner of the Power of Understanding

Scott William Pilgrim is the 23-year-old (22 in film and 24 in volumes 5–6) titular protagonist. He is the bass player for the band Sex Bob-Omb with his friends Stephen Stills and Kim Pine; he plays a Rickenbacker 4001C64 (4003 in the film). Though initially unemployed, he later gets a job as a dish washer and food prep trainee at The Happy Avocado vegetarian restaurant. The character's name was inspired by the song "Scott Pilgrim" from Plumtree's 1998 album Predicts the Future. He believes that smoking is evil, drinks "only on occasions", and doesn't hit girls. Scott seems to suffer from memory problems, which his friends assume that he has because of his stupidity. However, the real reason is that Gideon Gordon Graves, the leader of the league of evil exes, has manipulated his memories to the extent that he forgets (or misremembers) important events in his life. Less important events, such as one of his jobs at a Mexican food restaurant, stay the same. He is consistently portrayed as being stupid- to the extent that his mind is quite literally a barren desert- but sometimes has brief moments of clarity, such as distracting Matthew Patel by not rhyming properly (providing an opening for Scott to attack), causing Lucas Lee to combust by making him skateboard down the Casa Loma stairs at extremely fast speeds, and tricking Todd Ingram into consuming half-and-half (in the movie). He often wears a Smashing Pumpkins shirt with the letters “SP” on it, his initials, and has a parka which features the X-men logo on a patch, which Scott presumably sewed in himself.

Scott Pilgrim was ranked as the 85th-greatest comic book character of all time by Wizard magazine. Empire magazine ranked Scott Pilgrim as the 40th-greatest comic book character stating that Scott "is one of the most authentic twenty-somethings ever committed to comic book paper." IGN ranked Scott Pilgrim the 69th-greatest comic book hero of all time, stating that they love Scott not just because he is a tried-and-true nerd who battles villains in epic fashion, but because he went through a dramatic character arc over the course of his series.

O'Malley said that Scott was not based on any one person, though referring to a friend he said "[he] is the only guy who has any claim to inspiration for Scott, and it's purely visual—the personality is all fiction." Gabrielle Drolet of the UWO Gazette stated that Scott "started off as an embellished version of Bryan" before being fleshed out.

O'Malley said that Scott is "a little taller than Ramona".

Other media

Scott is played by Michael Cera in the film Scott Pilgrim vs. the World. Shortly before filming began, Cera received a list of secrets (some of which are already in the books, some of which are neither in the books nor the film) about the character. Cera said: "The one that really stays in my head is that Scott, in his mind, is the star of his own movie. This movie is, in a way, existing in his own mind. This is his weird perception of the world around him."

Cera also voices Scott for the animated short Scott Pilgrim vs. The Animation, and reprises his role in the 2023 anime series Scott Pilgrim Takes Off. Takes Off also features Finn Wolfhard voicing a teenage Scott, and Will Forte voicing an older Scott in his mid-30s. It is revealed that in the future, Scott and Ramona eventually separate, and the 37-year-old Scott takes it poorly and kidnaps his 23-year-old self from the past to convince him not to date Ramona. When his plan fails, Scott loses more of his sanity and spends 10 years training before going back in time once more to try and destroy Ramona, the Evil Exes, and his past self.

=== Ramona Flowers ===
Ramona Victoria "Rammy" Flowers is an American expatriate from New York, a "ninja delivery girl" for Amazon and Scott's main love interest. Her age is unknown until the end of the 4th volume, where she reveals that she is 24 years old. She reveals very little and is very guarded about her past in New York City before she moved to Toronto. She is capable of traveling through subspace and has seven evil exes who challenge Scott for her affection. She changes her hairstyle every three weeks and becomes anxious when Gideon is mentioned or brought up. Her head glows periodically, usually when she is upset, jealous, or heartbroken (this is revealed to be the work of Gideon who has zapped Ramona with "the glow", a psychological weapon that locks the target in their own head with nothing but their emotional baggage), though she herself is unaware of this until Kim Pine brings attention to it in volume 5.

When asked if Ramona is supposed to be fat or plump, O'Malley responded by stating that "since it is a comic book and I draw everyone kinda cartoony and rounded, I figure it's up to the reader to decide. However, I must inform you that Knives was mainly being mean when she said Ramona was fat." Her natural hair colour is not stated. O'Malley said "Nobody knows her natural hair color. Ramona may not even remember. She changes it a lot because she's trying to figure out who she is / who she wants to be." On another occasion, when asked, O'Malley said "I don't know... brown? How many natural hair colors are there really? She isn't blonde. Honestly, I never thought about it... her hair color didn't matter to me. Because I was drawing a black and white comic. Her hair color is whatever u [sic] desire~." For the new colour editions of volume 2 he kept Ramona's hair as purple, reserving the blue colour spectrum for Ramona's hair for volume 4 and onwards. O'Malley said that if Ramona hypothetically broke up with Scott after volume 6, she would change her hair to a chin-length, "messy" bob with bangs that is dyed black and chopped: O'Malley explained that he never used this hairstyle for Ramona because it is too similar to the shape of Kim Pine's hairstyle. In terms of Ramona's height, O'Malley said that it was "supposed to be tallish" meaning around 5 feet 8 inches (1.73 m) or 5 feet 9 inches (1.75 m). Ramona's subspace bag, like her hair, changes colour periodically. Throughout her dating history, Ramona had one "non-evil" ex, Doug, who O'Malley named after one of his real life friends.

Ramona Flowers was ranked 70th in Comics Buyer's Guide's "100 Sexiest Women in Comics" list.

Other media

Ramona is played by Mary Elizabeth Winstead in the film Scott Pilgrim vs. the World, and reprises her role in the 2023 anime series Scott Pilgrim Takes Off.

O'Malley stated that some audience members perceived film Ramona as being "a colder character in the movie", and that a possible contributing factor was that the film was originally written and filmed with an ending involving Scott returning to Knives instead of moving on with Ramona. Shortly before filming began, Winstead received the list of facts about Ramona's past. When asked what those facts are, she responded, "I honestly don't know if they are things that Bryan would want out there, so I'll keep them quiet. But things about her family-she's kind of a tragic figure in a way. She's been through a lot, and that's why she's so guarded and mysterious." Winstead has since revealed at least one of the secrets, one that she considered very insightful for her character: Ramona's younger brother died when she was younger and she wears one of his shoelaces around her neck in memory of him. According to O'Malley, the particular detail about the brother is not applicable in the book version of Ramona. After Winstead learned she had the part, she began training to be the character in Los Angeles. The training included stunt training, pushups and fight training. Winstead said that the training was "pretty cool" and "like being in some sort of kung fu camp."

=== Wallace Wells ===
Wallace Wells is Scott's "cool gay roommate". He is 25 years old and first met Scott in college; he consistently attempted to talk to Scott, with Scott eventually relenting and becoming friends with him. At some point, they were both drunk and headed to Scott's place. Wallace has more intellectual properties, and is more responsible and mature than Scott: he holds down a job and pays for most of their expenses during their time together as roommates. Most of their apartment's furniture and possessions belong to Wallace and he buys the majority of their groceries. Wallace serves as Scott's mentor during his trials, assisting Scott with training for his fights against Ramona's exes and gathering intel on them. It is implied that he trained Scott in his fighting style, as Scott calls him a terrible master. He dates and later moves in with his "psychic" boyfriend, Mobile. The character was inspired by O'Malley's former roommate Christopher Butcher.

Other media

Wallace is played by Kieran Culkin in the film Scott Pilgrim vs. the World, and reprises his role in the 2023 anime series Scott Pilgrim Takes Off.

=== Knives Chau ===
Knives Chau is a 17-year-old Chinese-Canadian high-school girl and self-described "Scott-aholic". Scott dates her for a short while, but breaks up with her after he meets Ramona (though he initially "forgets" to break up with her). Initially a quiet, typical schoolgirl, after their break-up, she cuts and dyes her hair and changes her clothing style, hoping to win Scott back by becoming more of a hipster. Her discovery that Scott was cheating on her with Ramona causes tension between the two girls, sometimes culminating in actual fights, though later the two reach a level of mutual acceptance. She starts dating Sex Bob-Omb's groupie Young Neil, although she is still in love with Scott. She and Neil later break up, but Knives still hangs out with the group. She initially idolizes Envy Adams, based on her success as a musician and her former relationship with Scott, but is soon disenchanted when Envy has her drummer Lynette Guycott punch Knives hard enough to knock the highlights out of her hair. Knives' father becomes aware of Scott's past relationship with his daughter, causing him to hunt Scott down and try to kill him, though Scott later earns his acceptance. Knives becomes aware of her father's plot when Scott tries to hide in the Second Cup, where Knives is newly employed. In Vol. 6, Knives turns 18 and goes off to university. Scott and Knives reconcile and remain friends.

O'Malley used St. Michael's College School as the school Knives attends: in real life it is an all-boys school. O'Malley described her height as "short."

Other media

Knives is played by Ellen Wong in the film Scott Pilgrim vs. the World. When an interviewer from GQ said "As a character, Knives can be a little bit...annoying," Wong responded, "Put yourself in her shoes! She's a capricious young girl. At that age, you don't know what you want or where you fit in in life." When the interviewer responded with "But she's obsessed with Scott Pilgrim. She's pathological," Wong responded with "I wouldn't say she's obsessed. This is her first time being in love with somebody. She's feeling new emotions." Wong added that Knives begins as an "unblemished teenager" who was sheltered and discovers new aspects of life with Scott, and she adds that "[a]nd then Scott breaks up with her and she's forced to go back to her old life? No, she can't go back now! No, not after she's seen what exists out there, so she kind of fights for that and she wants to keep going, she's just passionate, she's determined, not annoying!"

Wong said that when she first auditioned for the role, she did not know who Knives was. She liked playing as Knives in that audition, so she bought the books and read them. Wong said that she "loved how free-spirited she was in the beginning phases—she genuinely wants to have a good time. Then I got the books and found out she's this bad-ass ninja too [laughs] it just kept getting better."

An interviewer told Wong that "More than anyone else in the film, Knives really goes on the most complex journey emotionally." Responding to that, Wong said that she enjoyed "figuring out her arc—showing her growth is definitely key to her story. It really is the story of a young girl figuring out where she fits in the world. A lot of the things she encounters in this movie have to do with it being 'the first time' she's dealt with it. I feel like the other characters have all gone through their Knives phase already—it's kind of refreshing to see somebody young and untainted. She brings a fresh perspective to the movie." She added that she preferred the final cut ending versus the alternate ending where Knives and Scott become a couple, saying that it "adds to her character." Wong further explained, "But what's great about both endings is that it remains unclear if Scott is in a dating relationship with Knives or Ramona. It's nice to leave that open because it's like life. You don't always get closure with concrete answers—anything can happen and you just have to move on."

As part of the film, Wong said that the "wire work" was "fun. It's like flying!" When the interviewer mentioned that he heard many complaints about the wires causing pain, Wong stated "It hurts more for the guys..."

Wong reprises her role in the 2023 anime series Scott Pilgrim Takes Off, becoming a member of Sex Bob-Omb in Scott's absence and writing a musical with Stephen based on Young Neil's screenplay.

=== Stephen Stills ===
Stephen Stills is the lead singer, guitarist and "talent" of Sex Bob-Omb. He is 22 years old and went to university with Scott. He is employed at The Happy Avocado vegetarian restaurant as a cook and later helps Scott get a job there as a dishwasher. Stephen is in a tumultuous relationship with Julie Powers, who at one point suspects that he and Knives may have a mutual attraction to one another. Whilst typically laconic, Stephen is known for rare fits of neurosis, typically over the quality—or lack thereof—of his band's music, as well as irritability, usually over Scott's absentmindedness. By the end of the series, Stephen reveals to Scott that he and Joseph are in a relationship and that he came out to the rest of their friends in volume 5 after realizing that he is gay, causing Scott to ask "Julie turned you gay?" Stephen claims that he did not tell Scott because he seemed to have a lot going on with his life. He shares a name with Stephen Stills of Crosby, Stills, Nash & Young. Scott always refers to him by his full name.

Other media

Stephen Stills is played by Mark Webber in the film Scott Pilgrim vs. the World. Prior to this role, Webber had neither sung professionally nor played the guitar, but learned both in the weeks preceding filming. O'Malley said that the film version of Stephen Stills is a closeted gay man (though his sexuality is never brought up in the film). O'Malley also said that Stephen Stills "maybe doesn't fully understand himself yet." Webber reprises his role in the 2023 anime series Scott Pilgrim Takes Off, writing a musical with Knives based on Young Neil's screenplay.

=== Kim Pine ===
Kimberly "Kim" Pine is Scott's high school friend and drummer of Sex Bob-Omb. She is 23 years old and was Scott's first girlfriend, whom he "saved" from Simon Lee. The two broke up when Scott's family moved away to Toronto. She has a sarcastic personality and dislikes many people. Kim is employed at No-Account Video throughout the series. Her relationship with Scott is typically one of annoyance at his ineptitude, but volume 5 strongly hints that she is still in love with him, but has become resigned to the fact that he loves Ramona. She later moves back home to Northern Ontario at the end of volume 5, prompting Scott to apologize ambiguously for his actions: she accepts the apology before boarding the bus. She later contacts Scott to have him relieve her of boredom at her parents' place. While he visits, Kim helps Scott remember the reality of his past relationships and accept that he did things as a bad boyfriend that he did not want to accept about himself. With Kim, it is revealed that he never told her he was moving away. She had to confront him after finding out from their mutual friend, Lisa Miller. During Scott's final fight with Gideon, she is psychically aware of the events taking place, despite being at her parents' home. She later forms another band with Scott.

O'Malley came up with the name "Kim Pine" when he was in high school, first used it for a character in the short-lived comic strip "Style" before using it for the Scott Pilgrim series. After viewing the Scott Pilgrim page on TV Tropes, a website that catalogs patterns in media, and seeing a section that suggested Kim Pine was ugly, O'Malley explained that Kim Pine is not necessarily less attractive than other characters, but that she believes she is less attractive than other characters and therefore "is insecure and/or uncomfortable with her looks". O'Malley explained that "Kim says Envy is pretty and looks bummed and clearly thinks Envy is prettier than her. But Envy is on the cover of a magazine, she's a rock star, she's wearing tons of makeup and she's been professionally styled and photoshopped. Plus Scott dated her after Kim and it's confusing. There's more to it than 'Envy is pretty! Kim is ugly so she's sad!'"

In terms of Kim's height, O'Malley said that it was "medium".

Other media

Kim is played by Alison Pill in the film Scott Pilgrim vs. the World; Pill also voices Kim for the animated short Scott Pilgrim vs. The Animation, and reprises her role in the 2023 anime series Scott Pilgrim Takes Off. Pill said that the film Kim "cares more about Sex Bob-Omb than she lets on" and that she "cares more about Scott than she lets on." She added that Kim does feel some bitterness about the result of the romance between Scott and herself. Pill learned to play the drums for the role and performs on the soundtrack.

=== Young Neil ===
Neil "Young Neil" Nordegraf is Sex Bob-Omb's biggest fan. He briefly dates Knives Chau, until she breaks up with him. Knives admits in volume 3 to only dating him because he looks so similar to Scott. In volume 5, he becomes angry at how isolated he has become from his friends and later becomes bitter and sullen, taking up smoking. He is the quietest character and is very apathetic to almost everything. He is described as "The young one, at least until Knives showed up". When called an "asshole", he says "I'm young, I'll grow out of it". In volume 6, Scott introduces him for the first time as simply "Neil", which is described as the best day of his (Neil's) life. The dust jacket front fold-over sleeve of volume 5 calls him a "hanger on" and the author himself says that Young Neil is written as dopey because his eyes are covered by his hair. It was easier to write Neil as dopey than to portray him differently given his lack of eyebrows. His nickname is a reversal of Neil Young, a frequent collaborator of musician Stephen Stills.

Regarding his hair colour, when a Tumblr user asked O'Malley why the character's hair colour was "light brown-nearly blond" in the colour section of Scott Pilgrim Gets it Together but in the new colour editions had a brown colour that is darker than Scott's colour, O'Malley replied saying that "the reason is that I don't care what color Young Neil's hair is. (laughs) Who's Young Neil even?"

His sister, Stephanie "Steph" Nordegraf played bongos and the viola in Scott's old band, Kid Chameleon.

Stephanie was a roommate of Stephen Stills while they attended university. After Stephanie moved out to pursue further education, Neil moved in and became a part of Stephen Stills's social circle. O'Malley said "That's about as far as I thought it through. It was really just an explanation for why they'd have a younger friend, and this sister/roommate setup was based on an IRL ["in real life"] friend."

Other media

Young Neil is played by Johnny Simmons in the film Scott Pilgrim vs. the World. In the film, he replaces Scott as the bass for Sex Bob-Omb when Scott refuses to play for Gideon's theater. Simmons reprises his role in the 2023 anime series Scott Pilgrim Takes Off, becoming a professional screenwriter after a time-traveling future Ramona writes a screenplay based on the original timeline under his name.

== Supporting characters ==
=== Envy Adams ===
Natalie V. "Envy" Adams is Scott's ex-girlfriend who devastates Scott by breaking up with him in college previous to the events of the book. Initially a quiet, mousey girl, she decides to change herself and her image, becoming more callous and aggressive, eventually taking over Scott's band and dumping him. She later reappears, introduced in the series as the lead singer and keyboardist for the popular emerging band "the Clash At Demonhead". Scott describes her original personality as being "nice" and does not understand what she has since become. Envy was in a relationship with Ramona's ex-boyfriend Todd Ingram and claims to know about Ramona's past. She later begins a relationship with Gideon, who helps promote her new solo album in Chaos Theatre. She tries to help Scott remember the real reason for why they broke up (an argument he started with her that night) and prepare for the fight with Gideon. Despite Gideon supporting her career, Envy is dissatisfied with his lack of true affection for her. Gideon later reveals he has no true interest in her. After his defeat, Envy reconciles with Scott.

O'Malley drew inspiration for Envy from several sources, including the "character" of Metric frontwoman Emily Haines as a performer. O'Malley used images of Haines as references for drawings of Envy in volume 3. He stated that he did not entirely base Envy on Haines. He stated that he does not personally know Haines and is not aware of what her personality is like and so Envy's personality did not originate from Haines. O'Malley stated that the inspiration for her hairstyle is from Asuka Langley Soryu.

Other media

Envy is played by Brie Larson in the film Scott Pilgrim vs. the World. In the film, Envy does not have a relationship with Gideon, and she was originally intended to replace Ramona's fourth Evil-Ex, Roxie (Roxy in the film). In the film, Envy has blond hair instead of red hair. Edgar Wright originally read the volumes unbound, so he did not see the colour covers until later. He envisioned Envy being blonde. When discussing Envy with O'Malley, he identified her as a blonde. O'Malley said that while he had coloured her hair red at one time, the character may have a good appearance with blonde hair. During initial costume tests, the red wig was applied, but O'Malley said "nobody was super into it." During the blond hair test, "obviously we all loved it." O'Malley said that therefore, "we all liked the platinum blonde better on Brie, so we went with that." O'Malley added that, "Anyway, her hair in the movie is clearly bleach-blonde, so you can imagine for yourself that Envy was a redhead in college and dyed it for her big rock star makeover." For the coloured versions of the comic books, O'Malley continued giving Envy red hair because "red on a cartoon character just has a completely different look and feel." Larson reprises her role in the 2023 anime series Scott Pilgrim Takes Off, where she plays Ramona in the in-universe film Scott Pilgrim's Precious Little Life before the film is shut down, and rejects Todd after he falls in love with Wallace.

In a draft script, her middle name is "Veronica."

=== Stacey Pilgrim ===
Stacey Pilgrim is Scott's 18-year-old younger sister, who is much more mature than Scott. She works at the same Second Cup as Julie Powers and is also friends with Ramona. She receives a fair amount of gossip from Wallace, though is generally annoyed at him for stealing away all of her boyfriends. Stacey is based on O'Malley's sister, who has the name Stacey. When O'Malley was asked retrospectively which character he would remove if he could choose one, he said that it would be Stacey and he explained that he "kind of did remove her as the story went on... you'll notice that she's barely in the books at all after the first few volumes. I just felt weird about putting my sister out there in the world as the books got more popular. So anyway, I probably would have changed Scott's sister's name or something, if I was smarter. I'm dumb."

Other media

Stacey is played by Anna Kendrick in the film Scott Pilgrim vs. the World, and reprises her role in the 2023 anime series Scott Pilgrim Takes Off.

=== Julie Powers ===
Julie Powers is Stephen Stills' 22-year-old ex-girlfriend. She attended the same college that Stephen and Scott did. She was roommates with Envy before Scott began dating her. Despite hating her in college, she tries (unsuccessfully) to get back in Envy's good graces once she has become famous. She was also friends with Ramona before she and Scott began dating. She tries to keep Scott away from Ramona, stating that she believes him to be a loser. Her character is described as "ass and obnoxious" and she frequently fights/argues with other characters, even befriending two of Ramona's evil exes as they attempt to fight Scott. At one point, she suspects that Stephen and Knives may have a mutual attraction, causing her to react toward Knives with hostility. During volume 5 she begins holding regular themed parties at her loft apartment, with themes ranging from Halloween, "Underwater pimp and hoe, Canadian politics circa 1972 but you're secretly Batman", as well as a Day of the Dead party. A recurring gag is that she is constantly breaking up and getting back together with Stephen Stills, who eventually breaks up with her for good with Joseph.

Julie is played by Aubrey Plaza in the film Scott Pilgrim vs. the World. Plaza received the list of ten secret facts about Julie the night before filming started. Plaza has since revealed at least two of the facts and has said that "some of them were weird" and "kind of silly": first, she is allergic to either cauliflower or penicillin depending on the interview, possibly both (she also implies in one of the interviews that the penicillin allergy may have been a plot point for a scene (or scenes) in the movie that ended up being cut out later). Second, as she put it, "...one of my secret facts was that Julie had a massive crush on Scott Pilgrim in college, and he never liked her. So that was helpful, 'cause I was like, no wonder she hates him." Plaza expands on this point in another interview, saying "...he had little flings and crushes on all of her friends but never really paid attention to her so that really bugs her." According to O'Malley, the plot point about Scott dating all of the other characters around Julie Powers was created by itself, and that it was not present in the original work. Plaza reprises her role in the 2023 anime series Scott Pilgrim Takes Off, in which she is sought out by Gideon, whom she knew in high school as "Gordon Goose", and develops a relationship with him due to finding his evil ambition attractive.

=== League of Evil Exes ===
The League of Evil Exes was founded when Ramona left Gideon for Toronto. When he finds her six other exes online, he manipulates them into believing that Ramona was responsible for their break-ups. He uses their anger to mold them in the image of evil. They believe this to be a plan to get revenge on her, but Gideon's secret intention is to use Ramona's ability of subspace travel to manipulate the minds of everyone on Earth. The team was founded two weeks prior to the events of Vol. 1. Each time Scott defeats one of them they become (or drop) coins according to their place in the list in similar fashion to the enemies from the River City Ransom NES video game from the '80s.

==== Matthew Patel ====
Matthew Patel is Ramona's first evil ex, who dated her in seventh grade. According to Ramona, they only kissed once and broke up after about a week. Scott initially ignored Matthew's repeated challenges to fight him, leaving him confused when Patel arrived at the Rockit. He is Indo-Canadian, has mystical powers (flight and the ability to hurl fireballs) and can summon "Demon Hipster Chicks" at will. Scott gets $2.10 for defeating him.

Matthew is played by Satya Bhabha in the film Scott Pilgrim vs. the World, in which his fight scene resembles a Bollywood musical number. His demons are portrayed by stage actress Christine Watson. In the film, Ramona mentions that she liked that he was the only non-white, non-jock boy in school. Bhabha reprises his role in the 2023 anime series Scott Pilgrim Takes Off, in which he supposedly defeats Scott, gaining newfound confidence that leads him to challenge Gideon and take control of his business empire.

==== Lucas Lee ====
Luke "Lucas" Lee is Ramona's second evil ex, who dated her in their freshman year of high school before she cheated on him with Todd. In the present, he has become a pro skateboarder turned movie star (and a "sell out"). Scott gets $14 in coins and a mithril skateboard (that he cannot use since he lacks a skateboarding proficiency) after "defeating" him by tricking him into attempting a dangerous skateboard trick. He is named after pro skateboarder-turned-actor Jason Lee. A recurring gag is that Scott is frequently mistaking Lucas for Luke Wilson.

Lucas is played by Chris Evans in the film Scott Pilgrim vs. the World, where he battles Scott prior to his fatal skateboard trick using a gang of stunt doubles. Chris Evans described Lucas as "a bit of a jerk, a little full of himself, not the best actor in the world." Evans reprises his role in the 2023 anime series Scott Pilgrim Takes Off, in which his film career is jeopardized following a series of box-office bombs and scandals, and his real name is revealed to be "Luke", having lengthened the name for his Hollywood career.

==== Todd Ingram ====
Todd Ingram is Ramona's third evil ex, a bass player for the "Clash at Demonhead" band. He has special "vegan-based" psychic powers (although he is secretly consuming non-vegan foods), and his decision to go to a vegan college leads to him and Ramona breaking up after high school. He is arrogant, narcissistic, uncaring, also being a pathological liar. He dates Envy, his childhood love, but cheats on her repeatedly with Lynette, the band's drummer, as well as with other girls. He is caught by the Vegan Police for breaking his diet and has his powers taken away, giving the advantage to Scott. Scott gets some money (again in coins) plus an extra life when he defeats him. Todd is named after Scott Ingram, the real-life inspiration for the song "Scott Pilgrim".

Todd is played by Brandon Routh in the film Scott Pilgrim vs. the World. In the film, Todd is never shown to cheat on Envy, and Scott gets the Vegan Police to Todd by tricking him into drinking half and half. Routh reprises his role in the 2023 anime series Scott Pilgrim Takes Off, in which he discovers he is bisexual after having a brief affair with Wallace.

==== Roxie Richter ====
Roxanne "Roxie" Richter is Ramona's fourth evil ex (and the only female member in the League) and her former college roommate. She is a "half-ninja" (kunoichi) and an accomplished fine artist, who taught Ramona much of what she knows of her ninja abilities and subspace. Scott is usually against fighting girls (or anyone with a sword), so Ramona fights Roxie, for part of the time using Scott's body as a weapon. Roxie has an inferiority complex over her "half-ninja" background, as well as her figure - she is much shorter than Ramona. Despite her status as an evil ex, Roxie gets on well with Ramona but openly hates Scott, claiming Scott is a "lazy ass" who refuses to fight his own battles, prompting Scott to finally mature in his relationship with Ramona, gaining a sword and "The Power of Love" (a reference to a Huey Lewis song). The final fight scene between her and Scott is a reference to the beginning of Ninja Gaiden. When defeated by Scott, she explodes into a cascade of woodland creatures, a reference to Sonic the Hedgehog.

Roxie, spelled 'Roxy' in the film, is played by Mae Whitman, where she battles Ramona and Scott at a nightclub after-party (combining elements of Ramona and Envy's fight in Vol. 3 and the Winnifred Hailey fight in Free Scott Pilgrim). Scott barely defeats her by poking her "weak spot" on the back of her knee (causing her to explode into coins instead of woodland creatures), which was how Ramona defeated Envy in the comics. Whitman reprises her role in the 2023 anime series Scott Pilgrim Takes Off. She has a radically revamped design in the series, which includes a Yōkai mask, which was never present in the books or film. In the anime, it's revealed that Ramona's fear of confronting her past led her to emotionally neglect Roxie and eventually leave her without a goodbye, leaving Roxie bitter and heartbroken. However, Ramona acknowledges her wrongdoing and the two are able to reconcile as friends. By the end of the series, she is shown helping Todd train to get his vegan powers back.

==== The Katayanagi Twins ====
Kyle & Ken Katayanagi (Ken is referred to as "Kevin" in the video game) are Ramona's fifth and sixth evil exes, a pair of Japanese identical twins who often finish each other's sentences. While in college, Ramona dated them both simultaneously without the other knowing, in retaliation for their unwanted advances. They vowed to work together closely once the pair realized Ramona had been cheating on them with each other. The pair are "expert roboticists" who summon robots to fight Scott. The twins capture Kim Pine to lure Scott to them, pointing out in the meantime that Kim may still be in love with Scott. Scott defeats them and gets $79.95 for Ken, $74.95 for Kyle, as well as a $2 twins bonus (again all in coins) after defeating them both. He also unlocks an achievement for defeating them simultaneously (which is available in the video game).

Kyle and Ken are played by real-life brothers Shota and Keita Saito, respectively, in the film Scott Pilgrim vs. the World, where they are instead DJs who engage Sex Bob-Omb in a mystical amp battle during the semifinal round of the battle of the bands. They initially outclass Sex Bob-Omb by summoning "double dragon" animals from their amps, but are eventually defeated when Scott summons a Yeti by activating his distortion pedal. Since the Saito brothers did not speak English out-of-universe, their characters (who can speak English in-universe) did not speak in the movie at all. In the 2023 anime series Scott Pilgrim Takes Off, both twins are voiced by Japanese-American actor Julian Cihi, with their future selves developing a form of time travel using their Robot-01.

In the video game, Ken's name became Kevin in order to give a feel of a "looser" video game adaptation and to reference Double Dragon 3 where "Billy" was mis-introduced as "Bimmy."

==== Gideon Graves ====
Gideon Gordon Graves is the seventh evil ex, the series' main antagonist, the leader of the League of Ramona's Evil Exes, and Ramona's boyfriend previous to Scott in New York City. He is often seen wearing a white suit with a red dress shirt. He is mentioned several times throughout the series, but never seen fully until the end of volume 3. He is the owner of the "Chaos Theatre" (a nod reference to EarthBound), in NYC and "GGG Heavy Industries," which is opening "Chaos Theatre Toronto". Ramona has also "worked" for him previously in an unknown capacity. There is also a small cat living at Ramona's house by the same name, though the cat is revealed only to be named as such by Ramona as a way of dealing with the breakup. Gideon finally appears in the last volume as an inventor and club entrepreneur who is opening a new club, the Chaos Theatre, in Toronto. He begins a relationship with Envy, promoting her new solo album and setting her debut up as his club's opening act. During this time, he meets up with Scott, who flees instead of fighting him, though their altercation is unavoidably inevitable. He has apparent control over subspace, a side effect of his ability to induce "emotional warfare" via The Glow, which essentially traps people in their minds with their psychological issues. Using this allows him to literally be inside Ramona's head. He is also able to steal Scott's Power of Love katana sword and proves to be a competent swordsman. Upon his defeat, he showers $7,777,777 (once more, in coins) over the whole Chaos Theatre.

Gideon is played by Jason Schwartzman in the film Scott Pilgrim vs. the World, who also controls Ramona's head through the use of microchips. One of the ten secrets for Gideon was that "Gideon is very passive aggressive and so he's not overtly evil. He smiles a lot, just kind of 'kill 'em with kindness,' but you can feel that it's not sincere almost instantly." Schwartzman also stated that he really liked learning about this aspect of the character. He reprises his role in the 2023 anime series Scott Pilgrim Takes Off, which reveals Gideon to be an alias and his real name to be Gordon Goose. In the series, Gideon is defeated by Matthew, losing control of G-Man Media to him, so he moves in with Julie, whom he went to school with, and the two become romantically involved.

== Minor characters ==
=== Lynette Guycott ===
Lynette Guycott is the drummer for the "Clash at Demonhead" band. She once had a biomechanical arm (now severed). She can teleport and is presumably named after Plumtree's drummer Lynette Gillis and Tom Guycot from the video game of the same name. In the original book and in the video game, she has an affair with Todd Ingram, Envy's boyfriend. Lynette is played by Tennessee Thomas in the film Scott Pilgrim vs. the World. The film does not portray Lynette having an affair with Todd. In the book, Lynette punches Knives, but in the movie, Todd punches her instead.

=== Hollie Hawkes ===
Hollie Hawkes is Kim's 25-year-old co-worker and former roommate. She is described as nice, though she and Kim have a falling out after Kim learns that her boyfriend at the time, Jason Kim, cheated on her with Hollie. Regarding why Hollie cheated on Kim, O'Malley said "Kim lived with a bunch of people she hated, then moved in with someone she liked and ended up hating her too. We only see Kim's side of the story, but maybe I'm suggesting that Kim is part of the problem here. It kind of goes with the 'personal hero narrative' theme of the series. Kim is complicated." In Scott Pilgrim Takes Off, Hollie is voiced by Shannon Woodward.

=== Joseph ===
Joseph is Hollie and Kim's 24-year-old, soft-spoken (but abrasive) gay roommate who owns recording equipment. He has a crush on Todd Ingram and finds Stephen Stills attractive. This leads him to help Sex Bob-Omb record their album. By the end of the series, he and Stephen are revealed to be in a relationship together after Stephen realizes that he is gay and comes out.

=== The Boys!! And Crash!! ===
The Boys!! And Crash!! (formerly Crash And The Boys) is another local band composed of Luke "Crash" Wilson, the singer and guitarist, Joel MacMillan, the bass player, as well as Trisha "Trasha" Ha, the drummer. As with other bands in the story, they are named after a video game (Crash 'n the Boys: Street Challenge). After changing their name, the band learns an advanced technique which allows them to manipulate pure sound waves through hard work and willpower alone so that they no longer need to play instruments. They help Scott defeat Todd Ingram. In the film Scott Pilgrim vs. the World, Crash is played by Erik Knudsen, Joel is played by Maurie W. Kaufmann and Trasha is played by Abigail Chu. In the movie, however, Crash, Joel and Trisha are incinerated by a stray fireball in Scott's battle against Matthew Patel. The band is not a reference to The Locust or to any real life band.

=== Michael Comeau ===
Michael Comeau is a friend of Scott who, as stated by the books, "knows everybody (including you)." Based on Bryan Lee O'Malley's friend of the same name, a Toronto graphic artist. He has a ring which helps him identify people's names, which he claims to have obtained from the future itself. In the film Scott Pilgrim vs. the World, Comeau is played by Nelson Franklin.

=== Sandra ===
Sandra is a former classmate of Scott's and described as "kind of a ditz." In the film Scott Pilgrim vs. the World, Sandra is played by Kristina Pesic.

=== Monique ===
Monique is another ex-classmate of Scott's, described as "kind of a bitch." In the film Scott Pilgrim vs. the World, Monique is played by Ingrid Haas. Sandra and Monique were named after two classmates of O'Malley who attended middle school with him circa 1991-1992.

=== Sara ===
Sara is one of Kim Pine's unpleasant former roommates.

=== Simon Lee ===
Simon Lee is a figure from Scott's and Kim's past who used to date Kim and later kidnapped her. He resembles Gideon. However, it is revealed in volume 6 that this is only because Gideon was using subspace to alter Scott's memories and Simon Lee, in reality, looks nothing like Gideon. In the Scott Pilgrim vs. the Animation shorts, Simon is voiced by Jason Schwartzman.

=== Tamara Chen ===
Tamara Chen is Knives' 17-year-old best friend and typically a rational foil to Knives' crazy plans and ramblings. In the film Scott Pilgrim vs. the World, Tamara is played by Chantelle Chung.

=== Lisa Miller ===
Lisa Miller is an old high school friend of Scott and Kim's, as well as an actress in a Canadian soap opera, who is introduced in a flashback at the start of volume 2. She returns in volume 4, instigating one-sided sexual tension between her and Scott, causing Ramona to become jealous, despite Scott's ignorance of Lisa's advances. She and Scott later discuss why they never acted on their possible attractions to one another in high school and through their discussion, Scott comes to terms with his feelings of genuine love toward Ramona. Lisa then moves to California to further pursue her acting career and is given a big farewell dinner by the rest of the characters. In the Scott Pilgrim vs. the Animation shorts, Lisa is voiced by Mae Whitman. Like Kim Pine, the name Lisa Miller was first used by Bryan Lee O'Malley in his short-lived comic strip "Style". O'Malley created the idea of Whitman (who played Roxie in the movie) voicing Lisa in the animated short. In terms of Lisa's height, O'Malley said that it was "medium".

=== Other Scott ===
Scott is Wallace's gay best friend, who Scott Pilgrim calls "other Scott". His last name is unknown. In the film Scott Pilgrim vs. the World, "Other Scott" is rewritten as Wallace's boyfriend and is played by Ben Lewis.

=== Jimmy ===
Jimmy is Stacey's boyfriend, until Wallace seduces him. In the film Scott Pilgrim vs. the World, Jimmy is played by Kjartan Hewitt.

=== Mr. and Mrs. Pilgrim ===
Mr. and Mrs. Pilgrim are Scott's parents, featured in flashbacks in volume 2 and 3 and appear in the present in volume 5, helping Scott move into his new apartment. His father appears to spoil Scott, which his mother chastises. O'Malley has suggested that the character "Vincent" in the 2004 short comic "Monica Beetle" (which originally appeared in the "Project: Superior" anthology) might be Scott Pilgrim's dad having "Pilgrim"-esque adventures in 1974.

=== Lawrence West Pilgrim ===
Lawrence West Pilgrim is Scott's younger brother. He is first mentioned in volume 2 and appears in volume 5. He owns the bass guitar Scott uses. He has worn glasses since he was 14. Scott later gets confused and mistakes him (and everyone with glasses in the end of volume 5) for Gideon. His name is a reference to a subway stop in Toronto. His given name is "Lawrence West" and his family name is Pilgrim. O'Malley intended to make a "very different character" who had a significant role in the plot of volume 5. O'Malley decided that "I was getting too far away from the Scott/Ramona relationship, adding too many new characters, and I decided to re-focus the book on the core cast."

=== Jason Kim ===
Jason Kim is a friend of Kim's who owns a car and helps her move to her place with Hollie. Scott never remembers who he is, but apparently he and Kim were dating at some point. Jason eventually cheats on her with Hollie, which caused them to break-up.

=== Mr. Chau ===
Mr. Chau is Knives's father. He has a collection of antique samurai swords. His discovery that Knives had dated a white guy causes him to go on a rampage, hunting Scott down and attacking him with his samurai swords. Scott later gains his approval, prompting him to tell Knives that he will not mind if she dates another white guy in the future (his only spoken dialogue), but says it in Chinese, so consequently she does not understand. Mr. Chau appears in Scott Pilgrim vs. the World: The Game as an unlockable character that can be summoned to momentarily aid the player in combat. He is unlocked by encountering him on the overworld map and defeating him in combat.

=== Mobile ===
Mobile is Wallace's boyfriend. He and Wallace meet while dancing at a club and the two are revealed to have been dating since volume 3. He and Wallace move in together at the end of volume 4 and he makes his first appearance in volume 5. He is psychic and according to Wallace, he "attends business on the astral plane." He does not appear in the film (with Other Scott being rewritten as Wallace's boyfriend), but appears in Scott Pilgrim Takes Off, voiced by Cory Doran, during the epilogue scene in which Wallace meets him during a trip to Paris. However, he is not explicitly stated to be named Mobile, but physically resembles him. In the future, it's revealed he works at Nintendo and is Wallace's husband.

=== The Vegan Police ===
The Vegan Police are a group that appear briefly at the conclusion of volume 3, shown to have jurisdiction over the actions of psychic vegans. Two of their officers (one wiry and Caucasian, the other resembling Budai) appear out of nowhere during a protracted battle between Scott Pilgrim and Todd Ingram. As punishment for cheating on his vegan diet, they strip Todd of his powers, allowing Scott to finally defeat him. In the film Scott Pilgrim vs. the World, the two officers are played (uncredited) by Thomas Jane and Clifton Collins Jr., respectively. They vaguely resemble the Andys from Edgar Wright's Hot Fuzz.

=== NegaScott ===
NegaScott is the dark "negative" side of Scott, a reminder of all the mistakes Scott has made in the past. Scott had been running from it for so long, which is partly why his memories are a bit inaccurate. When Scott encounters NegaScott in volume 6, Kim reminds him to stop running from his mistakes. Upon remembering Ramona, Scott stops fighting it and merges with it, restoring his memory. NegaScott is played by Michael Cera in the film Scott Pilgrim vs. the World. In the movie adaptation Nega Scott (also portrayed by Michael Cera) is revealed to be the ultimate film boss and appears just as Scott defeats Gideon in similar fashion to the shadow clone final boss from the Double Dragon II kick and punch videogame from the '80s. However, Scott befriends Nega Scott instead of fighting with him since he found out that they both "had a lot in common", and part ways on good terms. This variant of the character is much more different than his comic portrayal, being used as a comedic element whereas in the comics he was one of the few non-comedic plot points. NegaScott is an unlockable character and boss of World 6 in Scott Pilgrim vs. the World: The Game.

=== Winifred Hailey ===
Winifred Hailey is a 16-year-old actress who was due to star in a movie with Lucas Lee before he was defeated by Scott Pilgrim. In Free Scott Pilgrim, several poster images of Winifred come to life, apparently due to some ninja magic. They attack Scott who, being afraid of hitting girls, forces Ramona to use him as a puppet to fight them. When they are defeated, they burst into several free beverage coupons. In the film Scott Pilgrim vs. the World, she briefly appears on the film set at Casa Loma. She is played by Emily Kassie. She is briefly mentioned in Scott Pilgrim Takes Off when Lucas Lee says he puked on her while they were both drunk at a movie premiere.

== Bands ==
The names of all the bands in Scott Pilgrim have thus far been references to video games.

- Sex Bob-Omb is Scott's band with Stephen Stills (vocals and guitar) and Kim Pine (drums). The name refers to Bob-omb, a sentient walking wind-up spherical mortar bomb character from the Super Mario series, and is a play on the term "sex bomb" and the punk band Sex Pistols. They are an average band, neither wildly popular nor terrible, though the banality of later recording their album results in the band hardly ever playing gigs or practicing and thus getting rusty. In the Scott Pilgrim vs. the World film, the music of Sex Bob-Omb is written by Beck.
- The Clash at Demonhead is the band of Scott's ex-girlfriend Envy. The name refers to the NES game Clash at Demonhead, as well as recalling the punk band the Clash. The band and the stage clothes of Envy were inspired by the band Metric which is also from Toronto, and in the film their music is performed by Metric.
- Sonic & Knuckles is Scott's first band, in high school with Kim Pine and Lisa Miller. It is named after the Sega Genesis game Sonic & Knuckles.
- Crash and the Boys is another local band, whose songs are short as 0.4 seconds long. Its name refers to an NES game, Crash 'n the Boys: Street Challenge, localized from the Japanese Kunio-kun series. They later rename themselves The Boys!! And Crash!! in volume 3, after a "coup d'etat". In the film, their music is performed by Broken Social Scene.
- Kid Chameleon is Scott's university band with Stephen Stills, Envy, as well as Young Neil's sister Stephanie, among others. It is named after the Sega Genesis game Kid Chameleon.
- Shatterband is a band made up of Scott Pilgrim (guitar and vocals) and Kim Pine (drums) at the end of volume 6. Much like in Sex Bob-Omb, Kim is shown shouting "We are Shatterband! ONE-TWO-THREE-FOUR!" at the beginning of their performance of "I'm a Believer". As it turns out, the only two people who could be their fans, Knives Chau and Young Neil, have "developed taste", so they decide to play exclusively to Ramona's cat, Gideon, instead. Before this band is formed, Scott offhandedly suggests the name for Stephen's new band, saying he had been "holding on to it for a while" (the fact that Scott and Kim use the name suggests that Stephen did not take it). This band is likely named after the NES game Shatterhand.
- Pop'n TwinBee is a band formed in the future depicted in Scott Pilgrim Takes Off and is named after the Super Famicom game Pop'n TwinBee. It refers to the members of the band, which are Old Scott Pilgrim and the Katayanagi Twins, who respawned after their defeat and are now friends with Old Scott. They posted a music video of themselves performing Konya Wa Hurricane from the anime Bubblegum Crisis in a video posted online. The video has 105 views.
