= Mizusawa =

Mizusawa may refer to:

- Mizusawa (surname)
- Mizusawa, Iwate, former city in Iwate Prefecture, Japan
- Mizusawa Domain, feudal domain in Mutsu Province, Japan
- Mizusawa Station, train station in Iwate, Japan
- 7530 Mizusawa, main-belt asteroid
