= Mae Whitman =

American actor (born 1988)

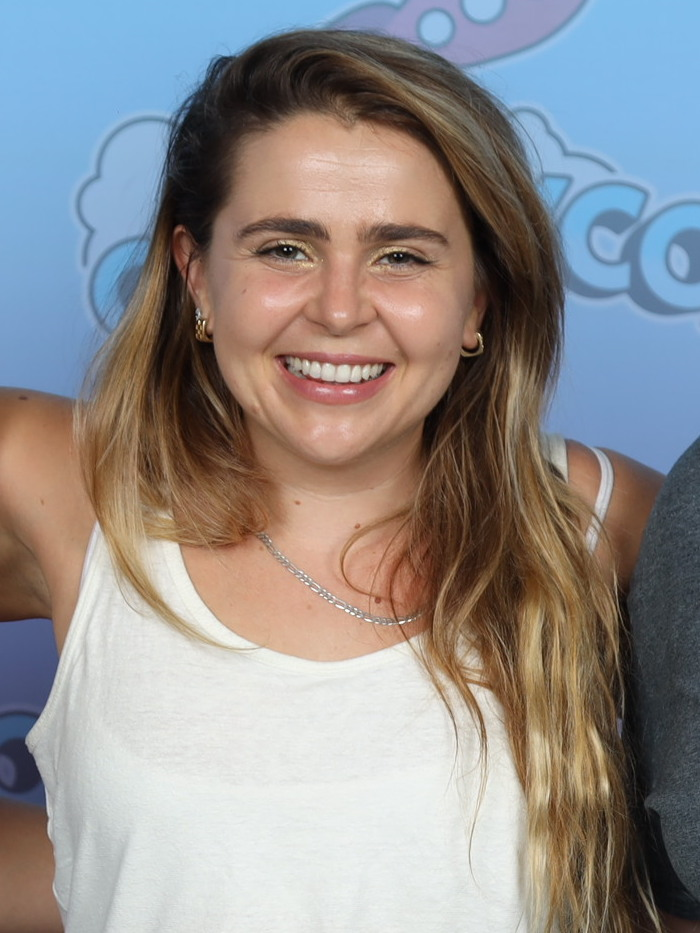
- Whitman in 2023
- Born: Mae Margaret Whitman; June 9, 1988 (age 38); Los Angeles, California, U.S.
- Education: Ribét Academy
- Occupation: Actor
- Years active: 1990–present
- Partner: Carlos Valdes (2023–present)
- Children: 1
- Parents: Jeff Whitman (father); Pat Musick (mother)

Mae Margaret Whitman (born June 9, 1988) is an American actor. She began her career as a child actor, starring in the films When a Man Loves a Woman (1994), One Fine Day (1996), Independence Day (1996), and Hope Floats (1998), and the television series Chicago Hope (1996–1999) and JAG (1998–2001). She earned mainstream recognition for her performances in the Fox sitcom Arrested Development (2004–2006, 2013), the NBC drama series Parenthood (2010–2015)—for which she was nominated for a Critics' Choice Television Award—and the NBC crime comedy series Good Girls (2018–2021). She also had roles in the films Scott Pilgrim vs. the World (2010), The Perks of Being a Wallflower (2012), and The DUFF (2015), the latter earning her a Teen Choice Award nomination.

Whitman has also worked as a voice actor in film and television, including Little Suzy in Johnny Bravo (1997–2004), Shanti in The Jungle Book 2 (2003), Katara in the Nickelodeon series Avatar: The Last Airbender (2005–2008), Rose / Huntsgirl in American Dragon: Jake Long (2005–2007), Tinker Bell in the eponymous film series (2008–2015), Cassie Sandsmark / Wonder Girl in Young Justice (2012–2022), April O'Neil in Teenage Mutant Ninja Turtles (2012–2017), Amity Blight in The Owl House (2020–2023), Annie in Skull Island (2023), and reprising her Scott Pilgrim role as Roxie Richter in Scott Pilgrim Takes Off (2023).

== Early life ==
Mae Margaret Whitman was born on June 9, 1988. in Los Angeles, California, United States, the only child of voice actress Pat Musick and personal manager and set construction coordinator Jeffrey Whitman. She attended Ribét Academy.

== Career ==
=== Early roles ===
Whitman started her career at age two in a voice-over for a Tyson Chicken commercial in 1990. Because she could not read, acting coach Andrew Magarian helped her memorize lines. At age five, Whitman made her film debut alongside Meg Ryan in When a Man Loves a Woman (1994), playing Ryan's youngest daughter, Casey Green. She was chosen for the role over 700 other girls who auditioned. In 1996, Whitman appeared in two films: Independence Day, playing Bill Pullman's daughter Patricia Whitmore, and One Fine Day, as George Clooney's daughter Maggie Taylor. The same year, Whitman guest starred in the season three episode of Friends, "The One Where Rachel Quits". Between 1996 and 1998, she starred in 17 episodes of the David E. Kelley medical drama Chicago Hope. Later, she played Sandra Bullock's daughter, Bernice Pruitt, in Hope Floats. Whitman played the role of Chloe Madison on JAG In several guest appearances from 1998 to 2001 before starring in the Fox Family series State of Grace. In that series, she portrayed Grace, a girl from a Catholic background who befriends Hannah (Alia Shawkat), a Jewish girl.

=== 2000s ===
From 2004 to 2006, Whitman had a recurring role on Arrested Development. She also voiced Katara on Avatar: The Last Airbender from 2005 to 2008. Whitman appeared in the 2006 series Thief for FX Networks, playing the stepdaughter of Nick Atwater (Andre Braugher). Whitman made several high-profile guest appearances in 2006 and 2007. She also appeared on Desperate Housewives in the episode "Nice She Ain't" as Sarah, an unscrupulous friend of Julie Mayer (Andrea Bowen). Whitman also had a recurring role on Chicago Hope (1994–2000), playing the daughter of Dr. Kate Austin (Christine Lahti), in the series' later years.

Whitman was initially cast in the 2007 series remake of Bionic Woman, playing the deaf younger sister of the title character. On June 27, 2007, TV Guide reported that Whitman was being replaced in the role of Jaime's sister and Lucy Hale was cast as Whitman's replacement the following July. An NBC spokesperson confirmed this, stating "The decision was purely creatively driven. It is very common to change storylines, characters, actors after the initial pilot is shot." The sister character's hearing was restored after this recasting at the request of an NBC executive.

She also appeared in the 2008 episode "Streetwise" of Law & Order: Special Victims Unit as an on-the-street-mother who adopts street children and testifies against her husband after her adopted daughter is murdered. She appeared in the HBO series In Treatment as the supporting character Rosie.

Whitman voiced the character Tinker Bell in the Disney eponymous film series. As part of a deal to promote the production of the first Tinker Bell film, the UK's speaking clock started to use her voice at 0100GMT on October 26, 2008. Furthermore, she voiced Katara in Avatar: The Last Airbender, Rose in American Dragon: Jake Long, and played Cynder in The Legend of Spyro: The Eternal Night.

=== 2010s ===
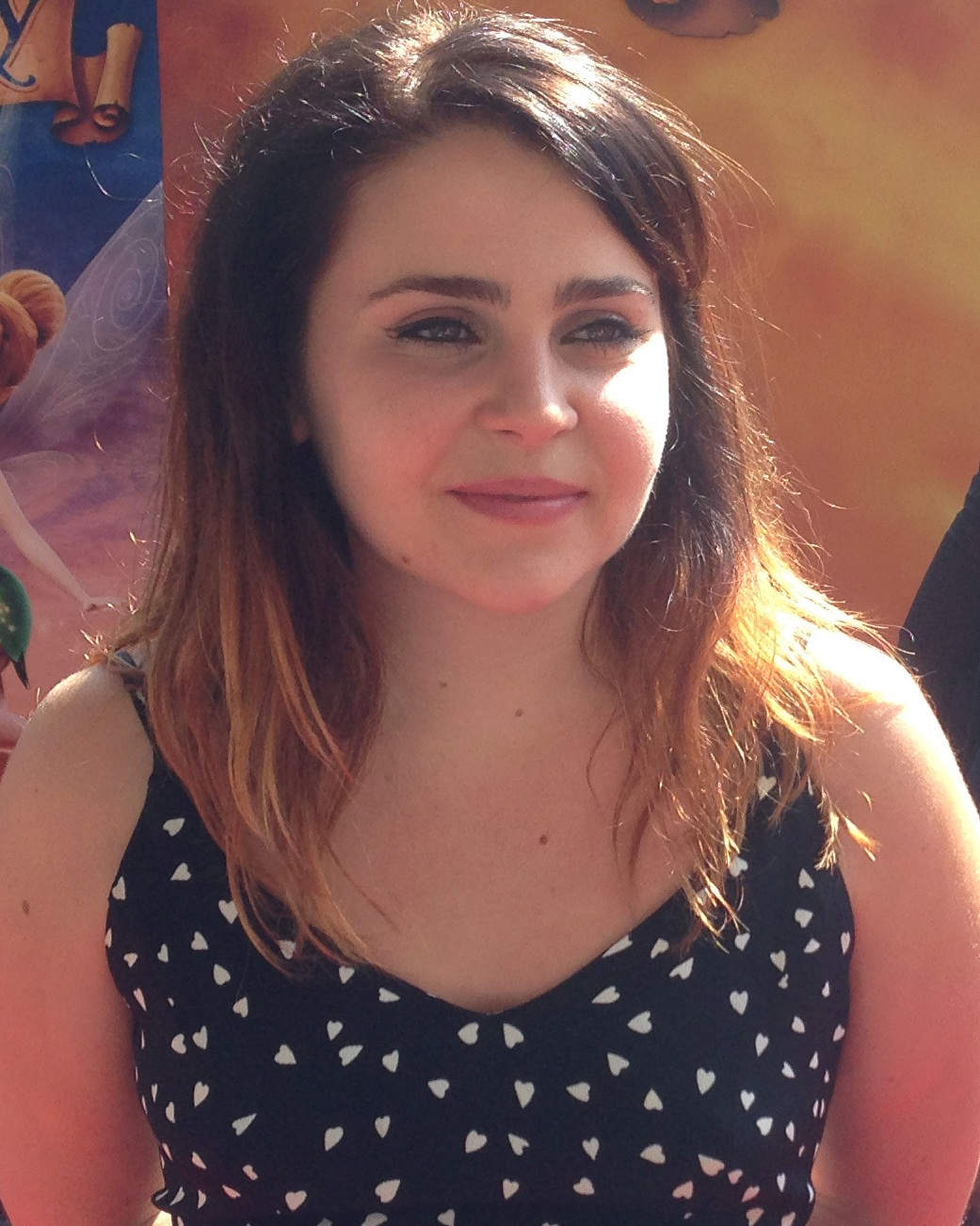
Whitman at the premiere of The Pirate Fairy in 2014

In 2009, Whitman landed a regular role in NBC's version of the Ron Howard classic Parenthood, which premiered in 2010. She played Amber Holt, "a rebellious and willful teen whose only interest at present is her wannabe rock star boyfriend." Whitman played evil ex Roxy Richter in Edgar Wright's Scott Pilgrim vs. the World, a film adaptation of the Bryan Lee O'Malley indie comic series Scott Pilgrim, which also starred her former Arrested Development co-star Michael Cera in the title role. Whitman appeared on Family Guy in 2010. She had a large role in the 2012 film The Perks of Being a Wallflower opposite Logan Lerman, Emma Watson and Ezra Miller.

Whitman has recorded "I Heard The Bells On Christmas Day" and "You Make Christmas Feel So Good" for School's Out! Christmas, and has sung guest vocals on a number of tracks from indie-punk band Fake Problems' 2010 album Real Ghosts Caught on Tape. Whitman has also been featured on her show Parenthood in the song "Gardenia" on the season two episode "The Booth Job" along with Landon Pigg. Whitman appears in the music videos for "I Was a Fool" and "Boyfriend" by Tegan and Sara. She performed a small speaking part in the rapper DVS' track "Charlie Chaplin" where she plays the part of what DVS sees as the stereotypical hipster expressing distaste with music and television to appear special.

In 2013, she reprised her role as Ann Veal in Arrested Development's season four, six years after the series was canceled. She appeared alongside Darren Criss in three episodes of season three of Lisa Kudrow's Web Therapy, playing his girlfriend. In 2015, Whitman played the lead role in the comedy The DUFF. She also started filming Operator alongside Martin Starr in June. She voiced Batgirl in DC's Super Hero Girls series debuting on September 10, 2016. According to co-writer and director Roland Emmerich, Whitman did not reprise her role as the President's daughter in Independence Day: Resurgence, the sequel to the 1996 blockbuster hit Independence Day, because she did not want to read for the part, though other sources indicate there might have been other reasons involved.

Whitman has expressed her feelings on being typecast as an outsider in various roles in television and films. She has talked about being a child actor and her experience being bullied in high school for being "weird." In an interview with Bello Mag, Whitman explains that the entertainment industry constantly tells actors what they are "not" and felt her choosing of these roles was her "trying to communicate to everyone" who may go through similar situations, that it's okay to be who they are. One of Whitman's more notable quotes is, "People should recognize who you are and how you can act rather than how famous you are."

In 2018, Whitman was cast alongside Retta and her Tinker Bell co-star Christina Hendricks on the NBC dramedy Good Girls. The show was renewed for a fourth season on May 15, 2020. In June 2021, the series was canceled after four seasons.

=== 2020s ===
Whitman appears in the 2020 musical film Valley Girl, a remake of the 1983 film of the same name. From 2020 to 2023, she voiced Amity Blight in The Owl House. She played a leading role in the Hulu original series Up Here in 2023, which was cancelled after one season.

== Personal life ==
Whitman was in a relationship with Miniature Tigers lead singer Charlie Brand during the 2010s; she contributed vocals to their album I Dreamt I Was a Cowboy.

On May 12, 2024, Whitman announced she was pregnant with her first child. She gave birth to a son on August 28, 2024. Actor and singer Carlos Valdes was revealed to be the father in March 2025.

On August 16, 2021, shortly after the airing of The Owl House episode "Knock, Knock, Knocking on Hooty's Door", Whitman came out as pansexual via Twitter, saying she knows she can "fall in love with people of all genders" and that she wished there were characters representing people like her when she was growing up. She is also open about her struggle with endometriosis, which went undiagnosed for 15 years.

== Filmography ==
=== Film ===
Year	Title	Role	Notes
1994	When a Man Loves a Woman	Casey Green	
1995	Bye Bye Love	Michele	
1996	Independence Day	Patricia Whitmore	
1996	One Fine Day	Maggie Taylor	
1998	The Gingerbread Man	Libby Magruder	
1998	Hope Floats	Bernice Pruitt	
1999	Mickey's Once Upon a Christmas	Girl	Voice, direct to video
1999	Invisible Child	Rebecca 'Doc' Beeman	
1999	A Season for Miracles	Alanna 'Lani' Thompson	
2001	An American Rhapsody	Maria (age 10)	
2002	The Wild Thornberrys Movie	Schoolgirl	Voice
2003	The Jungle Book 2	Shanti	Voice
2004	Teacher's Pet	Leslie	Voice
2005	Going Shopping	Coco	
2006	The Bondage	Angelica	
2006	Love's Abiding Joy	Colette Doros	
2007	Boogeyman 2	Alison	
2008	Nights in Rodanthe	Amanda Willis	
2008	Tinker Bell	Tinker Bell	Voice
2009	Tinker Bell and the Lost Treasure	Tinker Bell	Voice
2009	Spring Breakdown	Lydia	Direct to video
2010	Barry Munday	Candice	
2010	Scott Pilgrim vs. the World	Roxanne "Roxy" Richter	
2010	Scott Pilgrim vs. the Animation	Lisa Miller	Voice; Short
2010	Tinker Bell and the Great Fairy Rescue	Tinker Bell	Voice
2011	The Factory	Abby Fletcher	
2011	Pixie Hollow Games	Tinker Bell	Voice; Short
2012	Secret of the Wings	Tinker Bell	Voice
2012	The Perks of Being a Wallflower	Mary Elizabeth	
2013	Pixie Hollow Bake Off	Tinker Bell	Voice; short
2014	The Pirate Fairy	Tinker Bell	Voice
2014	Tinker Bell and the Legend of the NeverBeast	Tinker Bell	Voice
2014	The Wind Rises	Kayo, Kinu	English dub
2015	The DUFF	Bianca Piper	
2015	Freaks of Nature	Jenna Zombie	
2016	Rock Dog	Darma	Voice
2016	DC Super Hero Girls: Hero of the Year	Barbara Gordon / Batgirl	Voice, direct to video
2016	Operator	Emily Klein	
2017	Bernard and Huey	Zelda	
2017	CHiPs	Beebee	
2017	DC Super Hero Girls: Intergalactic Games	Barbara Gordon / Batgirl	Voice, direct to video
2017	Dear Angelica	Jessica	Voice; Short
2018	A Dog and Pony Show	Dede	Voice, direct to video
2018	Duck Butter	Ellen	
2018	DC Super Hero Girls: Legends of Atlantis	Barbara Gordon / Batgirl	Voice, direct to video
2020	Valley Girl	Jack	

=== Television ===
Year	Title	Role	Notes
1995	Degree of Guilt	Elena Argos	Television film
1995	Naomi & Wynonna: Love Can Build a Bridge	Young Ashley Judd	Television film
1996	After Jimmy	Rosie	Television film
1996	Duckman	Baby Rose	Voice, episode: "Sperms of Endearment"
1996	Early Edition	Amanda Bailey	Episode: "The Choice"
1996	Friends	Sarah Tuttle	Episode: "The One Where Rachel Quits"
1996	What a Cartoon!	Little Suzy	Voice, episode: "Johnny Bravo and the Amazon Women"
1996–1999	Chicago Hope	Sara Wilmette	Recurring role
1997	Superman: The Animated Series	Young Lois Lane	Voice, episode: "Monkey Fun"
1997	Merry Christmas, George Bailey	Zuzu Bailey	Television film
1997	The Legend of Calamity Jane	Eleanor Roosevelt	Voice
1997–2004	Johnny Bravo	Little Suzy, various voices	Recurring role
1998–2001	JAG	Chloe Madison	Recurring role
1999	Invisible Child	Rebecca 'Doc' Beeman	Television film
1999	Judging Amy	Darcy Mitchell	Episode: "Last Tango in Hartford"
1999	Providence	Frances Carlyle	2 episodes
1999	Jingle Bells	Beth	Voice, television film
1999	Hallmark Hall of Fame	Alanna 'Lani' Thompson	Episode: "A Season for Miracles"
1999	The Sylvester & Tweety Mysteries	Little Girl	Voice, episode: "This Is the Kitty/Eye for an Aye Aye"
2000–2002	Teacher's Pet	Leslie Dunkling	Voice, 5 episodes
2000	Godzilla: The Series	Meg	Voice, episode: "Shafted"
2000	The Wild Thornberrys	Antoinette	Voice, episode: "Luck Be an Aye-Aye"
2001	Max Steel	Jo	Voice, episode: "The Return"
2001	Jackie Chan Adventures	Buttercup Scout Leader	Episode: "Scouts Honor"
2001–2002	State of Grace	Emma Grace McKee	Main role
2002	Presidio Med	Tory Redding	Episode: "Do No Harm"
2002	The Zeta Project	Amy	Voice, episode: "The River Rising"
2002–2004	Fillmore!	Various voices	Recurring role
2003	Whatever Happened to... Robot Jones?	Various voices	4 episodes
2004	Cold Case	Eve Kendall	Episode: "Lover's Lane"
2004	CSI: Crime Scene Investigation	Glynnis Carson	Episode: "No Humans Involved"
2004	Century City	Erin Pace	Episode: "Without a Tracer"
2003-2006; 2013	Arrested Development	Ann Veal	Recurring role
2005	The Happy Elf	Molly	Voice, television film
2005–2007	American Dragon: Jake Long	Rose / Huntsgirl, additional voices	Recurring role
2005–2008	Avatar: The Last Airbender	Katara, Lu Ten	Voice, main role
2006	Thief	Tammi Deveraux	6 episodes
2006	Desperate Housewives	Sarah	Episode: "Nice She Ain't"
2006	Jesse Stone: Death in Paradise	Emily Bishop	Television film
2006	Phil of the Future	Crying Girl	Episode: "Stuck in the Meddle with You"
2007	Justice	Jenny Marshall	Episode: "False Confession"
2007	Grey's Anatomy	Heather Douglas	2 episodes
2007	Lost in the Dark	Amy Tolliver	Television film
2007	Ghost Whisperer	Rachel Fordham	Episode: "Don't Try This at Home"
2007	ER	Heather	Episode: "The Test"
2007	The Modifyers	Agent Zero, Lacey Shadows	Voice, pilot
2008	Law & Order: Special Victims Unit	Cassidy Cornell / Helen Braidwell	Episode: "Streetwise"
2008	Good Behavior	Roxy West	Pilot
2008–2010	In Treatment	Rosie Weston	5 episodes
2008–2023	Family Guy	Various voices	Recurring role
2009	Acceptance	Taylor Rockefeller	Television film
2009	Criminal Minds	Julie	Episode: "Cradle to Grave"
2009	Glenn Martin, DDS	Amish Girl, Trailer Park Teen	Voice, 2 episodes
2009–2010	The Cleveland Show	Additional voices	2 episodes
2010–2015	Parenthood	Amber Holt	Main role
2010	Batman: The Brave and the Bold	Barbara Gordon / Batgirl	Voice, 2 episodes
2010	Jesse Stone: No Remorse	Emily Bishop	Television film
2011–2022	Robot Chicken	Various voices	4 episodes
2012–2013 & 2019–2022	Young Justice	Cassie Sandsmark / Wonder Girl, Stephanie Brown, Tommi Tompkins, Helena Sandsmark	Voice, recurring role
2012	Weeds	Tula	Episode: "See Blue and Smell Cheese and Die"
2012–2017	Teenage Mutant Ninja Turtles	April O'Neil, various voices	Recurring role
2012 & 2015–2018	DreamWorks Dragons	Heather	Voice, recurring role
2013	Web Therapy	Blair Yellin	3 episodes
2013	Masters of Sex	Patient	Episode: "Standard Deviation"
2013–2014 & 2019	American Dad!	Glitter, Zooey, additional voices	4 episodes
2014	Suburgatory	Caris	Episode: "Blame it on the Rainstick"
2014	AJ's Infinite Summer	Morgan, Receptionist	Voice, pilot
2015	Robot Chicken DC Comics Special III: Magical Friendship	Power Girl	Voice, television film
2015–2018	DC Super Hero Girls	Barbara Gordon / Batgirl, Speed Queen	Voice, main role
2016	DC Super Hero Girls: Super Hero High	Barbara Gordon / Batgirl, Speed Queen	Voice, television film
2016–2019	Drunk History	Herself, Lyudmila Pavlichenko	3 episodes
2016	Gilmore Girls: A Year in the Life	Marcy	Episode: "Spring"
2017	Voltron: Legendary Defender	Plaxum	Voice, episode: "Depths"
2017	Room 104	Liza	Episode: "Phoenix"
2017	Big Mouth	Tallulah Levine	Voice, episode: "The Head Push"
2018–2021	Good Girls	Annie Marks	Main role
2020–2023	The Owl House	Amity Blight	Voice, main role
2020	American Experience	Additional voices	Episode: "The Vote"
2020	Kidding	Chloe	Episode: "I Wonder What Grass Tastes Like"; uncredited
2020–2022	Doug Unplugs	Becky Bot	Voice, main role
2021	Invincible	Connie / War Woman II, Model	Voice, episode: "It's About Time"
2022	Birdgirl	Reporter	Voice, episode: "With a K"
2023	Up Here	Lindsay	Main role
2023	Skull Island	Annie	Voice, main role
2023	Scott Pilgrim Takes Off	Roxanne "Roxie" Richter	Voice
2024–2025	Chibiverse	Amity Blight	Voice, 2 episodes
2025	Twelve Dates 'Til Christmas	Kate	Main Role, mini-series

=== Video games ===
Year	Title	Voice role	Notes	References
2004	EverQuest II	Lilly Ironforge, Thana Rumblehoof		
2005	Kingdom Hearts II	Yuffie Kisaragi	Also appears in Final Mix+ in 2007	
2006	Cartoon Network Racing	Little Suzy		
2006	Dirge of Cerberus: Final Fantasy VII	Yuffie Kisaragi		
2006	Avatar: The Last Airbender	Katara		
2007	The Legend of Spyro: The Eternal Night	Cynder		
2007	Avatar: The Last Airbender – The Burning Earth	Katara		
2008	Avatar: The Last Airbender – Into the Inferno	Katara		
2011	Nicktoons MLB	Katara		
2013	Young Justice: Legacy	Helena Sandsmark, Cassie Sandsmark / Wonder-Girl		
2013	Teenage Mutant Ninja Turtles	April O'Neil		
2014	Teenage Mutant Ninja Turtles: Danger of the Ooze	April O'Neil		
2014	Disney Infinity 2.0	Tinker Bell		
2014	How to Train Your Dragon: School of Dragons	Heather		
2015	Stronghold Crusader II	The Princess (DLC Voice)		
2014 & 2017	Kingdom Hearts HD 2.5 Remix	Yuffie	Archive sound	
2017	Prey	Danielle Sho		
2020	Kingdom Hearts III Re Mind	Yuffie		

=== Audio books ===
Year	Novel	Voice role
2014	The Mortal Instruments: City of Bones	Clary Fray
2019	The Testaments	Nichole / Daisy
2022	The Unsinkable Greta James	Narrator
2024	The Great Indoors	Narrator
2025	Better Luck Next Time	Mona
