= Seconds (comics) =

2014 graphic novel by Bryan Lee O'Malley

- Cover of Seconds
- Date: July 15, 2014 (first edition)
- Publisher: Ballantine Books

Creative team
- Writers: Bryan Lee O'Malley
- Artists: Bryan Lee O'Malley; Jason Fischer (assistant)
- Letterer: Dustin Harbin
- Colourist: Nathan Fairbairn
- ISBN: 978-0-345-52937-4; 978-0-553-39436-8 (Barnes & Nobel special edition); 978-0-553-39435-1 (Comic-Con special edition (numbered)); 978-0-553-39434-4 (Comic-Con special edition (lettered)); 978-0-345-53878-9 (eBook)

Seconds is a graphic novel by Bryan Lee O'Malley. Published on July 15, 2014, by Ballantine Books, the novel tells the story of Katie Clay, head chef at a prospering restaurant named Seconds, who obtains the ability to fix her past mistakes by writing them down in a notebook, eating a mushroom, and falling asleep. Abusing the power to make her life perfect, Katie ends up creating more problems for herself.

== Plot summary ==
The "immaculately printed instruction card" Katie finds in her drawer.

Katie is the founding owner of a popular restaurant named Seconds. Katie inhabits a room in Seconds and is woken up one night by a mysterious, white-haired girl named Lis, who gives Katie a notepad, a single mushroom, and instructions for her to follow to cast a "do-over" spell in order to fix her past mistakes. Katie finds more mushrooms under the floorboard in the restaurant and uses them to fix problems arising with the construction of a brand new restaurant, her relationship with her ex-boyfriend, and to prevent the injury of a waitress named Hazel. Despite Lis' rule of one mushroom per person, Katie ignores Lis' concerns and seeks to use the mushrooms to make her life perfect, but unintentionally creates more problems as a result and disrupts the balance of time and space.

== Characters ==
- Katie is the main character and founder of the restaurant, Seconds. She wants to open up a new restaurant with her business partner, Arthur. However, she gets into quite the predicament when she gains the ability to rewrite the past.
- Lis is a house spirit who haunts Seconds. She is the owner of the mushrooms that can rewrite the past and gave them to Katie. Lis wears the outfits and eats the food that Hazel leaves at Seconds to keep her happy.
- Arthur is Katie's new business partner who wants to open up a new restaurant, called Katie's, with her.
- Max is Katie's ex-boyfriend, who broke up with her when she did not tell him about the new restaurant she wanted. They met when Max was working in the kitchen of Seconds. He eventually gets back together with her unknowingly due to Katie and the mushrooms.
- Hazel is a shy waitress who becomes close with Katie after she has an accident in which she burns her arms. However, Katie undoes the events of the accident using the mushrooms. She lives with her grandmother and shops at thrift stores. It is revealed that Hazel leaves gifts for Lis to keep her happy.
- Andrew is Katie's successor as the head chef at Seconds. Katie enters a relationship with him, thus cheating on Max.

== Reception ==
Seconds received positive reviews. IGN awarded it an 8.8/10, with reviewer Jesse Schedeen calling it a "a great way to follow-up the mega-popular Scott Pilgrim series." The Telegraph's Ben Travis also gave the graphic novel a warm review. "As a standalone novel," Travis writes, "Seconds may not have the scope of the Scott Pilgrim series, but it's a perfectly formed piece. While some pop culture-laden works of art quickly lose relevance, the honesty and humanity in Seconds will keep readers returning again and again."

== Film adaptation ==
In April 2022, it was announced that Blake Lively would direct a film adaptation of Seconds for Searchlight Pictures, with Edgar Wright (who directed and co-wrote the feature film adaptation of O'Malley's Scott Pilgrim series) writing the screenplay and producing the film alongside Marc Platt.
