= Clash at Demonhead =

1989 video game

- North American cover art
- Developer(s): Vic Tokai
- Publisher(s): Vic Tokai
- Designer(s): Haruhiko Kawamura
- Programmer(s): Norihiro Hisamatsu; Tomiko Narusawa; Mayumi Sano
- Artist(s): Kazuaki Kinoshita
- Composer(s): Michiharu Hasuya
- Platform(s): Nintendo Entertainment System
- Release: JP: January 27, 1989; NA: December 1989
- Genre(s): Action-adventure, platform, Metroidvania
- Mode(s): Single-player

Clash at Demonhead, known in Japan as Dengeki Big Bang! (Japanese: 電撃ビッグバン!, Hepburn: Dengeki Biggu Ban!; Blitz Big Bang!), is an action-adventure platform game released by Vic Tokai for the Nintendo Entertainment System on January 27, 1989 in Japan and December 1989 in North America.

== Gameplay ==
After being killed by some small enemies, Billy's soul went to heaven.

Clash at Demonhead is an open-ended platformer. The player takes control of Billy "Big Bang" Blitz, who is capable of running, jumping, and shooting. He is initially armed with a handgun, though various upgrades can be purchased from a shop, such as the boomerang gun. He later gains the ability to perform various powers by collecting Force, including shrinking, teleportation to previously-visited areas, flight, healing, and invincibility. The game is divided into a number of smaller stages, each representing a point on the over-world map. There are over 40 routes the player can take in the game, and the player must explore the world to progress. The game is non-linear in that the player can choose which direction they go, being allowed to backtrack and visit different stages.

== Plot ==
Billy "Big Bang" Blitz is a sergeant in S.A.B.R.E. (Special Assault Brigade for Real Emergencies). He is contacted during a vacation at the beach with his girlfriend Mary to save Professor Plum, creator of a Doomsday Bomb capable of destroying the world. Bang soon encounters Tom Guycot, the skeleton mastermind behind the abduction, and he learns that the Doomsday Bomb is controlled by six medallions which have been distributed among the seven governors of Demonhead. On his journey, Bang encounters Michael, who claims to be Bang's ally and tells him about a grieving sprite. Upon meeting the sprite, he learns of a captured hermit who teaches Bang various force powers upon rescuing him. While searching for the rest of the medallions, Bang repeatedly experiences strange mental discomfort.

Bang later discovers that the discomfort is a failed attempt at mind control by a demon trapped beneath the mountain at Demonhead's northern end. The demon failed to control Bang, but manages to control Bang's ally, Michael. The demon sets up a plot through Michael to entice Bang with treasure requiring the use of a Magic Stone. The Magic Stone ends up being the key to freeing the demon from its imprisonment. After Bang fails to defeat the demon, it seeks out and kills Tom Guycot and steals his medallion. Bang learns from the hermit that the demon can only be destroyed with the Sword of Apollo.

Upon defeating the demon and recovering Guycot's medallion, Bang attempts to rescue Professor Plum, but learns that the Doomsday Bomb is already complete. The bomb turns out to be technology from an alien race responsible for creating humanity one thousand years ago. They have grown disappointed with their creation's destructive tendencies, and intend to use the bomb to hasten what they believe is the inevitable end of the world. The only way to defuse the bomb is with the medallions, but with no instructions, Bang can only guess where each medallion is placed, and is working against a countdown timer that triggers the bomb. When Bang succeeds, the alien voices its disdain that humanity will live on and announces that the alien race intends to leave Earth to its own devices and never return. Bang responds that from now on humans will look after themselves. Bang escapes Demonhead with the Hermit to reunite with Mary and receives congratulations from his commander, who also informs that Professor Plum managed to free himself and the aliens tried to fool Bang with an impostor. The Hermit offers Bang an apprenticeship, but Bang declines to see about "making a game based on these adventures!"

== Regional differences ==
Aside from the language, there are a few difference between the Japanese and American releases. The Japanese version uses the yen for the money currency in the game whereas the American localization has the dollar sign instead. Other changes brought to the American version include a different titlescreen, the removal of some dialogues in the game and the adding of a mustache to the shopkeeper. Like several video games from that era, the Japanese version has ending credits that were removed on the American localization.

== Reception ==
Allgame gave the game a score of 2.5 out of 5.

== In popular culture ==
"The Clash at Demonhead" is the name of a band in the comic book series Scott Pilgrim. The band also appears in the 2010 film adaptation of the novels, Scott Pilgrim vs. the World, as well as in the subsequent video game adaptation. The band is named after the 1989 video game, as well as their drummer - Lynette Guycott - being named after Tom Guycott. The creator of the comic book, Bryan Lee O'Malley, has said that Clash at Demonhead was the first NES title he ever played.
