= Aki Mizusawa =

Japanese actress (born 1954)

- 水沢 アキ
- Born: Akiko Tamei 溜井 昭子; 5 December 1954 (age 71); Tokyo, Japan
- Other names: Akiko or Aki Mizusawa 水沢 あき子 (former stage name); Akiko Cihi スィーヒ 昭子 (after marriage)
- Occupations: Actress; television personality; model
- Years active: 1972–
- Height: 157 cm (5 ft 2 in)
- Spouse: Guy Cihi (m. 1986; div. 1993)
- Children: 2, including Julian Cihi

Akiko Tamei (溜井 昭子, Tamei Akiko; born 5 December 1954), better known by her former stage name as Aki Mizusawa (水沢 アキ, Mizusawa Aki), is a Japanese actress, tarento, model, and singer.

== Biography ==
Mizusawa was born in Meguro, Tokyo and graduated from the Japan Women's College of Physical Education (Dance Major) in 1977.

She made her acting debut in October 1972 in the TBS Television drama Natsu ni Kita Musume, based on Keita Genji's novel Aozora Musume. Meanwhile, she dropped out from Yamawaki Gakuen High School because they were banning performing arts activities and transferred to Nikaido High School.

On 1 July 1973, she made her debut as a singer at CBS Sony Records (now Sony Music Entertainment (SMEJ)) with Musume-gokoro with the catchphrase "Three women of the Sony family". In 1973, she adopted her current stage name "Aki Mizusawa".

She made regular appearances in NHK's popular quiz show Rensō Game since 1975.

She worked as a model including swimwear and other assignments including adult magazines. She has had a number of film and television series roles.

=== Private life ===
In 1986, she married American businessman and voice actor Guy Cihi. They had a son and daughter, but divorced in 1993.

Her son, Julian Cihi, debuted as an actor in 2011. Her daughter, Frances Cihi, is a tarento, painter and English conversation teacher who appeared on the reality television series Terrace House: Boys × Girls Next Door.

== Appearances ==
=== TV dramas ===
- Natsu ni Kita Musume (1972, TBS)
- Manmaru Shikaku (1973, TBS)
- Ikite Aishite (1973, NHK)
- Tenka Dōdō (1973, NHK)
- Dokkoi Daisaku (1973, NET) – as Kyoko Narumi
  - Episode 47 "Seishun no hitotsu" (1973)
  - Episode 58 "Jō Muyō no Nihonichi" (1974)
- Onmitsu Kenshi: Tsuppashire! Episode 2 "Soratobu Shintarō" (1974, TBS) – as Mitsuyo
- Jikengari Episode 8 (1974, TBS)
- Brother Gekijō
  - Wakai Sensei (1974) – as Keiko Katsuki
  - Soreike! Katchin Episode 7 "Sensei no Otoshidama" (1976)
- Playgirl Q Episode 17 "Onna wa Hadaka de Tsuyokunaru" (1975, 12ch/Toei)
- Furimuku na Tsurukichi Episode 22 (1975, NHK)
- Toshiba Nichiyō Gekijō (TBS)
  - 945th "Ashita mata" (1975) Sugako Hashida/Screenplay
  - 970th "Ai tte nā ni" (1975) Sugako Hashida/Screenplay
  - 983rd "Daremo Shiranai Ai" (1975) Sugako Hashida/Screenplay
- Chin Dondon (1975, NTV)
- Tōyama no Kin-san 1st Series (1975, NET/Toei)
- Moeru Sōsamō Episode 3 (1975, NET/Toei)
- Jitte Muyō: Kuchō Hori Koto-ken Jō Episode 7 "Nusutto Jingi" (1975, NTV/Toei)
- Dai Tokai Tatakai no Hibi Episode 1 "Imōto" (1976, NTV/Ishihara Promotion) – as Motoko Nakagawa
- Machāki no Mori no Hikage no Kazura Episodes 25–26 (1976, NET)
- Taiyō ni Hoero! (Toho/NTV)
  - Episode 185 "Niji" (1976) – Kayo Mizushima
  - Episode 462 "Anata ni Sono-goe ga Kikoeru ka" (1981) – Haruko Asou
  - Episode 466 "Hitori botchi no Shi" (1981) – same as above
  - Episode 497 "Gori-san ga Kenjū o Utenaku natta!" (1982) – same as above
  - Episode 512 "Fiance no Shi" (1982) – same as above
  - Episode 523 "Gori-san, Shi no Taiketsu" (1982) – same as above
  - Episode 525 "Ishizuka Keiji Junshoku" (1982) – same as above
  - Episode 665 "Junshokukeiji-tachi yo, ya sura kani" (1985) – same as above
- Ōedo Sōsamō Episode 228 "Manbiki Hime Dai Funsen" (1976, 12ch/Mifune Pro) – as Ayahime
- Agari Itchō! (1976, NTV)
- Kazue wa Kazue (1976, NHK)
- Kāsan Dōdō (1977, TBS) – Junko Mizuki
- Mito Kōmon (TBS/C.A.L)
  - Part 8 Episode 1 "Satsuma e Mukau Yonaoshi Tabi-Edo" (1977) – as Ojun
  - Part 10 Episode 10 "Mukoiri Hatchō Miso-Okazaki" (1979) – as Oyoshi
  - Part 14 Episode 8 "Ninjō Benibana Fūfu Some-Yonezawa" (1984) – as Oen
- Suna no Utsuwa (1977, CX) – as Hanae*Re-edited broadcast in 1985
- Saturday Night at the Mysteries (EX)
  - Saigo no Kake/Rō Keiji to Kinko-yaburi (1977, Daiei/Haiyuza Movie Broadcasting Department)
  - Kyōhaku Kōfuku o Kaimasen ka (1978, EX/Toho)
- Kimagure Honkakuha (1977–78, NTV)
- Honō no Ie Ai wa Ni-do Umareru (1978, KTV)
- Daruma Taisuke Jikenchō Episode 21 "Kaette Kita Kōfuku" (1978, EX/Zenshinza/KHK) – as Oshin
- Kurenai Kujaku (1978, NHK) voice appearance
- National Golden Gekijō (EX)
  - Teki ka? Mikata ka 3 Tai 3 (1978)
  - Dareka-san to Dareka-san (1978)
- Kieta Giants (1978, NTV) – as Fumiko
- Fūrintori Monochō (1978, EX/Toei)
- Shinshun Suiri Series (2) "Neko ga Hakonda Shinbun" (1979, EX)
- Netsuai Ikka Love (1979, TBS)
- Majo Densetsu (1979, CX)
- Onna-tachi no Ie (1980, CX) Yumie Hiraiwa/Screenplay
- The Shōsha (1980, NHK) – as Kaoru
- Hashire! Nekketsu Keiji (1981, EX)
- Netchū Jidai 2nd Series Episode 34 "Netchū-sensei to Nagai Sakubun" (1981, NTV) – as Noriko Asakura
- Kakurenbo (1981, NTV)
- Ginga TV Shōsetsu Fukkatsu (1981, NHK)
- Saturday Night at the Mysteries Tōrima Renzoku Satsujin Osowa reta Danchi Tsuma (1981, EX)
- Saturday Night at the Mysteries Maboroshi no Onna Rikon Satsujin no Wana (1981, EX)
- Saturday Night at the Mysteries Kyōsaku Suiri Series 1 Ryōri Kyōshitsu Satsujin Jiken Tamago no Trick (1981, EX)
- Ame agari no Onna (1982, EX)
- Matsudaira Ukon Jiken-chō (1982, NTV) – as Osayo
- Kayō Suspense Gekijō Kōkō Yakyū Satsujin Jiken (1982, NTV)
- Bigō o Shitte imasu ka (1982, NHK) – 11th International Emmy Award Excellence Award Winning Work in United States
- Kimi wa Umi o Mitaka (1982, CX)
- Saturday Night at the Mysteries Seicho Matsumoto no Kiken na Shamen Hakkotsu ni natta Onna (1982, EX) – as Ryoko Noseki
- Saturday Night at the Mysteries Imōto o Okashita Otoko Naki Ryū no Nazo o Motomete (1982, EX)
- Doyō Drama Tsuiseki Episode 3 (5 Feb 1983, NHK)
- Ōoku (1983, KTV)
  - Episode 12 "Mizaru Iwazaru Kikazaru" – as Oriki
  - Episode 35 "Un no Warui Onna-tachi", Episode 36 "Mikkai" – as Takehime
- Getsuyō Wide Gekijō Uchi Yome Sensō Ganko oyaji VS Bjin Shimai Rengō-gun! (1983, EX)
- Saturday Night at the Mysteries Danchi Tsuma no sakebi Kekkon Go-nen-me no Hakyoku! (1983, EX)
- Toshiba Nichiyō Gekijō 1438th "29-Sai" (1984, TBS)
- Yūzora harete (1984, CBC)
- Ōoka Echizen: Dai 8-bu Episode 26 "Shōgun Sukutta Bijo Gundan" (21 Jan 1985, TBS/C.A.L) – as Misa
- Kayō Suspense Gekijō Kyoto Bojō Satsujin Jiken (1985, NTV)
- Toshiba Nichiyō Gekijō 1473rd "Roji kara no Kefuhakujiyau" (1985, RKB
- Saturday Night at the Mysteries Office Tsuma no sakebi Chōkōsōbiru kara Shi no Tōshin!? (1985, EX)
- Mokuyō Golden Drama Anata wa Tsuma o Sukueru ka (1985, YTV)
- Mokuyō Golden Drama Anata ni Nita Ko (1985, YTV)
- Asobi janai no yo, kono Koi wa (1986, TBS)
- Saturday Night at the Mysteries Hakui no Fukugō Satsujin (1987, EX)
- Onsen Nakai Monogatari (7) "Dōkeshima meguri Ai-Nami no Se ni Otome no Uta ga Chiru" (1987, TX)
- Sanbon Ashi no Mei Mōdōken Serve Ai no Monogatari (1989, EX)
- Misa Yamamura Suspense Kyoto Higashiyama Satsujin Jiken (1990, EX) – as Ryoko Morimiya
- Kao Ai no Gekijō Issho ni Kurashitai (1990, TBS)
- Sasurai Keiji Ryojō-hen III Episode 12 (1990, EX)
- TV Ehon Crayon Ōkoku (1990, 1993, NHK E) – Recitation
- Haha (1990, TX)
- Dramatic 22 "Gokugoku Heibon na Katei no 'Kōfukuna Sei'" (1990, TBS)
- Kayō Mystery Gekijō Kangofu-chō Suiri Karute Onsen Byōin Kaiki Renzoku Satsujin Jiken (1991, EX)
- Saturday Night at the Mysteries Kaseifu wa Mita! 10 (1992, EX)
- Muttsu no Rikon Suspense Hoken Shōsho ga Sasayaku (1992, KTV)
- Depart! Aki Monogatari Episode 8 (1992, TBS) – as Mrs. Yuki
- Junichi Yaoi no I Jigen World (2) "Taiji no Kioku" (1993, NTV)
- Doyō Drama Hōsō Kisha Monogatari (1995, NHK)
- Doshirōto Keiji Satsujin Jiken-bo (1996, TBS) – as Aya Akiyama
- Saturday Night at the Mysteries Kochira Zendera Tantei-kyoku: Kimyōna Senjafuda Renzoku Satsujin Jiken! (1996, EX)
- Kinyō Jidaigeki Yume-reki Nagasaki Bugyō Episode 8 (24 May 1996, NHK)
- Kindaichi Shōnen no Jikenbo 2nd Series Episodes 2–3/File 11 "Tarot Sansō Satsujin Jiken" (1996, NTV)
- Getsuyō Drama Special Doshirōto Keiji Satsujin Jiken-bo (1996, TBS)
- Weekend Drama Shiyou yo (1996, EX)
- Kinyō Entertainment Kyoto Yoru no Gion Satsujin Jiken (1997, CX)
- Drama Shinginga Konya mo Gochisōsama (1997, NHK)
- Uchi e Oideyo (1997, KTV)
- Seija no Kōshin (1998, TBS)
- Don Wallie! (1998, KTV)
- Konya mo Gochisōsama Sōshūhen (1998, NHK)
- Sawayaka Superwoman (1998, TBS)
- Kayō Suspense Gekijō Keibuho Jiro Tsukuda 6 (1998, NTV)
- Gekai Sanshiro Natsume (1998, EX) – as Makiko Tange
- Drama Ai no Shi Kora! Nanba shiyo tto (29 Dec 1998, NHK)
- Ultraman Gaia (1998–99, Tsuburaya Productions/MBS) – as Shigemi Takayama
- Asadora Yancha kure (1998–99, NHK)
- Kayō Suspense Gekijō Tsuiseki 5 (1999, NTV)
- Nagoya Senkyakubanrai (2000, NHK)
- Kayō Suspense Gekijō Keibuho Jiro Tsukuda 11 (2000, NTV)
- Drama 30 Konbi ni Maria (2001, CBC)
- Yankee Bokō ni Kaeru (2003, TBS)
- Kiken na Kankei (2005, THK)
- Rocket Boys (2006, TX)
- Saturday Night at the Mysteries Otori Sōsakan Shiho Kitami 10 (2006, EX)
- Suiyō Mystery 9 Yasuo Uchida Suspense: Shinano no Colombo 13: Mōmoku no Pianist (2006, BS Japan, TX)
- Taiga drama Fūrin Kazan Episode 2 (2007, NHK) – as Ōbayashi Kanzaemon (Takashi Sasano)'s wife, Kikuyo
- Friday Night Drama Tokumei Kakarichō Hitoshi Tadano (3rd Season) Episode 29 (2007, EX)
- Okawari`Hanzō (2007, TX)
- Joshideka! Episode 6 (22 Nov 2007, TBS) – as Mutsuko Tokita
- Kinyō Prestiege Tsugarukaikyō Mystery Kōro (7) (29 Feb 2008, CX) – as Noriko Nakamichi
- Jiro Akagawa Mystery 4 Shimai Tantei-dan Episode 8 (7 Mar 2008, ABC, EX) – as Shizue Yamane
- Tomorrow –Yō wa mata noboru– Episode 9 (31 Aug 2008, TBS) – as Masae Sendo
- Jin Episodes 4, 5, Final Episode (1, 8 Nov, 20 Dec 2009, TBS) – as Landlady
- Kinyō Prestiege Misa Yamamura Suspense Kuro no Kassōro –Kinji rareta Ichizoku– (13 Jan 2012, CX) – as Yuri Chintao
- Saturday Night at the Mysteries Kyotaro Nishimura Suspense Tetsudō Sōsa-kan 15 (4 Apr 2015, EX) – as Kazumi Kusunoki
- Suiyō Mystery 9 Hoken Hanzai Chōsa-in Hatsune Saeki Kūhaku no Kiten (20 Jul 2016, TX) – as Yoshiko Yamane
- Seicho Matsumoto Botsugo 25-nen Tokubetsu Kikaku Gosa (2017, TX) – as Saori Kawada

=== Films ===
- Shinjuku Baka Monogatari (1977) – as Noriko
- Dō ni Demo shite (1978)
- Tsuide no Mai (1984) – as Shima Shimamura
- Barrow Gang BC (1985) – as Nishino-sensei
- Star (1986) – as Sugissho
- Zukkoke Sanningumi Kaitō X Monogatari (Toei) (1998) – as Miyoko Yamanaka
- Yoshimoto Director's 100 Pakyura! (short film, 2007)
- San Jū Kyū-mai no Nengajō (2008)
- Yasashī Te (2011) – as Aoi

=== Stage ===
- Marius (1983)
- Aru Onna
- Mitsukoshi Summer Vacation Family Theater/Musical Cinderella (25 Jul – 2 Aug 2009, Mitsukoshi Theater, etc.) – as Witch
- Ai ga Korose to sasayaita (16–25 Sep 2011, Sogetsu Hall) – starring; as Aiko Tsuruta

=== Anime films ===
- Hashire Melos! (1992) – Queen Fulune

=== Dubbing ===
- Agatha Christie's Poirot "The Dream" – as Joanna Farley
- Chaplin

=== Radio ===
- Say! Young (1974–76, NCB)
- Aki Mizusawa no Fashionable World (1979–81, Tokyo FM)
- Energy Salon
- Shinosuke Radio Rakugo De Date (15 Nov 2009, NCB)

=== Advertisements ===
- Utena Keshōhin
- Kanebō Keito "Alps Keito," "Summer Bell," "Shan Bell"
- Nippon Denchi "GS Battery" (1979–80)
- Suntory "Haig" (British whisky) 1982 calendar (1981)
- Toyotomi Kōgyō "Toyo Stove" (1982–84)
- Ken Bix (2002)
- Cipher "Kanpō View"
- Dr. Ci:Labo "Ano Hito ga Akasu Biyō-hō"

=== Television (others) ===
- Wide Kodomo Show Bunbun Banban (1973–75, NET)
- Uta wa Tomodachi (1974, NHK)
- Variety Sekai Fumito Manyū (1975, NHK)
- Morning Jumbo Okusama 8-jihandesu (TBS)
- Quiz! Kazoku Doremifa Taishō (1976, CX) – Moderator with Takeaki Kashimura
- 9th Japan Music Awards (1978, EX) – Moderator with Tadao Takashima
- Rensō Game (1978–79, NHK) – Red Team captain
- The Request Show (1979–80, EX) – Moderator with Monta Mino
- Olympuson '80 (May 1980, EX) – Moscow Report
- Quiz Omoshiro Seminar (1981–86, NHK)
- Camera Gihō Nyūmon (1981–82, NHK E)
- Kinyō Omoshiro Variety Meitō! Hitō! Nihon no Onsen Best 101 (17 Oct 1986, CX) – Moderator
- Naruhodo! The World (CX) – Overseas reporter
- Game Sūji de Q (1991–92, NHK)
- Sukusuku Akachan (1992–93, NHK E)
- Quiz Nihonjin no Shitsumon (1994–98, NHK)
- Genki Kazoku (1998–2000, KTV)
- Shin Quiz Nihonjin no Shitsumon (2000–01, NHK)
- Aki Mizusawa-Manten Yume Shop (KTV)
- Ryōhin Kōbō TeleShop

=== Television advertisements ===
- Hisamitsu Pharmaceutical "New Salon Pass"
- Nomura Securities (1975)
- Shinkin bank
- Yoshihara Seiyu "Golden Salad-yu" (1977)
- Nisshin Seifun Group Cheesecake Mix "Koolon," "Ma Ma Spaghetti"
- Brother Industries "Brother Amiki," "Brother Mishin"
- Yamaha Motor Company Soft bike "Pasola," Small "Dinghy" (1977–80)
- Unilever Japan "Sunsilk Shampoo"
- Coca-Cola Japan "Nasuta Potato Chips"
- Imuraya Confectionery
- Kao Corporation "Kantan My Pet," "Bus Magic Lin"

== Bibliography ==
=== Photo albums ===
- "Aki Mizusawa no Jōnetsu" Gekisha Bunko (20 Mar 1986, Shogakukan, Shooting: Kishin Shinoyama) ISBN 4-093-94751-1
- Aki Mizusawa–Photography Kishin Shinoyama 1975-1995 (1 May 1995, Shogakukan, Shooting: Kishin Shinoyama) ISBN 4-093-94581-0

==== Omnibus photo albums ====
- Gekisha-135-Ri no Onna tomodachi (15 May 1979, Shogakukan, Shooting: Kishin Shinoyama)
- Masaharu Makino Joyū Kokorozashi Jō (15 Jun 1979, Kusakaze-sha)
- 20 Seiki no Venus 1966-2000 (Dec 2000, Shueisha) ISBN 4-087-80319-8
- Towa Hozon-ban Shashin-shū Heibon Punch –Yomigaere, Idol no Jidai– (24 Apr 2008, Magazine House) ISBN 4-838-71863-2

==== Internet photo albums ====
- Internet Kishin Shinoyama S Book Aki Mizusawa 1., 2., and 3. (Shogakukan, 50 pages each)

=== Books and related works ===
- Camera Gihō Nyūmon (1981, Japan Broadcasting Publishing Association) Text of the programme with the same name
- Yume mitai ni Eigo Perapera (1986, Kadokawa Shoten) ISBN 4-047-06021-6
- Piano de Pops o III (1991, Japan Broadcasting Publishing Association) Text of the programme with the same name
- Aki Mizusawa no Kosodate Rikon Wars (by Hiroshi Kosuga/1995, Schola) ISBN 4-796-20239-0
- Aki Mizusawa no Bust Up Senka (edited by Health information network/1995, Dai Seiko) ISBN 4-924-72411-4
- Aki, Julian, Frances no Homemade Eikaiwa (1999, The Masada) ISBN 4-915-97787-0
- Mare ni Miru Bakajo (Bessatsu Takarajima Real 043) (2003, Takarajimasha) ISBN 4-796-63098-8
- "Zutsū kurai" de Byōin e Ikō (by Toshihiko Shimizu/2005, MNS-Kawade Shobo Shinsha Publishers inc.) ISBN 4-309-90618-4
- Aki Mizusawa "Atatame Haramaki Diet" (by Yosuke Hisanaga/2010, Kodansha) ISBN 4-062-16310-1

== Discography ==
=== Albums ===
- Musume-gokoro (21 Sep 1973) (CBS Sony/SOLJ-84)-Same CD (SRCL-2892)-(Audition and download sales by mora)
1. Musume-gokoro
  Lyrics: Michio Yamagami/Composition: Kyōhei Tsutsumi/Arrangement: Kyōhei Tsutsumi
2. Oshibana Nikki
  Lyrics: Michio Yamagami/Composition: Kyōhei Tsutsumi/Arrangement: Kyōhei Tsutsumi
3. Anata no Koto de Ippai
  Lyrics: Michio Yamagami/Composition: Kyōhei Tsutsumi/Arrangement: Hiroshi Takada
4. Yubikiri
  Lyrics: Michio Yamagami/Composition: Kyōhei Tsutsumi/Arrangement: Kyōhei Tsutsumi
5. No no komichi
  Lyrics: Michio Yamagami/Composition: Kyōhei Tsutsumi/Arrangement: Kyōhei Tsutsumi
6. Itsumo no Eki made
  Lyrics: Michio Yamagami/Composition: Kyōhei Tsutsumi/Arrangement: Kyōhei Tsutsumi
7. Ai o Shittakara
  Lyrics: Rei Nakanashi/Composition: Kyōhei Tsutsumi/Arrangement: Hiroshi Takada
8. Dare mo Shiranai
  Lyrics: Tokiko Iwatani/Composition: Kyōhei Tsutsumi/Arrangement: Hiroshi Takada
9. Kawa o Nogiku ga
  Lyrics: Jun Hashimoto/Composition: Kyōhei Tsutsumi/Arrangement: Hiroshi Takada
10. Itsu Kara ka
  Lyrics: Tokiko Iwatani/Composition: Kyōhei Tsutsumi/Arrangement: Hiroshi Takada
11. Sayonara nante Iwanaide
  Lyrics: Jun Hashimoto/Composition: Kyōhei Tsutsumi/Arrangement: Kyōhei Tsutsumi
12. Watashi wa Wasurenai
  Lyrics: Jun Hashimoto/Composition: Kyōhei Tsutsumi/Arrangement: Kyōhei Tsutsumi
- Musume-gokoro+7–All Songs Collection (29 Sep 2015) (Sony Music Custom Made Factory/DQCL-581)-(Direct sale limited CD)

All songs from the album Musume-gokoro and released songs not included in the album are included

=== Singles ===
1. Musume-gokoro/Itsumo no Eki made (1 Jul 1973) (CBS Sony, the same above/SOLB-41)
  Lyrics: Michio Yamagami/Composition-Arrangement: Kyōhei Tsutsumi
2. Himitsu/Futari no Yuki (1 Nov 1973) (SOLB-84)
  Lyrics: Michio Yamagami/Composition-Arrangement: Kyōhei Tsutsumi
3. Atsui dekigoto/Anata no Koto de Ippai (21 Mar 1974) (SOLB-120)
  Lyrics: Kazumi Yasui/Composition-Arrangement: Kyōhei Tsutsumi
  Anata no Koto de Ippai; Lyrics: Michio Yamagami/Composition: Kyōhei Tsutsumi/Arrangement: Hiroshi Takada
4. Inori/Onomichi no Ame (21 Sep 1974) (SOLB-177)
  Lyrics: Takashi Matsumoto/Composition-Arrangement: Takashi Miki
5. Meguri Awase/Konya wa Kaette (21 Mar 1975) (SOLB-228)
  Lyrics: Rei Nakanashi/Composition-Arrangement: Takashi Miki

=== Compilations ===
- Early 70's Female Idol Collection Vol.1 (SRCL- 4230)
  - "Musume-gokoro" recording
