= Scott Pilgrim Takes Off =

American-Japanese anime television series

- Release poster
- Genre: Comedy; Action-adventure
- Based on: Scott Pilgrim by Bryan Lee O'Malley
- Developed by: Bryan Lee O'Malley; BenDavid Grabinski
- Written by: Bryan Lee O'Malley; BenDavid Grabinski
- Voices of: Michael Cera; Mary Elizabeth Winstead; Satya Bhabha; Kieran Culkin; Chris Evans; Anna Kendrick; Brie Larson; Alison Pill; Aubrey Plaza; Brandon Routh; Jason Schwartzman; Johnny Simmons; Mark Webber; Mae Whitman; Ellen Wong
- Music by: Joseph Trapanese; Anamanaguchi
- Opening theme: "Bloom" performed by Necry Talkie
- Countries of origin: United States; Japan
- Original language: English
- No. of episodes: 8

Production
- Executive producers: Marc Platt; Edgar Wright; Michael Bacall; Adam Siegel; Jared LeBoff; Nira Park; Kouhei Obara; Dylan Thomas; Eunyoung Choi; BenDavid Grabinski; Bryan Lee O'Malley
- Cinematography: Hikari Itou; Yoshihiro Sekiya
- Editor: Keisuke Yanagi
- Running time: 26–29 minutes
- Production companies: Marc Platt Productions; Complete Fiction; Faust Av; Science Saru; Universal Content Productions

Original release
- Network: Netflix
- Release: November 17, 2023

Scott Pilgrim Takes Off is an anime adventure television miniseries developed by Bryan Lee O'Malley and BenDavid Grabinski for Netflix. The series is based on the graphic novel series Scott Pilgrim by O'Malley, with the entire main cast from the 2010 film adaptation, Scott Pilgrim vs. the World, reprising their roles for the English voice cast. The series was released on November 17, 2023.

While both the film and Takes Off are inspired by the comics, this anime miniseries features a different plot wherein the titular Scott Pilgrim disappears in the first episode. The remainder of the series follows his love interest Ramona Flowers as she tries to find out who was responsible for his disappearance, all while other characters within the story work on a fictional adaptation of Scott's life. After the animated series was not renewed for a second season, a sequel video game, Scott Pilgrim EX, was released on March 3, 2026.

== Premise ==
The series, set in Toronto, Canada, serves as an alternate retelling of the original Scott Pilgrim graphic novel series and movie. Like in the original series, Scott Pilgrim, a bassist in an indie band, falls in love with Ramona Flowers, a mysterious delivery girl, attracting the attention of Ramona's seven evil exes. Things take an unexpected turn when Scott loses his battle against Ramona's first evil ex Matthew Patel and is seemingly killed. As the trajectory of everyone's lives, including those of Ramona's evil exes, changes drastically as a result, Ramona learns that Scott may still be alive and investigates his disappearance.

== Voice cast ==
All of the main English-language cast reprise their roles from the 2010 film Scott Pilgrim vs. the World.

English

- Michael Cera as Scott Pilgrim
  - Finn Wolfhard as teen/young Scott Pilgrim
  - Will Forte as Old/Even Older Scott Pilgrim
- Mary Elizabeth Winstead as Ramona Flowers and Old/Even Older Ramona Flowers
- Satya Bhabha as Matthew "Matt" Patel
- Kieran Culkin as Wallace Wells and Old Wallace Wells
- Chris Evans as Lucas Lee
- Anna Kendrick as Stacey Pilgrim
- Brie Larson as Natalie "Envy" Adams
  - Emily Haines as Envy's singing voice
- Alison Pill as Kimberly "Kim" Pine
- Aubrey Plaza as Julie Powers
- Brandon Routh as Todd Ingram
- Jason Schwartzman as Gordon "Gideon Graves" Goose
- Johnny Simmons as "Young" Neil Nordegraf
- Mark Webber as Stephen Stills
- Mae Whitman as Roxanne "Roxie" Richter
- Ellen Wong as Knives Chau
- Julian Cihi as Kyle and Ken Katayanagi
- Stefan Johnson as Announcer
- Kristina Pesic and Ingrid Hass as Sandra and Monique
- Shannon Woodward as Hollie Hawkes
- Kevin McDonald as Edgar Wrong
- Stephen Root as The Nanomachines
- Kirby Howell-Baptiste as Lucas's Agent and The Actress in a Movie Within The Show
- Griffin Newman as The Actor in a Movie Within The Show / Straight Wallace Wells / Butler / Valet
- Tony Oliver as First A.D.
- Ryan Simpkins as Slate Girl
- Nelson Franklin as The Documentarian
- Michael Bacall as Envy Fan #4
- Bowen Yang and Matt Rogers as the TV Gossips
- Simon Pegg as Security Guard #1
- Nick Frost as Security Guard #2
- Kal Penn as Matthew Patel's lawyer
- "Weird Al" Yankovic as Documentary Narrator
- Metric as themselves
- Courtney Lin and Angie Sarkisyan as the Demon Hipster Chicks

Japanese

- Hiro Shimono as Scott Pilgrim
  - Fumihiko Tachiki as Old/Even Older Scott Pilgrim
- Fairouz Ai as Ramona Flowers and Old/Even Older Ramona Flowers
- Shinji Saitō as Matthew "Matt" Patel
- Masaya Fukunishi as Wallace Wells and Old Wallace Wells
- Yūichi Nakamura as Lucas Lee
- Misato Matsuoka as Stacey Pilgrim
- Kana Hanazawa as Envy Adams
- Tomo Muranaka as Kim Pine
- Yū Kobayashi as Julie Powers
- Wataru Hatano as Todd Ingram
- Tomokazu Seki as Gordon "Gideon Graves" Goose
- Yuto Kawasaki as "Young" Neil Nordegraf
- Anri Katsu as Stephen Stills
- Naomi Ōzora as Roxanne "Roxie" Richter
- Aoi Koga as Knives Chau
- Shunsuke Takeuchi as Kyle and Ken Katayanagi
- Seiichiro Yamashita as Anime Boy
- Haruka Shiraishi as Anime Girl

== Episodes ==
No.	Title	Directed by	Storyboarded by	Original release date
1	"Scott Pilgrim's Precious Little Life"	Abel Góngora	Abel Góngora	November 17, 2023
Scott Pilgrim is the unemployed bassist of the Toronto band "Sex Bob-omb" and is dating Knives Chau, a 17-year-old high schooler. At a party, Scott meets Ramona Flowers, a girl who has repeatedly appeared in his dreams. He orders a DVD from Netflix when he learns Ramona works there as a courier and asks her out when she arrives. They get along well, unaware that they are secretly being monitored by Gideon Graves, leader of a group of Ramona's ex-partners called the League of Evil Exes, whom Scott has to defeat in order to date her. Gideon sends lowest-ranked League member Matthew Patel to kill Scott at a Sex Bob-omb show. Matthew interrupts them at the show's beginning and obliterates Scott early in their battle.
2	"A League of Their Own"	Tomohisa Shimoyama	Tomohisa Shimoyama	November 17, 2023
Ramona rejects Matthew despite his victory over Scott, blaming herself for his death. Realizing this contradicts the League's rule promising the victor's right to date Ramona, Matthew summons the six other League members to a meeting in New York City, during which Gideon reveals the League's true purpose for him to monopolize Ramona's affection. Matthew challenges Gideon for leadership of the League over his deception, which Matthew wins after a lengthy battle, forcing Gideon to relinquish control of his massive media conglomerate. Meanwhile, following Scott's funeral – which is disrupted by his ex-girlfriend, pop star Envy Adams – Ramona hears Scott's voice in her dreams and realizes he may still be alive.
3	"Ramona Rents a Video"	Moko-chan	Moko-chan	November 17, 2023
"Young" Neil Nordegraf, the roommate of Sex Bob-omb's vocalist Stephen Stills, attempts to write a screenplay after Scott's death reminds him of the fragility of life but fails to get anywhere. He wakes in the night to see a mysterious figure using the computer and finds a completed script credited to him on it the next morning. Ramona reviews security footage of the night Scott was killed, discovering that he was pulled into a portal just before Matthew struck him. Stephen's ex-girlfriend Julie Powers points her toward Sex Bob-omb drummer and Scott's ex-girlfriend Kim Pine, whom Ramona removes as a suspect when Kim expresses respect for her pursuit of Scott. Ramona is suddenly attacked by Roxie Richter, one of the Evil Exes. During their fight, Ramona apologizes for the callous way she broke up with her, and the two reconcile. A despondent Gideon approaches Julie, revealing his identity as her old classmate Gordon Goose, and she warmly welcomes him.
4	"Whatever"	Akitoshi Yokoyama	Akitoshi Yokoyama	November 17, 2023
Ramona visits Evil Ex and famous actor Lucas Lee to ask if he had anything to do with the portal. Lucas has been cast in the titular role in a film based on Neil's screenplay, Scott Pilgrim's Precious Little Life, which theorizes what could have happened if Scott beat Matthew; Scott's roommate Wallace Wells is cast as himself. Lucas and Ramona are attacked by the paparazzi when he is discovered to be dating the actress playing Knives. After a long battle that wears Lucas down, he and Ramona make up, and she sneaks him out of the studio. As his agent drops him, he confirms to Ramona that he has nothing to do with the portal. Evil Ex Todd Ingram, Envy's bandmate and boyfriend and superpowered vegan, arrives by portal to audition for Scott, leaving Ramona suspicious.
5	"Lights. Camera. Sparks?!"	Rushio Moriyama	Rushio Moriyama	November 17, 2023
As Ramona is cast as Envy's (playing Ramona) stunt double, Wallace seduces Todd. Envy makes Ramona fight Wallace's stunt doubles while he informs Todd that their affair was only a fling and he does not care about him, causing him to listlessly break the "vegan code" and lose his powers. As Envy and Ramona try to talk sense into him, the latter shows them the footage, and Envy concludes that the portal was not Todd's. Matthew, the studio's new owner, shuts down production and reveals to Ramona that Gordon is dating Julie.
6	"Whodidit"	Takayoshi Nagatomo	Mari Motohashi	November 17, 2023
Gordon befriends a jobless Lucas. Ramona confronts Julie, who explains that Gordon has been too depressed to plot anything against Scott, and as they come back to Julie's house, a robot that has been following Ramona runs out. Stephen and Knives give Matthew the idea to turn Scott Pilgrim's Precious Little Life into a play with himself playing Scott. Ramona realizes that Evil Exes, the Katayanagi twins, created the robot to be vegan and had it create the portal. Sex Bob-omb informs her that Neil didn't write the screenplay and that the file information reveals it was written fourteen years in the future. Scott turns up on Ramona's doorstep, validating her theory but claiming to have set the whole thing up himself.
7	"2 Scott 2 Pilgrim"	Kenji Maeba	Kenji Maeba	November 17, 2023
During the fight with Matthew, Scott is taken into the future by his future self, who explains that, after defeating the League, (Note: As depicted in Scott Pilgrim's Finest Hour and Scott Pilgrim vs. the World (2010).) he and Ramona got married but later divorced. He started a band with the twins, who had the robot pull Scott into the future. Aiming to erase his past pain, Old Scott refuses to take him back until he gives up on Ramona, and Scott watches Ramona's journey of trying to save him through the robot. He approaches old Ramona, who reveals that she took old Neil's memoir he wrote about them, adapted it into a screenplay, traveled back in time, and planted it on his computer. With both of them moved by Ramona's efforts, old Ramona takes Scott back to the past. After explaining this, Scott apologizes to Knives and tries to kiss Ramona, but they find a force field between their lips. Suspecting the League, they head to Matthew's play, Scott Pilgrim's Precious Little Musical.
8	"The World vs. Scott Pilgrim"	Takuya Fujikura & Takayoshi Nagatomo	Abel Góngora & Mari Motohashi	November 17, 2023
Scott and Ramona determine that none of the Evil Exes are behind the field. During the play, a deranged Even Older Scott teleports Scott, his friends, Ramona, and the League away, revealing himself as the one who created the field. Since Scott refuses to give up on Ramona, he intends to kill them all. The group fights him, but everyone is sent back except Scott and Ramona. The fight is interrupted by an older Ramona, who reveals that she still loved him when they separated but is disgusted by his current state. Ramona decides she is done running from what she loves and embraces her older self, merging and becoming "Super Ramona," who sends older Scott back to the future and successfully kisses Scott. They are returned to the play, where Gordon and Julie are caught trying to bomb the stage, but Matthew instead returns his properties, tired of the stress they cause. Matthew continues work as a stage actor, Lucas takes up work as a barista with Scott's sister Stacey, Roxie helps Todd train to maintain his vegan powers, the Katayanagi twins continue to work in robotics, Wallace finds a boyfriend in Paris after taking a vacation with his film money, Knives joins Sex Bob-omb as a keyboardist with Envy occasionally collaborating with them, and Ramona continues work as a stunt double. In a mid-credits scene, Gordon and Julie seemingly plot against Scott and Ramona, leading into Scott Pilgrim EX.

== Production ==
=== Development ===
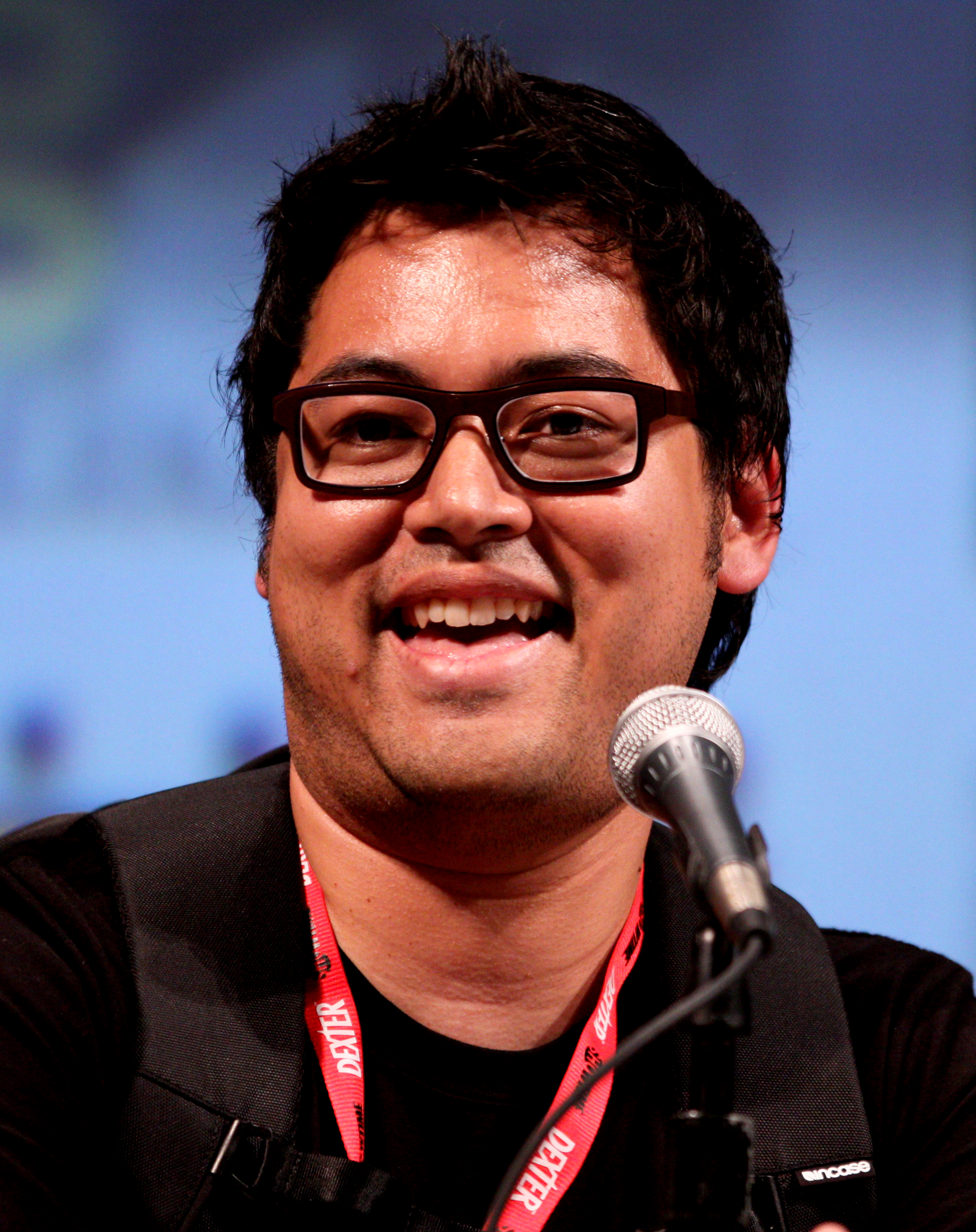
Bryan Lee O'Malley created the graphic novel series and serves as co-showrunner

In 2018, Jared LeBoff had reached out to Edgar Wright asking if he would be interested in working on a new Scott Pilgrim project. Then, in early 2019, LeBoff approached O'Malley about doing a Scott Pilgrim anime with Science Saru. O'Malley was uninterested at the time, as he didn't want to do a straight retelling of the graphic novels and had "no story or motivation". In 2020, O'Malley and Grabinski pitched a story which starts as the same story, but deviates at the fight with Patel. Universal Content Productions and Netflix greenlit the idea. In January 2022, it was reported that Netflix and UCP were developing an anime series based on the Scott Pilgrim graphic novels by Bryan Lee O'Malley; at the time, Netflix had ordered several other anime and animated projects based on popular properties. O'Malley was announced as showrunner, writer, and executive producer alongside BenDavid Grabinski, with animator Abel Góngora directing. Edgar Wright and Michael Bacall, who directed and wrote the 2010 live-action film adaptation, Scott Pilgrim vs. the World, served as executive producers. The animation was provided by Science Saru. In March 2023, it was announced that the series had officially been greenlit, with Wright noting that it expanded the Scott Pilgrim universe.

=== Casting ===
On March 30, 2023, Netflix released a cast announcement video, confirming that the cast of the 2010 film would reprise their roles. Wright had assembled the actors for the film and helped convince them all to return for the anime. He reflected that casting and working on the film was "one of the proudest and most enjoyable achievements of [his] career". They had previously reunited for 10th anniversary events, with the team reportedly excited to have another project in the Scott Pilgrim universe to create. Shota and Keita Saito, the actors who portrayed the Katayanagi twins in non-speaking roles in the film, were not mentioned in the cast announcement; it was subsequently announced that Julian Cihi would voice both twins. The production confirmed that further cast members would be announced later.

=== Writing ===
When O'Malley and Grabinski began writing the series, they wanted to capture the spirit of the comics and movie. However, they still update things in the nearly two-decades since the comic's original publication. Some of these changes include changing Ramona's job from a delivery girl for Amazon to delivering DVDs for Netflix and also expanding on the backstories of the evil exes.

=== Music ===
The series' music is composed by Joseph Trapanese and Anamanaguchi, the latter having previously composed for the film's video game adaptation. The show's opening theme, "Bloom" was performed by Japanese rock band Necry Talkie. Other songs include "What's a Girl to Do?" by Cristina, "Breathless" by X, "A-Punk" by Vampire Weekend, "You Wouldn't Like Me" by Tegan & Sara, "United States of Whatever" by Liam Lynch, "Ring of Fire" by Johnny Cash, "If You Could Read My Mind" by Stars on 54, "Sharp Dressed Man" by ZZ Top, "Kidnapped by Neptune" by Scout Niblett, "Scott Pilgrim" by Plumtree, and "Police Truck" by Dead Kennedys. The show also features covers of "I Will Remember You" by Sarah McLachlan, "Konya Wa Hurricane" by Kinuko Oomori and "Techno Syndrome" by The Immortals. The soundtrack album was released on November 17, 2023, by Lakeshore Records.

== Release ==
Wright posted on social media that its release was "imminent" on March 30, 2023, while discussing the cast. Netflix announced in August of that same year that the series would be released on November 17 and would consist of eight episodes.

The series was released on Blu-ray on March 24, 2026.

== Reception ==
On the review aggregator website Rotten Tomatoes, 96% of 50 critics' reviews are positive, with an average rating of 8.2/10. The website's consensus reads: "Retaining the heart and wit of the original movie while also carving out a fresh path for itself, Scott Pilgrim takes off in the animated medium and soars." On Metacritic, the series has a score of 82 out of 100, based on 20 reviews, indicating "universal acclaim".

Rendy Jones of RogerEbert.com praised the show saying it "shatters expectations" and "cleverly reexamines its entire story with a profound twist without sacrificing any pieces of its identity." Alison Herman of Variety magazine said it "successfully combines the innovative style and comic charm of its predecessors with a new spin that corrects for the tropes we can now see with hindsight" and notes that the show is not for children but "is meant for former kids revisiting an old favorite through more grown-up eyes."

Maya Phillips from The New York Times expressed dissatisfaction with the work, specifically targeting its narrative and humor. Phillips described the storylines as "bland" and the jokes as "lackluster".

=== Accolades ===
Award	Date of ceremony	Category	Recipient(s)	Result	Ref.
ACE Eddie Awards	March 3, 2024	Best Edited Animated Series	Keisuke Yanagi (for "Ramona Rents a Video")	Nominated	
Astra TV Awards	December 8, 2024	Best Anime Series	Scott Pilgrim Takes Off	Nominated	
Critics' Choice Awards	January 14, 2024	Best Animated Series	Scott Pilgrim Takes Off	Won (first anime series to win, and first to be nominated for, this award)	
GLAAD Media Award	March 14/May 11, 2024	Outstanding Limited or Anthology Series	Scott Pilgrim Takes Off	Nominated	
Crunchyroll Anime Awards	May 25, 2025	Best Romance	Scott Pilgrim Takes Off	Nominated	

== Sequel video game ==
In an interview with Rolling Stone, O'Malley said of the series' future that Netflix was unlikely to renew the series for a second season, stating "I never say never, but right now, it seems like it would take about 50 different miracles simultaneously for another season to happen. So we'll see." He confirmed in November 2024 that the series would not continue on Netflix.

In an interview with CBR in February 2024, Mary Elizabeth Winstead and Ellen Wong expressed that they would be happy to reprise their characters in any future Scott Pilgrim adaption, including a hypothetical sequel series to Takes Off. Winstead added that "if that creative spark is back, I think we would all be ready to tackle it again." Consequently, a sequel video game to Takes Off, Scott Pilgrim EX, was ultimately released on March 3, 2026.
