= Snotgirl =

Comic book written by Bryan Lee O'Malley and drawn by Leslie Hung

Publication information
- Publisher: Image Comics
- Format: Digest
- Genre: Magic realism Action; Fantasy; Slice-of-life; Romantic comedy Surreal comedy Dramedy
- Publication date: 2017 – present
- Main character: Lottie Person

Creative team
- Written by: Bryan Lee O'Malley
- Artist: Leslie Hung

Collected editions
- Green Hair Don't Care: ISBN 978-1-5343-0036-1
- California Screaming: ISBN 978-1-5343-0661-5
- Is This Real Life?: ISBN 978-1-5343-1523-5
- Make it Make Sense!: ISBN 978-1-5343-2991-1

Snotgirl is a series of comics created as a collaboration between writer Bryan Lee O'Malley and artist Leslie Hung. They concern Lottie Person — also known as "Snotgirl" — a fashionable social media star with severe allergies, with a mysterious supernatural plot element. The first issue was published in 2016 by Image Comics, and four collected editions have been published between 2017 and 2025. The series has been praised for its creativity, visuals, and compelling story. In 2017, O'Malley was nominated for a Joe Shuster Award in the Writer category for his work on the first five issues of the comic.

== Background ==
Snotgirl is O'Malley's first collaboration with Leslie Hung, and his first time releasing monthly comics instead of graphic novels. Both Hung and O'Malley suffer with pollen allergies, which acted as an inspiration for Lottie's own allergies. O'Malley felt inspired to make a more racially diverse story – especially one featuring mixed race characters – after noticing the lack of it in his other stories, and has spoken on how he felt he didn't see himself represented in his own work. Fashion is a long-term interest of Hung's, and she has stated that she takes fashion inspiration for a lot of the characters from magazines, blogs and Pinterest. Despite O'Malley normally working with graphic novels, the pair decided to release Snotgirl episodically to mirror the rapid social media trend cycle, and make each story seem more like a moment in time.

== Premise ==
Lottie Person is a fashion blogger struggling to juggle her influencer status with her chronic allergies and poor social life. Things quickly change for her when she meets Caroline, a beautiful girl with the same coffee order as her. The two decide to go for drinks, and this kickstarts a rapid chain of events that are beyond anything Lottie would've expected from a simple first date.

== Reception ==
Snotgirl has had a generally positive reception. CBR praised its frequent blending of fantasy and reality, and its honest depiction of the realities of adulthood; citing Hung's expressive, bubblegum-pop art style as high points. WWAC's review of the first volume also cited the art as a stand-out feature of the comic, but also commented on the way the none of the characters 'feel insignificant or interchangeable'. Snotgirl has also been commended for its range of LGBTQ+ characters, with AIPT Comics placing it number four on their list of the best queer comics of 2018. In 2019, the American Library Association included it in a list of graphic novels and comics that could be used to start discussions on social justice surrounding body image.

== Collected editions ==
Title	Material collected	Publication date	ISBN
Snotgirl, Vol. 1: Green Hair Don't Care	Snotgirl #1–5	February 22, 2017	978-1-5343-0036-1
Snotgirl, Vol. 2: California Screaming	Snotgirl #6–10	May 22, 2018	978-1-5343-0661-5
Snotgirl, Vol. 3: Is This Real Life?	Snotgirl #11–15	May 26, 2020	978-1-5343-1523-5
Snotgirl, Vol. 4: Make it Make Sense!	Snotgirl #16–20	July 8, 2025	978-1-5343-2991-1
