= Mizusawa (surname) =

Mizusawa (written: 水沢 lit. "water swamp") is a Japanese surname. Notable people with the surname include:

- Aki Mizusawa (born 1954), Japanese actress and singer
- Bert Mizusawa (born 1957), United States Army general
- Erena Mizusawa (水沢 エレナ, born 1992), Japanese model and actress
- Fumie Mizusawa (水沢 史絵, born 1980), Japanese voice actress
- Jun Mizusawa (水沢 潤, born 1966), Japanese voice actress
- Megumi Mizusawa (水沢 めぐみ, born 1963), Japanese manga artist
- Nako Mizusawa (水沢 奈子, born 1993), Japanese actress
