= Misa Yamamura =

Japanese novelist (1934–1996)

- 山村美紗
- Born: Misa Kimura; August 25, 1934; Kyoto
- Died: September 5, 1996 (aged 62)
- Education: Kyoto Prefectural University
- Spouse: Takashi Yamamura
- Writing career
- Notable awards: Kyoto Culture Award, Lifetime Achievement Honor

Misa Yamamura (山村 美紗, Yamamura Misa; née Kimura (木村); August 25, 1934 – September 5, 1996) was a Japanese novelist and a mystery writer favored as the queen of both mystery novels and tricks in Japan, often compared to Agatha Christie.

== Biography ==
Born in Kyoto, Misa Yamamura graduated from Kyoto Prefectural University Faculty of Letters, majored Japanese Literature in 1957 and was employed as a Japanese literature teacher at Fushimi Junior High School in Kyoto City until 1964 when she got married. Beginning writing since around 1967, Yamamura was nominated three times for Edogawa Ranpo Award in 1970, 1972 and 1973, and it was in 1974 when she made a major debut with "Disappeared into the Sea of Melaka" (マラッカの海に消えた, Marakkano Umini Kieta). Yamamura wrote two TV screen plays before her major debut for a very popular series of detective drama "SWAT: Special Investigation Team" (特別機動捜査隊). Those were written for Episodes 474 (co-authored with Norimasa Ogawa) and 476, both broadcast in 1970.

Among her seventy-plus novels, many were set in Kyoto, and a good number of those were used as the original works for television dramas since 1970s as well as for several theater plays. She incorporated her background into her novels as she held official instructors' license for Ikenobo flower arrangement (6th rank or Jun-kakan) and tea ceremony with a Japanese dance Natori, or an instructor allowed to hold a stage name (Hanayagi school). She appeared in a few TV drama based on her novels cast with Momiji Yamamura.

Her most enduring character was amateur detective Catherine Turner, the Japanophilic daughter of a fictional Vice President of the United States. Debuting as a Columbia senior in 1975's Coffin of Flowers (花の棺, Hana no Hitsugi), this character ultimately resettled in Japan as a fashion reporter/photographer, appearing in a total of twenty novels and dozens of short stories.

Misa Yamamura introduced herself to mystery writer Kyotaro Nishimura before her debut, and their friendship lasted till her unexpected death in 1996. Momiji, her daughter, has also been appearing in a variety of dramas based on novels by Kyotaro Nishimura as well. (Note: Yamamura's 78 titles before her death included two works left unfinished with Yamamura's death. Kyotaro Nishimura wrote and finalized an episode among Asako Sawaki series in 1997, who was not credited in the bibliographic data. Nishimura completed another unfinished title "Murder of Narihira Ariwara" (在原業平殺人事件) by expanding it and was credited as a co-author in that book.) Many years after her death, Nishimura published the biographical novel A Woman Writer (女流作家, Joryū Sakka) with a portrait picture of Misa Yamamura. In 2006, he further homaged her with his own Coffin of Flowers (華の棺, Hana no Hitsugi); originally serialized in four parts from October 27 to November 17 for weekly magazine Shūkan Asahi, it centered on the legacy of deceased mystery writer Natsuko Emoto, a fictionalization of Yamamura.

On September 5, 1996, she was found dead in the room she had used as her office in Imperial Hotel in Tokyo, due to heart failure at the age of 62 years. (Note: The official record of her death was 62 years old, while there were also reports that she was 65 years old as born in 1931. Yamamura's younger brother wrote his memory of her dated October 25, 1996 on a daily paper "Hokkaido Shimbun.") Yamamura left a will that her eldest daughter Momiji Yamamura should be given a role whoever a director produces works based on her novels for drama for television or theater. Momiji Yamamura has been providing the original plans for TV drama and theatrical works that uses her mother's novels, and it includes those episodes of two-hour TV dramas titled "Misa Yamamura, the Novelist Detective" has been broadcast since 2012, with the leading role portrayed as Misa Yamamura the novelist detective. Momiji is co-starred with the main cast Yūko Asano, who plays Misa Yamamura.

== Family ==
Her spouse is Takashi Yamamura, a painter and a retired high school teacher. Her younger brother is Hiroshi Kimura, a professor of Political Science and her daughter is Momiji Yamamura, an actress.

== Awards ==
- 1983: The Disappeared Heir (消えた相続人, Kieta sōzokunin) at the third Nihon Bungei Taishō
- 1992: the 10th Kyoto Culture Award, Lifetime Achievement Honor (第10回京都府文化賞功労賞受賞) (Note: Since 1982, the Kyoto Culture Award has honored those who have contributed and improve cultural aspects in the Prefecture to ensure the culture in its area would develop and be promoted. The Lifetime Achievement Honor will award those who had distinguished services to enhance culture in Kyoto Prefecture through their many years of cultural and artistic activities.) and the Kyoto Akebono Award (京都あけぼの賞), both as a writer (Note: Kyoto Akebono Award is an award granted by Kyoto Prefecture, and it will honor pioneering women and groups with particularly notable achievements in various fields. Kyoto Prefecture supports women to demonstrate and further their abilities.)

== Long lists ==
- 1970: Death at Keijo (京城の死, Keijou no Shi) at the 16th Edogawa Ranpo Award
- 1971: The Corpse Likes Air Conditioner (死体はクーラーが好き) (Note: Published in the Shōsetu Sandē Mainichi among those four finalists as newcomers. The due date was January 31, 1971.)
- 1972: Death Crossover (死の立体交差, Shino rittaikousa) at the 18th Edogawa Ranpo Award
- 1973: Distorted Ocean Trench (ゆらぐ海溝, Yuragu kaiko) at the 19th Edogawa Ranpo Award

== Bibliography ==
=== Serials ===
- Catherine Turner: 38 episodes キャサリンシリーズ, 1975–1995, with the first episode as The Coffin of Flowers
- Maiko Kogiku in Kyoto: 6 episodes 祇園舞妓・小菊シリーズ, November 1985 – 1995
- Akiko Ishihara, an undertaker: 5 episodes 葬儀屋・石原明子シリーズ, November 1990 – 1996
- Fuyuko Enatsu, a coroner: 8 episodes 女検視官・江夏冬子シリーズ, October 1980 – 1996
- Yumi Katayama, a private eye: 4 episodes 不倫調査員・片山由美シリーズ, June 1984–April 1994 （1986）
- Ayuko Toda, a nurse: 3 episodes 看護婦・戸田鮎子シリーズ, June 1992 – 1993
- Kayoko Ike, a woman mystery writer: 2 episodes 推理作家・池加代子シリーズ, April 1994–June 1995
- Yoko Imai, a custom inspector: 1 episode 税関検査官・今井陽子シリーズ, 1987 (Note: Yamamura's daughter Momiji passed the examination for the national tax specialist in 1984 as an undergraduate at Waseda University and worked at the National Tax Agency after she graduated.)
- Asako Yamura, a woman mystery writer, TV news caster: 1 episode 推理作家・ニュースキャスター・矢村麻沙子シリーズ, 1983
- Asako Ogawa, a female college student-hosutesu: 1 episode 女子大生ホステス・小川麻子シリーズ, May 1984
- Asako Sawaki, a woman mystery writer: 8 episodes 推理小説作家・沢木麻沙子シリーズ, May 1989 – 1994

=== Single titles ===
- Disappeared in the Sea of Melaka マラッカの海に消えた January, 1974.
- The Corpse Likes Air Conditioner 死体はクーラーが好き June, 1976
- 78 titles between October 1976 and July 1997 (unfinished)
- 3 titles published post mortem between September 1998 and December 2002.

=== Misa Yamamura Anthology ===
10 volumes published between 1989 and 1990

=== Essays ===
- Mystery of Love by Misa 美紗の恋愛推理学, 1985
- In Love with Mystery Novels ミステリーに恋をして, 1992

=== Screen plays ===
- SWAT: 2 episodes, 1970 特別機動捜査隊

Episode 474 "Chain of Blood" 血の鎖 for December 2, 1970. (Co-authored with Norimasa Ogawa.)

Episode 476 "An Odd Couple" 奇妙な男と女 for December 16, 1970.

=== Original stories ===
Manga A series of five manga books published by Akita Shoten including:

- Yamamura, Misa (April 20, 2010). コミック山村美紗ミステリー傑作選 [Selected Mystery by Misa Yamamura—Comics] (in Japanese). Vol. 1. illustrations by Akira Ootsuka, Ayumi Hattori, Eiko Hanamura, Jun Sebata, Miyuki Tokitomo, and Sota Kazamatsuri. Tokyo: Akita Shoten. ISBN 978-4253180610.

Adventure computer games

- Taito: 2 titles, 京都龍の寺殺人事件, 京都花の密室殺人事件
- Hect: 京都財テク殺人事件
- Naxat Soft: 金盞花京絵皿殺人事件
- Pack-In-Video: 京都鞍馬山荘殺人事件

Nintendo DS

- Tecmo: DS山村美紗サスペンス 舞妓小菊・記者キャサリン・葬儀屋石原明子 古都に舞う花三輪 京都殺人事件ファイル

=== Translated titles ===
- Coffin of Flowers (花の棺)
  - Yamamura, Misa (1982-08-15). 魂斷花道 [Wonderful flowers Road] (in Chinese). Translated by 嶺月. 林白出版社. ISBN 9789575934347.
  - M. Yamamura; et al. (1992). С. Голубкова (S. Golubkov) (ed.). Цветы смерти : сборник женского детектива [Flowers of death: a collection of female detective] (in Russian). СП "КВАДРАТ"., also known as "T︠S︡vety smerti: sbornik zhenskogo detektiva" (T︠S︡vety death: a collection of female detective.)
  - Yamamura, Misa (1993). Des cercueils trop fleuris [Overly Ornate Coffins] (in French). Translated by Bouvier, Jean-Christian. Arles: Philippe Picquier. ISBN 9782877301657. OCLC 63132202.
  - Yamamura, Misa (1999-04-23). Des cercueils trop fleuris [Even Coffins Bloomed] (in French). Bouches-du-Rhône: Philippe Picquier.
- The Dark Ring of Murder (黒の環状線)
  - Yamamura, Misa (1992). La Ronde noire [The Black Loop] (in French). Translated by Bouvier, Jean-Christian. Philippe Picquier. ISBN 9782877303774. OCLC 468206094.
  - Yamamura, Misa (1996). The Dark Ring of Murder. Translated by Rohmer, Robert B. Baltimore: Noble House. ISBN 978-1561672479.
- Glass Coffin (ガラスの棺)
  - Yamamura, Misa (1992). Garasu no hitsugi. Tokyo: Kōdansha. ISBN 9784334715526. (From the series of "Asako Yamura, a woman mystery writer, TV news caster"）
- Others
  - Yamamura, Misa (2014). Yaponskiy detektiv. Sluchay so studentkoy [Japanese detective. The Case of a Student] (in Russian). Vostok-Zapad, Moscow: Vostochnaya kniga. ISBN 9785787308297.

== See also ==
- Kyotaro Nishimura
- Momiji Yamamura
