= Julian Cihi =

Japanese-American actor

- ジュリアン・スィーヒ
- Born: 1986 or 1987 (age 38–39)
- Education: Brown University (BA); New York University (MFA)
- Occupation: Actor
- Years active: 2010–present
- Parent: Aki Mizusawa (mother)

Julian Cihi (Japanese: ジュリアン・スィーヒ, born 1986 or 1987) is a Japanese-American actor. He is known for his roles in Only Murders in the Building, The Tick, and High School Lover.

== Early life and education ==
Cihi was born to Guy Cihi and Aki Mizusawa in Tokyo, Japan. He has one sister.

He attended an international school and moved to New York at age 17. He studied at Brown University, where he majored in international relations and theater arts. At Brown, Cihi participated in a cappella and acted in Production Workshop shows. After graduating, he earned an M.F.A. in acting at the New York University Tisch School of the Arts.

== Career ==
In 2013, Cihi starred alongside Elizabeth Olsen in Classic Stage Company's production of "Romeo and Juliet." He originally auditioned for the role of Tybalt, but was cast as Romeo after Finn Wittrock withdrew from the role.

Cihi played Tim Kono in Season 1 of the comedy mystery series Only Murders in the Building. He would reprise his role in the second episode of Season 5 titled, "After You".

In 2023, Cihi voiced the Katayanagi Twins (Kyle and Ken) in Scott Pilgrim Takes Off.

In 2024, Cihi played Benjiro, an artist who drew art on pieces of old technology in the series The Walking Dead: The Ones Who Live.

In 2026, Cihi was cast as Mizuki, a new Overwatch support character.
