= Bryan Lee O'Malley =

Canadian cartoonist (born 1979)

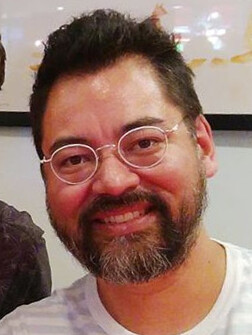
- O'Malley in 2019
- Born: February 21, 1979 (age 47) London, Ontario, Canada
- Areas: Cartoonist, Writer, Artist
- Notable works: Scott Pilgrim, Seconds
- Awards: Eisner Award; Doug Wright Award; Joe Shuster Award
- Spouse: Hope Larson (m. 2004; div. 2014)

Bryan Lee O'Malley (born February 21, 1979) is a Canadian cartoonist, best known for the Scott Pilgrim series. He also performs as a musician under the alias Kupek.

== Career ==
Bryan Lee O'Malley attended St. Thomas Aquinas Catholic Secondary School in London, Ontario, Canada. He went on to start in Film Studies at the University of Western Ontario, but dropped out before completing.

Prior to having his own material published, O'Malley illustrated the Oni Press miniseries Hopeless Savages: Ground Zero, written by Jen Van Meter. He also lettered many Oni comics, including the majority of Chynna Clugston's output between 2002 and 2005.

His first original graphic novel was Lost at Sea, released by Oni Press in 2003. Lost at Sea is a coming-of-age story about a shy 18-year-old girl named Raleigh, who believes her soul was stolen by a cat, and the road trip she takes across the United States with several teens from her school that she barely knows.

From 2004 to 2010, O'Malley worked on the six-volume Scott Pilgrim series, published by Oni Press in digest size black and white books. The series was a critical and commercial success, spawning a full-color re-release, a 2010 film adaptation, Scott Pilgrim vs. the World, a video game adaptation, a number of official soundtracks and an anime adaptation in 2023.

O'Malley created the cover art work for the 2012 video game Fez. In July 2014, his graphic novel Seconds was released by Ballantine Books. In mid 2016, O'Malley revealed the title of his next major graphic novel Worst World, which currently has no release date. He is also the co-creator of the ongoing comic book Snotgirl with Leslie Hung. He is officially billed as its writer.

== Personal life ==
O'Malley is of Korean descent from his mother's side and of Irish and French-Canadian from his father's side. In 2004, O'Malley married fellow cartoonist Hope Larson. They lived together in Toronto in 2004, Halifax in 2005, North Carolina from 2008 to 2010, and Los Angeles. They divorced in 2014.

== Awards ==
- 2005 Doug Wright Award for Best Emerging Talent
- 2005 Harvey Award nominations for Best New Talent, Best Cartoonist, and Best Graphic Album of Original Work
- 2005 Eagle Awards nomination for Favourite Comics Writer/Artist; Scott Pilgrim vs. the World nominated for Favourite Graphic Novel
- 2005 Joe Shuster Award nomination for Outstanding Canadian Comic Book Cartoonist (Writer/Artist)
- 2006 Eisner Award nomination for Best Writer/Artist: Humor
- 2006 Joe Shuster Award for Outstanding Canadian Comic Book Cartoonist (Writer/Artist)
- 2006 Scott Pilgrim Volume 2 nominated for Doug Wright Award for Best Book
- 2007 Harvey Award nomination for Best Cartoonist
- 2007 Harvey Award nomination for Best Original Graphic Novel
- 2007 Joe Shuster Award nomination for Outstanding Canadian Comic Book Cartoonist (Writer/Artist)
- 2007 National Cartoonists Society Division Awards nomination for Comic Books Award
- 2008 Scott Pilgrim Volume 3 nominated for Doug Wright Award for Best Book
- 2008 Harvey Award nomination for Best Cartoonist
- 2008 Harvey Award nomination for Special Award for Humor in Comics
- 2008 Joe Shuster Award nomination for Outstanding Canadian Comic Book Cartoonist (Writer/Artist)
- 2010 Scott Pilgrim vs. the Universe Eisner Award for Best Humor Publication
- 2010 Harvey Award Special Award for Humor in Comics
- 2010 Joe Shuster Award nomination for Outstanding Canadian Comic Book Cartoonist (Writer/Artist)
- 2010 Lulu Award for Best Female Character (Ramona Flowers)
- 2011 Harvey Award nomination for Special Award for Humor in Comics
- 2011 Harvey Award nomination for Best Original Graphic Novel
- 2011 Joe Shuster Award nomination for Outstanding Canadian Comic Book Cartoonist (Writer/Artist)
- 2015 Harvey Award nomination for Best Original Graphic Album
- 2015 Eisner Award nomination for Best Graphic Album—New
- 2015 Joe Shuster Award for Outstanding Canadian Comic Book Cartoonist (Writer/Artist)

== Bibliography ==
=== Graphic novels ===
- Lost at Sea (2003, ISBN 1-929998-71-6)
- Scott Pilgrim's Precious Little Life (2004, ISBN 1-932664-08-4)
- Scott Pilgrim vs. The World (2005, ISBN 1-932664-12-2)
- Scott Pilgrim & The Infinite Sadness (2006, ISBN 1-932664-22-X)
- Scott Pilgrim Gets It Together (2007, ISBN 9781932664492)
- Scott Pilgrim vs. The Universe (2009, ISBN 1-934964-10-7)
- Scott Pilgrim's Finest Hour (2010, ISBN 978-1-934964-38-5)
- Seconds (2014, ISBN 978-0-345529-37-4)
- Worst World (TBA)

=== Comic books ===
- Hopeless Savages: Ground Zero (drawn) (ISBN 1-929998-99-6)
- Sex Criminals #11 (variant cover art)
- Young Avengers #1 (variant cover art)
- Sacrifice #5 (variant cover art)
- The Wicked + The Divine #1 (variant cover art)
- Kaijumax #1 (variant cover art)
- Jonesy #1 (variant cover art)
- Snotgirl (written)
- Street Angel (pinup art)

=== Short stories ===
- "Lost at Sea", a two-page full-color comic in the Oni Press Color Special 2002 (Note: Later included in Lost at Sea: Tenth Anniversary Edition (2014, ISBN 978-1620101131))
- "Monica Beetle" in Project: Superior (ISBN 0-9721794-8-8)
- "Smiling Is Something That Other People Do", in The SPX 2003 Anthology (ISBN 0-9721794-3-7)

== Music ==
O'Malley is also a songwriter and musician (as Kupek) and was formerly in several short-lived Toronto bands such as Imperial Otter and Honey Dear.

- This is Intolerable (2002)
- Nameless, Faceless Compilation (2004)
- Awkward Songz (2005 (split album w/ Faux Photos))
- Before the Beginning and After the End (2006)
- B is for Bupek: Miscellany by Kupek (2007)
- Tries Again (2008)
- Good Time Singles Club (2009)
