= Geometry Wars: Retro Evolved =

2003 video game

Geometry Wars
- Developer: Bizarre Creations
- Publisher: Microsoft Game Studios
- Designer: Stephen Cakebread
- Composer: Chris Chudley
- Series: Geometry Wars
- Platforms: Original game (PGR 2 minigame): Xbox; Standalone (Retro Evolved): Xbox 360, Windows
- Release: Xbox; November 17, 2003; Xbox 360; NA: November 22, 2005; EU: December 2, 2005; AU: March 23, 2006; Windows; March 7, 2007
- Genre: Multidirectional shooter
- Mode: Single-player

Geometry Wars is a 2003 video game by Bizarre Creations. Initially a minigame in Project Gotham Racing 2, an updated version, titled Retro Evolved, was eventually released for the Xbox 360. That version holds the record for the most downloaded Xbox Live Arcade Game.

Retro Evolved was later included in the 2007 game Geometry Wars: Galaxies, the first game in the series to be released for non-Microsoft platforms.

== Gameplay ==
The object of Geometry Wars is to survive as long as possible and score as many points as possible by destroying an ever-increasing swarm of enemies. The game takes place on a rectangular playfield and the player controls a claw-shaped "ship" that can move in any direction using the left thumbstick, and can fire in any direction independently using the right thumbstick. The player also has a limited number of bombs that can be detonated and destroy all enemies on the playfield. As the game progresses, the player can earn extra lives and additional bombs at set score increments, and the primary weapon changes at regular intervals (10,000 points). Also, enemies spawn in progressively larger quantities and at greater frequency as the game progresses. If an enemy touches the player's ship, the ship explodes and a life is lost, plus the multiplier worked up by how many enemies are killed in one life is also lost. The game is over when the player runs out of lives.

The Evolved version of the game takes place on a playfield that is slightly larger than the display area of the TV screen, and the camera follows the player's movements. A background grid pattern adds to the graphical effects by warping in reaction to player shots and the behavior of certain enemies. This version introduces new enemies and a score multiplier that increases as the player destroys enemies without losing a life.

== Development ==
The game initially started out as a way for the team at Bizarre Creations to test out the Xbox controller while making Project Gotham Racing. The team included the game as an extra in the sequel not expecting very much. When the creators realized how popular the game was they decided to work on a stand-alone game for the 360's Live Arcade. For the standalone version, which eventually grew to become Retro Evolved, creator Stephen Cakebread initially wanted to make the game have a more linear structure where the players would progress through levels. However, Cakebread soon became aware of the game Mutant Storm and realized that a level-based structure would make Retro Evolved almost identical and thus decided to drop it.

The soundtrack was composed by Chris Chudley from Audioantics who created the music for all of the series up until Dimensions.

== Reception ==
Reception

Aggregate score
Aggregator	Score	
Aggregator	PC	Xbox 360
Metacritic	76/100	86/100

Review scores
Publication	Score	
Publication	PC	Xbox 360
4Players	N/A	90%
Eurogamer	7/10	9/10
GameSpot	6.7/10	8.2/10
IGN	N/A	8/10
Jeuxvideo.com	N/A	14/20
Official Xbox Magazine (US)	N/A	8.5/10
PALGN	N/A	8.5/10
PC Gamer (UK)	75%	N/A
Retro Gamer	N/A	85%
TeamXbox	N/A	8.2/10
411Mania	N/A	9/10
Detroit Free Press	N/A	4/4

Geometry Wars: Retro Evolved received "generally favorable reviews" on both platforms according to the review aggregation website Metacritic.

GameSpot's Carrie Gouskos praised the Xbox 360 version's gameplay, graphics, controls, sound effects, and its low launch price (400 Microsoft Points or $5 USD). Jeff Gerstmann criticized the PC version's gameplay being unsuitable for mouse and keyboard, lack of leaderboards, excluding the "Retro" mode featured in the Xbox 360 version, and having a higher launch price ($7.95 USD) on top of everything else.

== Sequels ==
The success of the game inspired multiple sequels: Geometry Wars: Retro Evolved 2 and Geometry Wars 3: Dimensions, as well as a spin-off titled Geometry Wars: Galaxies.

== See also ==
- GridWars, a freeware Geometry Wars clone for PC
