= PGR =

PGR may stand for:

- the stock ticker symbol for the Progressive Corporation, an American insurance company
- Patriot Guard Riders, an American organization of motorcyclists whose members attend military funeral services to prevent protestors from interfering and to honor the dead soldier
- Państwowe Gospodarstwo Rolne, a state-owned farm in communist Poland
- Philosophical Gourmet Report, a survey-based ranking of philosophy departments
- The Attorney General of Mexico (Procuraduría General de la República)
- Progressive Rail
- Project Gotham Racing, a racing video game series
  - Project Gotham Racing (video game), the second video game in the series
- Per Grazia Ricevuta, an Italian rock band with former members of Consorzio Suonatori Indipendenti
- PGR, a stage name of American composer Kim Cascone
- Project Green Reach, a science-based school outreach program that is run by the Brooklyn Botanic Garden
- Plant hormone – plant growth regulator
- Progesterone receptor, a protein
- Postgraduate research
- a television content rating level used in New Zealand (and previously used in Australia) – see TV Parental Guidelines
- Post-glacial rebound
- Punishing: Gray Raven, an action RPG game
- Palmar grasp reflex, a primite and involuntary reflex
