= Project Gotham Racing 3 =

2005 video game

- Cover art featuring a Ferrari F430
- Developer: Bizarre Creations
- Publisher: Microsoft Game Studios
- Directors: Martyn R. Chudley; Craig Cook; Philipp Teschner
- Producers: Peter Wallace; Peter O'Brien; Chris Pickford; Julie Elizabeth McGurren
- Designers: Chris Novak; Ged Talbot; Gareth Wilson
- Programmers: James Coliz; Brian Spanton
- Artist: Kiki Wolfkill
- Series: Project Gotham Racing
- Platform: Xbox 360
- Release: NA: 22 November 2005; EU: 2 December 2005; AU: 23 March 2006
- Genre: Racing
- Modes: Single-player, multiplayer

Project Gotham Racing 3 is a 2005 arcade-style racing video game developed by Bizarre Creations and published by Microsoft Game Studios as the third entry of the Project Gotham Racing series. It was released exclusively for the Xbox 360 as a launch title in November 2005. The game was rated by Official Xbox Magazine as Xbox 360 "Game of the Year" (2005), as well as "Best 1st Person (Not Shooter) of the Year", because of its realistic inside-car view. A sequel, Project Gotham Racing 4, was released in October 2007.

== Gameplay ==
Project Gotham Racing 3 offers players four cities—Las Vegas, London, New York City, and Tokyo—as well as the Nürburgring to race through. Project Gotham Racing 3 features 80 licensed cars from over 30 manufacturers such as Ferrari, Dodge, and Lamborghini.

The polygons used to make up a car model increases in Project Gotham Racing 3, to between 80,000 and 100,000. The increased polygon count allows for smoother, less jagged-shaped cars than in earlier games. Of the 80 cars in the game, 71 are unlocked and available for play at the start of a new game, while the remaining 9 (prototypes, one-offs, and concept) cars are left for the player to unlock.

Sound quality is improved from the previous game, with Bizarre dedicating a sound team to record and implement car audio in the game using the Xbox 360's new audio capabilities.

In a change from the previous two games, Project Gotham Racing 3 emphasizes supercars and special models instead of generic production cars (cars with a top speed of over 170 mph). One of the starter cars is the Acura NSX. Similar to its predecessors, each car in Project Gotham Racing 3 is allocated to a specific class. There are five classes, A through E, the high performance cars being Class A, and the low performance cars in Class E.

Kudos once again play an important part in Project Gotham. Kudos points are given for stylish driving, for example drifting around a corner, drafting, or getting two or four wheels off the ground. When combos are linked up, the player is given a bonus for keeping them linked together, and this builds up to huge amounts if the combo is held for a substantial length of time. This bonus is, however, lost if the player crashes into any barriers, though the base Kudos (all but the combo bonus) are kept.

=== Multiplayer ===
Project Gotham Racing 3 allows multiplayer offline with up to two players on one Xbox 360 console or more players via System Link. Project Gotham Racing 3 offers online integrated scoreboards for single player career events as well as Time Trials and test track times. Gamers with Xbox Live Gold are able to race with up to seven other competitors in races online. Online career (ranked) and playtime (unranked) are both offered as online multiplayer modes. Scoreboards also track standings for online career.

=== Geometry Wars ===
Project Gotham Racing 3, similar to Project Gotham Racing 2, has a secret easter egg in the garage. If you walk in the garage, there are 2 arcade cabinet's with the Demo versions of the games Geometry Wars and Geometry Wars Retro Evolved, which were available in the Xbox Live Marketplace.

== DLC content ==
In 2006, several DLCs were released:

- The entire Cadillac V-Series was made available in May as free download content.
- A speed pack was made available in April, with tournament access, new features, some fixes, and new cars.
- A style pack was made available in July, featuring more cars and features.

== Reception ==
Reception

Aggregate score
Aggregator	Score
Metacritic	88/100

Review scores
Publication	Score
Edge	9/10
Electronic Gaming Monthly	9/10
Eurogamer	8/10
Game Informer	8.5/10
GamePro	4/5
GameRevolution	B+
GameSpot	8.8/10
GameSpy	4.5/5
GameTrailers	8.5/10
GameZone	9/10
IGN	8.8/10
Official Xbox Magazine (US)	9/10
Detroit Free Press	3/4
USA Today	9.5/10

Project Gotham Racing 3 received "generally favorable" reviews according to video game review aggregator website Metacritic.

USA Today gave it a score of nine-and-a-half stars out of ten and said it "offers plenty of "oohs" and "aahs" with impressive graphics and sound. But luckily this game still plays very well too. And with a robust online package and plenty of racing options, it becomes a 360 must-have." The Sydney Morning Herald gave it four stars out of five and said that "despite Gotham's obliging nature, high-speed thrills and gorgeous graphical sheen, it's hard not to feel that we have seen its best tricks before." However, Detroit Free Press gave it a score of three stars out of four and stated that "online play is as hectic, though perhaps not as friendly, as the previous Xbox version." During the 9th Annual Interactive Achievement Awards, Project Gotham Racing 3 received nominations for "Racing Game of the Year" and "Outstanding Achievement in Online Gameplay".

Project Gotham Racing 3 received a "Platinum" sales award from the Entertainment and Leisure Software Publishers Association (ELSPA), indicating sales of at least 300,000 copies in the United Kingdom.
