= 2K Drive =

2013 video game

- Cover art for the game featuring a first generation Ford GT
- Developer: Lucid Games
- Publisher: 2K
- Producer: Dan Schmittou
- Platform: iOS
- Release: September 5, 2013
- Genre: Racing game
- Modes: Single-player, multiplayer

2K Drive is a racing video game developed by Lucid Games and published by 2K for iOS on September 5, 2013. Lucid Games had previously worked on the Project Gotham Racing series before working on 2K Drive. A Lego-themed spin-off of the game was released almost ten years later, which was titled Lego 2K Drive.

Christoph Hartmann, 2K's president at the time, stated that "2K Drive was designed to offer the most comprehensive driving simulation experience in today's [2013's] mobile market."

== Gameplay ==
2K Drive offers players a variety of gameplay modes and features. The game combines realistic physics with intuitive touch controls, allowing players to navigate through different environments and race against computer opponents or other players in multiplayer mode.

Players can choose from a selection of licensed vehicles from renowned manufacturers, which include a 2012 Ford Mustang, and a Ford GT, each with unique attributes and customization options. The game features a diverse range of tracks inspired by real-world locations, including cities, countryside, and iconic racing circuits. With stunning graphics and detailed car models, 2K Drive strives to provide a visually appealing and engaging racing experience.

A screenshot from the game, featuring a 1992 Ford Escort RS Cosworth, and a (left) 2012 Ford Focus ST

In addition to traditional races, the game offers various challenges and mini-games to keep players entertained. These include time trials, drift challenges, and obstacle courses, adding depth and variety to the gameplay. Players can earn rewards such as new cars, upgrades, and customization options by completing objectives and achieving high scores in these challenges.

2K Drive also includes social features, allowing players to connect with friends and compete against each other on leaderboards or participate in multiplayer races. With regular updates and new content, the game aims to provide long-term enjoyment for racing enthusiasts.

== Spin-off ==
A Lego-themed spin-off-sequel to the game titled Lego 2K Drive was released on May 19, 2023, for the Xbox One, Xbox Series X/S, PlayStation 4, PlayStation 5, Nintendo Switch, and Microsoft Windows.

The game was developed by Visual Concepts instead of Lucid Games. The game also supports two player split-screen, and six player online play.

== Reception ==
Reception

Aggregate score
Aggregator	Score
Metacritic	66/100

Review scores
Publication	Score
4Players	47%
Edge	5/10
Eurogamer	6/10
Pocket Gamer	3.5/5
TouchArcade	4/5
Digital Spy	3/5

The game received "mixed or average" reviews according to the review aggregation website Metacritic.

TouchArcade rated the game 4/5 stars. Also stated that "Despite having to wade through some arguably murky IAP waters, 2K Drive is a ton of fun. It would have been a much stronger experience if it was just a premium game out of the gate, but despite a ton of confusion as to how you're supposed to actually unlock all the content, racing fans will most likely enjoy it."

Martin Robinson at Eurogamer stated that "2K Drive could have been something special, but it's missing the guiding hand Lucid needed to take it beyond half-heartedly evoking memories of old."

Peter Willington at Pocket Gamer rated the game 3.5/5 stars. Also stated that "If the atrocious menus and frequent crashes were eliminated, I'd argue that 2K Drive represents the finest racing experience you can find on mobile. Because of the technical issues and unfortunate UI design, however, it just misses out on an podium finish."
