= Silverfish (video game) =

2010 video game

- Developer: Chaotic Box
- Publisher: Chaotic Box
- Platform: iOS
- Release: November 9, 2010
- Genre: Action game
- Mode: Single-player

Silverfish is an action game developed and published by Canadian indie studio Chaotic Box and released on November 9, 2010 for iOS.

It received positive reception from critics, who praised its design and graphics.

== Gameplay ==
The player controls the eponymous "silverfish", which must destroy hordes of other stylized alien bugs. The player is totally weaponless and must touch energy orbs that explode on contact, destroying all the enemies in the vicinity. There are 3 play modes, Reaper, Scavenger and Onslaught. In the first, enemies mimic the player's movements. In the second, enemies follow preset patterns on screen, while in the last, there is a wider array of enemies and the player only gets a small number of lives.

== Reception ==
Reception

Aggregate score
Aggregator	Score
Metacritic	83/100

Review scores
Publication	Score
Eurogamer	8/10
GamePro	5/5
IGN	8.5/10
Pocket Gamer	4/5

The game received "favorable" reviews according to the review aggregation website Metacritic.

Levi Buchanan of IGN called the game a "shooter-dodger-exploder" and said that it was a "fantastic twitch game for your iPhone". Keith Andrew of Pocket Gamer called it "intense" and "challenging", and recommended it for people who liked twitch-style games. Kristan Reed of Eurogamer said it was a twist on Geometry Wars 2's Pacifism mode, saying the game was "excellent" but held back by "minor design quirks".
