= James Bond 007: Blood Stone =

2010 video game

- Developers: Bizarre Creations (Note: Additional work by Virtuos, Treyarch, High Moon Studios, Radical Entertainment, Eurocom, United Front Games, Activision Shanghai, Activision Central Studios and Demonware.) n-Space (DS)
- Publisher: Activision
- Director: Jeff Lewis
- Producer: Nick Davies
- Designer: Matt Cavanagh
- Programmers: Chad Wright; Mark Craig; Oscar Cooper
- Artist: Neil Thompson
- Writer: Bruce Feirstein
- Composer: Richard Jacques
- Series: James Bond
- Platforms: Microsoft Windows; Nintendo DS; PlayStation 3; Xbox 360
- Release: NA: 2 November 2010; AU: 3 November 2010; EU: 5 November 2010
- Genre: Third-person shooter
- Modes: Single-player, multiplayer

James Bond 007: Blood Stone is a 2010 third-person shooter video game developed by Bizarre Creations and published by Activision for Microsoft Windows, Nintendo DS, PlayStation 3 and Xbox 360. It is the 24th game in the James Bond series and is the first game since James Bond 007: Everything or Nothing to have an original story, set between Quantum of Solace (2008) and Skyfall (2012). The game was released on 2 November 2010 in North America and on 5 November 2010 in Europe. Activision's remake of GoldenEye 007 was released on the same day respectively in each region. Blood Stone features the voices and likenesses of Daniel Craig, Judi Dench and Joss Stone.

The game received mixed reviews from critics upon release. It was also the final game developed by Bizarre Creations as the studio was closed just a few months later on 18 February 2011. Critics praised the game's production value, visuals, soundtrack, setting, and characterization, while receiving criticism regarding the game's length, story, and mission design. The game was nominated for several awards during the Spike Video Game Awards 2010, 7th British Academy Games Awards, GoldSpirit Awards 2010, and International Film Music Critics Association Awards by International Film Music Critics Association, winning the Best Original Composition (Video Games) Award at Music + Sound Awards in 2012. A sequel, developed by Raven Software, was reportedly planned but never produced, most likely due to Blood Stone's poor sales upon release. The game was delisted from digital platforms in 2013 along with the other 3 Activision published James Bond games due to licensing issues after the financial failure of 007 Legends.

== Gameplay ==
Blood Stone is a third-person shooter game with elements of hand-to-hand combat similar to games like Uncharted, Gears of War and Tom Clancy's Splinter Cell and with an elements of stealth, similar to Splinter Cell: Conviction, Blood Stone has a "Focus Aim" system that lets you accurately shoot enemy which is unlocked by taking an enemy with melee combat. Driving sequences also appear in the game. There is a multiplayer mode consisting of up to 16 players that will pit spies versus mercenaries. Alongside team deathmatch and other standard game modes there are massive objective-based battles where players have to work as a team to attack or defend various spy-themed goals. The player pilots several vehicle types throughout the course of the game.

== Plot ==
In 2010, MI6 uncovers a plot by international terrorist Greco (Luis Soto) to conduct a suicide attack on the G-20 leaders, while attending a summit at the Acropolis structure in Athens. M (Judi Dench) assigns James Bond (Daniel Craig) to prevent the attack. After Greco flees from his personal yacht, Bond pursues him through Athens, before learning that he rigged an SUV with explosives. After deciding to let Greco leave alive, Bond pursues after the SUV in a commandeered Aston Martin DBS V12, disabling it before it can reach the G-20 summit.

The following morning, M contacts Bond with news that Malcolm Tedworth (Timothy Watson), a researcher who disappeared while conducting top-level work for the Ministry of Defence, has been located in Istanbul. Suspecting he was kidnapped for his research, Bond is assigned to recover both Tedworth and his work. Finding the researcher being held at a construction site, Bond witnesses Tedworth being interrogated by a courier named Bernin (Ramon Tikaram), who seeks access to his USB drive containing his research. After acquiring what he needs, Bernin executes Tedworth and flees across the city, prompting Bond to pursue after him using an Aston Martin DB5. Unable to recover the data as it is fenced, Bond interrogates Bernin before killing him, learning he works for businessman Stefan Pomerov (Laurence Possa). Sent by M to Monaco, Bond works with fellow MI6 agent Nicole Hunter (Joss Stone) to find evidence at one of Pomerov's casinos.

The pair find information that Pomerov has frequented a disused chemical refinery he owns in Siberia, receiving a tip off it is storing bio-weapons, and head out to investigate it. The pair soon discover Pomerov is operating a bio-factory that is manufacturing bio-weapons, prompting them to destroy it. Discovering Pomerov intends to smuggle out bio-weapons he already has, Bond pursues after him to an ekranoplan. Boarding it before it takes off, Bond kills Pomerov and secures the bio-weapons for disposal by Russian troops. After he parts way with Nicole, Bond becomes suspicious of the tip off they received when he reports to M, suspecting it was arranged to secure Pomerov's elimination. Using Bernin's phone that he took, Bond has MI6 trace a number he had received that wasn't a local call. The call turns out to come from Chinese intelligence officer General Ping (David K.S. Tse), who contacts Bond for a meeting in Bangkok to discuss the reason for his communication with Bernin. (Note: In the Nintendo DS version, this occurs at the end of an exclusive level set in Geneva after the destruction of the refinery, in which Bond is captured in a corporate complex he spied in to look for clues about who was trying to contact Bernin.)

Meeting at an aquarium, Ping reveals he was investigating a freelance mercenary named Rak (James Goode) who operates in Bangkok and sells stolen information and technology on the black market. Ping suspects him involved in Tedworth's kidnapping, but before he can reveal more, an assassin kills him. Bond attempts to pursue the assassin, only for them to die in an accident. Needing background information from M on Rak while pursued by police, Bond is sent to meet with Silk (Richard Dillane), an associate of Rak's, who provides the location for his hideout in the city. However, Silk betrays Bond after the meeting, allowing him to be ambushed by Rak. Taken to a prison camp in Burma for interrogation by Rak, Bond escapes and pursues after him for information that results in a confrontation over a dam. Although Rak pleads for his life in exchange for his employer's identity, Bond reveals he already knows and kills him.

Returning to Monaco, Bond sends Rak's knife to Nicole, identifying her as a double agent in MI6 and the head of a group that kidnaps prominent researchers, selling their data to interested parties. (Note: The knife's design as a piece of jewelry, including its incorporation of a small titular heliotrope, is determined by Bond to be evidence that Nicole, who previously told him that she was a jewelry and fashion designer, crafted it and was allied with Rak.) Frightened, Nicole decides to escape the city and country in her Koenigsegg CCXR, only to find herself being pursued by Bond (in his Aston Martin DBS V12), who ultimately corners her on the Millau Viaduct in neighbouring France. Confronted by him, after suspecting she supplied the tip-off on Pomerov, Nicole reveals she works for an unknown man who is rich and powerful, but refuses to identify him, claiming he is bigger than any organisation in the world. Before Bond can interrogate her more, an unmanned drone shoots Nicole dead. With no further clues to follow, Bond reports in to M, advising her to find a new contact in Monaco, before departing.

=== Cast ===
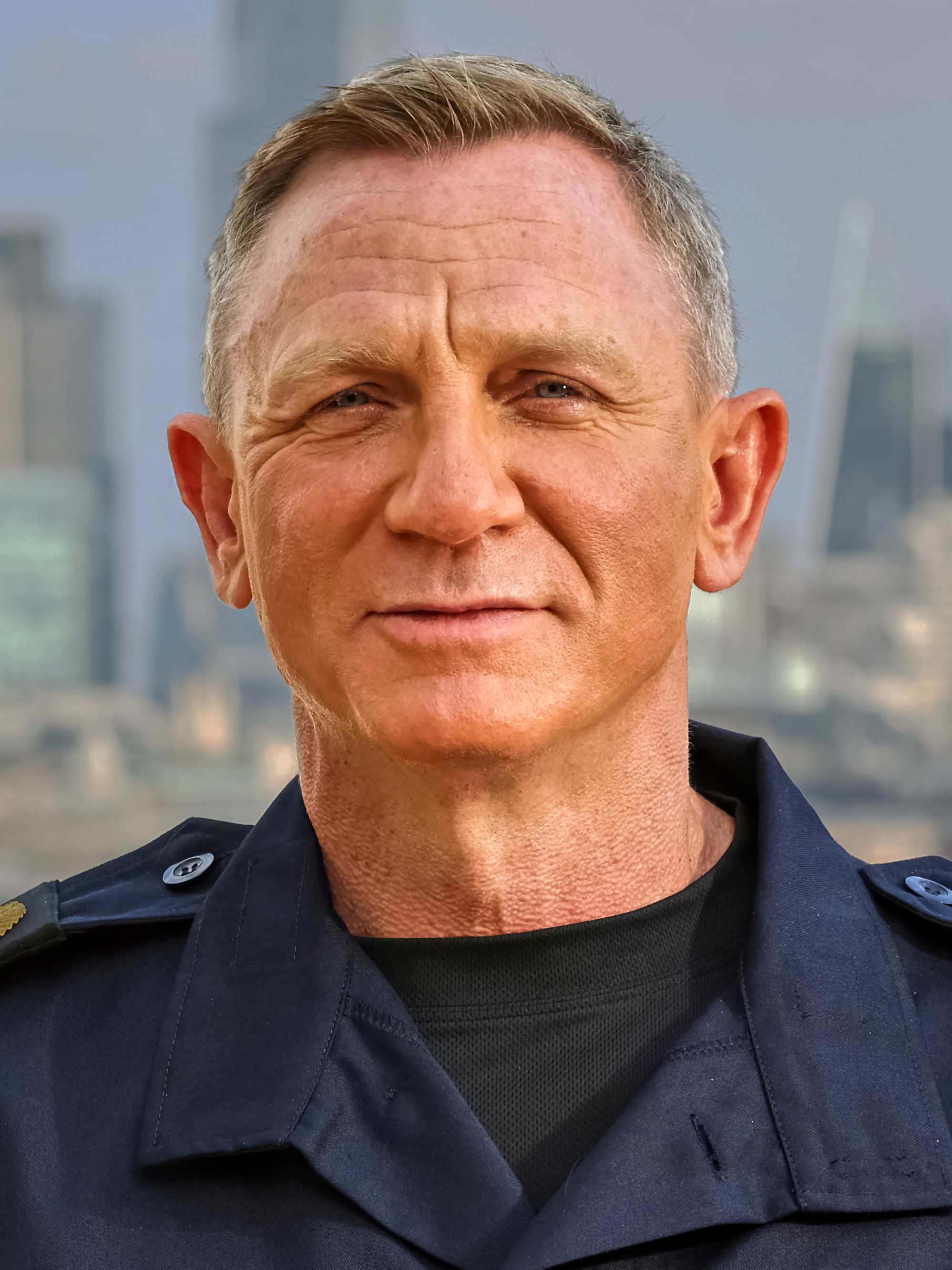
Daniel Craig portrayed the main character, James Bond

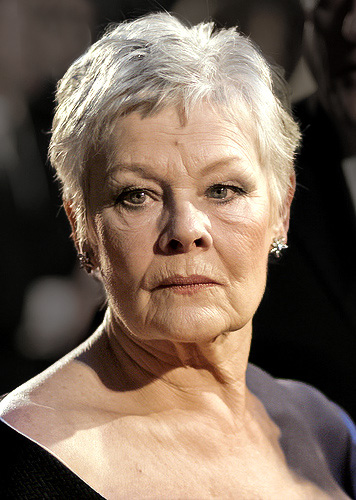
Judi Dench portrayed the MI6 head M

Recurring characters:

- James Bond – likeness and voice of Daniel Craig
- M – likeness and voice of Judi Dench
- Bill Tanner – voice only by Rory Kinnear

Other characters:

- Joss Stone as Nicole Hunter
- Luis Soto as Greco
- Timothy Watson as Malcolm Tedworth
- Ramon Tikaram as Bernin
- Laurence Possa as Stefan Pomerov (credited as Laurentiu Possa)
- David Tse as General Ping
- Richard Dillane as Silk
- James Goode as Rak

== Development ==
Blood Stone was developed by Bizarre Creations with assistance by n-Space on Nintendo DS platform. The game was hinted at on 21 April 2010 when British store HMV listed Blood Stone as "coming soon". On 23 April, Activision reserved a web domain name called bloodstonegame.com. The game was announced in an Activision press release on 16 July. James Bond film writer Bruce Feirstein wrote the story for the game. The game itself is built on developer Bizarre Creations' Bespoke engine, which was created for the game The Club. Ben Cooke, who is Daniel Craig's stunt double in the films, provided the motion capture choreography for Bond's digital animation and is credited as the game's stunt coordinator.

While Bizarre Creations was finishing development on The Club, they were bought by Activision, who had a license agreement at the time to make video games based on James Bond. Activision allowed the team to move forward with an original title, in order to take advantage of the gap between Quantum of Solace and a then-untitled follow up film, which was later revealed as Skyfall and released in 2012. Bizarre had creative control over the title, letting them design the locations and gameplay the way they wanted. Blood Stone was designed to capture the feel of a blockbuster movie with a "mix of characterization and adrenaline". The driving parts were mostly placed at the end of the chapters, as the developers were trying to make sure they wouldn't be seen as disconnected from the rest of the game.

The game's soundtrack was composed by Richard Jacques. Joss Stone provides an original musical track to the game titled "I'll Take It All", written and performed by her and David A. Stewart.

== Release ==
Blood Stone was confirmed to be released on 2 November 2010 in North America, on 3 November 2010 in Australia, and on 5 November 2010 in Europe. Also in this day, Activision also confirmed the same date release of GoldenEye 007 remake for DS and Wii.

== Reception ==
Reception

Aggregate score
Aggregator	Score
Metacritic	NDS: 70/100; PS3: 65/100; PC: 63/100; X360: 62/100

Review scores
Publication	Score
1Up.com	B−
Destructoid	5.0/10
Edge	5.0/10
Eurogamer	5.0/10
Famitsu	30/40
Game Informer	7.5/10
GameSpot	7.5/10
GamesRadar+	3/5
Giant Bomb	3/5
IGN	5.0/10; 7.0/10 (NDS)
Joystiq	4/5
Official Xbox Magazine (US)	6/10
PC Gamer (US)	5.4/10
The Guardian	2/5
VentureBeat	7.5/10
VideoGamer.com	5.0/10
The Escapist	4/5
The Telegraph	7.0/10

James Bond 007: Blood Stone received "mixed or average reviews", according to review aggregator Metacritic. Critics generally praised the game's production values, characterization, soundtrack, and visuals, but had mixed opinions regarding the game's story, mission design, and length. The Escapist wrote Blood Stone was "a satisfying action game", saying "The game had enough "wow" moments to please even the jaded Bond fan-slash-gamer crowd. Clocking in at somewhere between 8–10 hours for the main story, it nevertheless delivers the goods where it counts and manages to offer a variety of experience and emotion that makes it feel much longer."

Michael Murdock of Joystiq gave Blood Stone a review of 4 out of 5 stars, stating "Blood Stone has everything you want out of a James Bond adventure video game. It's not tied to a film, but think of this as more of a Bond adventure when he's on vacation; a fun, action-packed ride, but not necessarily cool or clever enough to warrant a cinematic adventure." IGN called it "not a bad game: it's just a painfully average one. There aren't any majorly broken elements to it, but just because this Stone is relatively polished, doesn't make it a gem." The Telegraph gave the game a positive review, saying "At about five hours long, Blood Stone isn't big, nor is it particularly clever. But it is fun, in a 'shoot anything that moves' kind of way. You'll be trammelled down corridors, blasting away at hundreds of gun-wielding goons. You'll enjoy the slick, if hardly fresh, stop-and-pop cover gunplay. And you'll find great success in many missions by activating computers and turning valves."

Destructoid summarized it by saying "An Exercise in apathy, neither solid nor liquid. Not exactly bad, but not very good either. Just a bit 'meh,' really." Game Informer praised the game's concept, soundtrack, and replay factor, but cited the graphics and gameplay as middling points in the experience, writing that "Bizarre clearly set out to make Blood Stone feel like a part of Bond's movie canon, and it's certainly successful on that front. The weapons are anemic, and the driving sections can be dodgy, but it delivers a dose of spectacle and intrigue worthy of the character." Writing about the single-player campaign, Dan Whitehead of Eurogamer said that the "Story they tell certainly resembles a Bond movie from a distance, but the moment-to-moment gameplay fails to capture his essence, so eager is it to lead you by the hand and hurry you along to the next room of dim-witted henchmen." Regarding the multiplayer component, he added by writing that "Like the single-player offering, it's thoroughly adequate but adds little of value to the overall experience."

VentureBeat considered the game above average, but criticized its lack of originality and self-identity, saying that "Other than several things in the game that don't work as well as you would expect, the game is well above average. It was fun to play and very reminiscent of previous Bond games and movies." At GameSpot, Shaun McInnis had different thoughts, stating: "The game has solid shooting mechanics and slick melee combat; Driving sections are a blast; Great production values; Globe-trotting story allows for lots of environmental variety", but criticized its initial slowness during the prologue.

In the years since Blood Stone's release, the game underwent critical re-evaluations and was highlighted as one of the best James Bond games. In September 2021, Den of Geek ranked the game as the eighth best game in the James Bond franchise to date. In November 2021, Screen Rant ranked the game as the third best James Bond game to play before the release of the new James Bond game.

=== Sales ===
In the United Kingdom, the game debuted at No. 18 on the charts, five positions below GoldenEye 007 for Wii and DS, which was released alongside Blood Stone on the same week. During its first month in Europe, the game sold approximately 176,907 copies. In the United States, Blood Stone has only sold 104,540 across all platforms in the same period.

=== Accolades ===
Year	Award	Category	Result	Ref
2010	GoldSpirit Awards	Best Original Video Game Score	Nominated	
2010	Spike Video Game Awards	Best Original Score	Nominated	
2010	Spike Video Game Awards	Best Graphics	Nominated	
2010	Spike Video Game Awards	Best Performance by a Human Male (Daniel Craig as James Bond)	Nominated	
2010	Spike Video Game Awards	Best Performance by a Human Female (Judi Dench as M)	Nominated	
2011	British Academy Games Awards	Original Music	Nominated	
2011	International Film Music Critics Association	Best Original Score for a Video Game or Interactive Media	Nominated	
2011	Ivor Novello Awards	Best Original Video Game Score	Nominated	
2012	Music + Sound Awards	Best Original Composition (Video Games)	Won	

=== Abandonment ===
On 4 January 2013, Activision removed all of its digital James Bond titles from sale with no advance notice. These included James Bond 007: Blood Stone and all other James Bond games published by the company. Activision's license of the James Bond property from MGM and EON was established in 2006 and was due to expire in 2014. However, given the broad delistings in early 2013 it has been speculated that their license was revoked rather than allowing it to run to term.

== Cancelled sequel ==
In December 2010, it was reported that a new James Bond game was in development by Activision, planned as a sequel to Blood Stone, with art materials and an uploaded video showing a gameplay trailer being leaked shortly after the report. Developed by Raven Software, the game was codenamed 007: Risico, being based on Ian Fleming's short story “Risico” with the plotline expanded and involved with other unseen elements from James Bond novels written by Ian Fleming himself. 007: Risico should have been released during Christmas 2010, if Blood Stone had been released (as originally planned) in 2009. Due to low sales of Blood Stone, along with financial problems at MGM, the game was scrapped.
