= I Maed a Gam3 w1th Z0mb1es 1n It!!!1 =

2009 video game

- Developer: Ska Studios
- Publishers: Ska Studios (Xbox Live); Microsoft Studios (Windows Phone)
- Designer: James Silva
- Programmer: James Silva
- Artist: James Silva
- Composer: James Silva
- Platforms: Xbox 360, Windows Phone 7, Windows, Linux, Xbox One, Xbox Series X/S
- Release: Xbox 360; August 16, 2009; Windows Phone 7 November 29, 2011; Windows, Linux; November 11, 2021; Xbox One, Series X/S; October 31, 2022
- Genre: Multidirectional shooter
- Modes: Single-player, multiplayer

I Maed a Gam3 w1th Z0mb1es 1n It!!!1 (stylized in all caps, also referred to as I Made a Game With Zombies in It!) is a 2009 zombie-themed multidirectional shooter game developed by Ska Studios and produced by company founder James Silva, previously best known for the Xbox Live Arcade game The Dishwasher: Dead Samurai (2009). Gameplay follows the player shooting droves of attacking zombies until the background music ends. It was developed in two weeks using Microsoft XNA. The title makes excessive comic use of features of Internet writing, such as leetspeak, overuse of exclamation marks, and typographical errors. It was released for Xbox 360 through the Xbox Live Indie Games service in August 2009.

I Maed a Gam3 w1th Z0mb1es 1n It!!!1 received positive reviews from video game journalists for its quirky sense of humor and theme song. IGN compared the mechanics to Geometry Wars, while Gametripper compared the spaced-out musical moments to Asteroids. It was the most popular Xbox Live Indie Game of 2009 and won the Inside Gaming Award for Best Indie Game. By 2010, it had sold 308,000 copies. The game was re-released on Steam in November 2021 and the Xbox Store in October 2022.

== Gameplay ==
Gameplay, which is viewed top-down, uses two analog sticks to control the characters' movement and shooting. Four players (highlighted with blue, red, yellow, and green) fight off the droves of attacking zombies while collecting power-ups (highlighted red).

I Maed a Gam3 w1th Z0mb1es 1n It!!!1 is a multidirectional shooter game for one to four players, who view the gameplay from an overhead perspective. By using two analog sticks, players shoot droves of attacking zombies while collecting power-ups, extra lives, and types of weapons that include machine guns, shotguns, and flamethrowers. Defeating zombies increases a player's total score. Players must survive for the duration of the background song, a 13 minute and 37 second rock–style song sung by Silva.

== Development and release ==
I Maed a Gam3 w1th Z0mb1es 1n It!!!1 was developed by James Silva using the Microsoft XNA tool. As a teenager, Silva learned how to make games by taking a Visual Basic class in community college. He continued making DirectX games in Visual Basic 6 until XNA launched. Silva then switched to the C# programming language. When he learned of the $1 price point for Xbox Live indie games, it inspired him to make "a $1 experience that delivers." The development spanned two weeks. In an interview with DigitalSpy, Silva stated that he was not anticipating it to be as successful as it was, and he was "half-expecting it to fail for being too stupid of a game, but I think the exact opposite thing happened."

I Maed a Gam3 w1th Z0mb1es 1n It!!!1 was released on August 16, 2009, for the Xbox 360. The developer made its song available for download on its website soon after. A version for the Windows Phone, entitled Z0MB1ES!!1 (on teh ph0ne) [sic] was released in 2011. In 2014, a spiritual successor titled TIME VIKING!!!!!ANDSPACERAPTOR [sic] was released for the Xbox 360. A re-release of the original game was published to Steam in November 2021 and the Xbox Store in October 2022.

== Reception ==
I Maed a Gam3 w1th Z0mb1es 1n It!!!1 became a favorite with critics and was noted for its quirky sense of humor and theme song. Erik Brudvig of IGN wrote that it was extremely entertaining and "somehow about as insane as its title." He further stated that the mechanics are "as simple as any twin-stick shooter like Geometry Wars." IGN staff ranked it the best independent game of 2009, and Xbox Live Director Larry Hryb ranked it at the peak of his "Top Indie Game" of 2009 list.

"I Maed a Gam3 w1th Z0mb1es 1n It!!!1"
Critics praised the theme song for its sense of humor and self-referentiality.

Reviewers praised its music; Matt Gardner of Gametripper called the featured song "one of the greatest songs to feature in a game", adding it spaced-out musical moments were a homage to the game Asteroids. Destructoid praised it, calling it quite simply and hilarious. Retroware called it "the best song and one I will never grow tired of." A version of the song was released through the Rock Band Network about a year after its release.

Destructoid's Conrad Zimmerman praised its creativity, noting that such imaginative titles are rare and "highly welcome" to the industry. He criticized that in multiplayer, "Due to the field of play being so large, as players move away from each other the display zooms out to accomodate [sic] everybody onscreen." Zimmerman gave a score of 9.5/10. Juno Stump of Retroware said "[Silva] unknowingly created a meme" and that it "perfectly preserved in its time with everything from its overuse of typographical errors to its use of leetspeak."

By January 2010, the title had become the most popular and top-selling Xbox Live Indie Game. I Maed a Gam3 w1th Z0mb1es 1n It!!!1 went on to sell 308,000 copies by August 2010, making Ska Studios roughly $140,000. It won the 2009 Inside Gaming Award for Best Indie Game.
