= GridWars =

2005 video game

GridWars or GridWars 2 (stylized as |g|ridwars) is a video game inspired by Bizarre Creations' Geometry Wars by Canadian developer Marco Incitti. The first version of the game was released as freeware on December 21, 2005 on Marco Incitti's Blitz Creations website.

Although other freeware games similar to Geometry Wars exist, GridWars eventually became so popular that Bizarre emailed Incitti and asked him to take the game down, citing that they were "beginning to feel the Geometry Wars clone's effects on our sales via Microsoft now and are beginning a process to begin to more robustly protect our copyright and intellectual property". The link to the download was pulled from the site on August 8, 2006. The game was subsequently released on a German website dedicated to Flash and freeware games and is available for Windows, OS X and Linux.

Unlike Geometry Wars which eventually plateaus in difficulty facilitating high scores in the range of hundreds of millions of points, GridWars 2 has an exponentially increasing difficulty curve. Eventually, the enemy spawn sites become so large that they nearly envelop the entire grid.

Another important difference from Geometry Wars is the ability to "farm" black holes. Besides distracting and swallowing enemies, the black holes can net points (and thus bombs/lives) based on the square of the number of enemies they have swallowed.
