= Geometry Wars: Galaxies =

2007 video game

- Developers: Bizarre Creations; Kuju Entertainment
- Publisher: Vivendi Games (Note: Released under the Sierra Entertainment brand name)
- Designer: Stephen Cakebread
- Series: Geometry Wars
- Platforms: Nintendo DS, Wii
- Release: NA: November 20, 2007 (Wii); NA: November 27, 2007 (DS); EU: January 18, 2008; AU: February 7, 2008
- Genre: Multidirectional shooter, Third Person Shooter
- Modes: Single-player, multiplayer

Geometry Wars: Galaxies is a multidirectional shooter video game developed by Bizarre Creations and Kuju Entertainment, and published by Vivendi Games for the Wii and Nintendo DS in 2007. As the first Geometry Wars game to be released on non-Microsoft platforms, Galaxies is a spin-off of Geometry Wars, which was originally included as a bonus game within Project Gotham Racing 2 on Microsoft's Xbox console. This updated version includes a single-player campaign mode, several multiplayer modes, Geometry Wars: Retro Evolved (previously released on the Xbox Live Arcade online service), and support for online leaderboards. The Wii version supports widescreen and 480p progressive scan display.

The soundtrack was composed by Chris Chudley from Audioantics who created the music for all of the Geometry Wars series.

== Gameplay ==
The object of Geometry Wars: Galaxies is to survive as long as possible and score as many points as possible by destroying a constant, generally increasing swarm of enemies. The game takes place in a closed, two-dimensional playfield, and the game ends when the player loses his/her last life. The player controls a claw-shaped "ship" that can move and fire simultaneously in any direction, with movement and firing being controlled independently via the Wii and DS' unique motion controls. A limited supply of screen-clearing bombs are available at the press of a button to instantly eliminate all enemies and missiles in an emergency. The Wii version utilizes the Wii Remote pointer and buttons to aim and fire, while assigning movement and bombs to the Nunchuk's analog stick and buttons respectively. An alternate control scheme based on the Classic Controller is available, mimicking the original twin-stick control of the original Geometry Wars, in which bombs are deployed with shoulder buttons. The DS version allows players to use the directional pad, face buttons and/or the touchscreen to move and aim, while using shoulder buttons to deploy bombs.

In addition to the updated control schemes, Galaxies introduces new enemies, multiplayer support, and several changes to the scoring system.

=== Galaxies mode ===
Galaxies is the game's main mode, which presents the player with a series of ten solar systems, each with a number of different planets featuring different challenges or styles of play. All of the enemies from Retro Evolved appear in Galaxies, along with some new enemies with a variety of different behaviours.

Some planets play very similarly to Geometry Wars: Retro Evolved, while others introduce moving obstacles, narrow tunnels, enemy carriers that split into smaller enemies when destroyed, and other gameplay mechanics. Most levels start the player with three lives and three bombs, but some require the player to play with only one life and/or no bombs, and the player may not be able to earn extra lives or bombs in those levels. Each planet sets a Bronze, Silver and Gold score level, challenging the player to reach those scores before running out of lives. Bonus Geoms are awarded for earning each medal for the first time.

Most enemies in Galaxies mode will drop one or more yellow items when destroyed. Each of these items represents a quantity of Geoms, which are dropped in amounts of 10, 25, 50, and 100. Geoms serve a variety of purposes to the player: In the game, collecting a Geom container increases the score multiplier by one, up to a maximum of 150. The player is also awarded extra lives and bombs (except in certain levels) for collecting set quantities of Geoms. Once a game ends, the collected Geoms are added to the player's total, and can then be used to unlock drone behaviors and to unlock new galaxies and the planets within them.

An automated drone follows the player around each level, executing one of eight behaviors that the player can select from before starting the level. These behaviors include "Attack", which causes the drone to fire in the same direction as the player, "Defend", in which the drone fires opposite the player, "Collect", in which the drone zips around to collect Geoms as they are dropped, and "Bait", where the drone lures enemies away from the player. Each behavior aside from the default "Attack" must be unlocked by spending Geoms, and each behavior also "levels up" over time as the player uses it, increasing the drone's speed, power and/or accuracy.

The game keeps a table of high scores for each planet, as well as a cumulative high score per galaxy and across the game as a whole. Players can also upload their scores to a global online leaderboard via the Nintendo Wi-Fi Connection service.

=== Other modes ===
Galaxies offers several modes of multiplayer play. In Cooperative mode, two players each control their own ship but share the same score, multiplier, bombs and lives. Simultaneous mode plays similarly, except that each player has their own score and lives, and the players compete to achieve the higher score. The DS version includes an extra Versus mode, in which one player controls the ship and the other player spawns enemies to try to destroy it. In all multiplayer modes the support drone is not available, and if the players move toward opposite ends of the screen, the camera zooms out to keep them both in the frame.

The Nintendo DS and Wii editions of Galaxies can connect to one another wirelessly, allowing players to unlock an additional Galaxy to play in both versions. Both editions of the game can also transfer a version of Galaxies to a Nintendo DS via its Download Play feature. Retro Evolved is included in both editions of the game, allowing the player to play the game as it was released on Xbox Live Arcade (minus Achievements and Retro mode). Retro Evolved also supports an online leaderboard feature.

== History ==
Geometry Wars: Galaxies was announced in the July 2007 edition of Nintendo Power. Developed by Kuju Entertainment, the game was released in North America in November 2007. Both Wii and DS versions were released in Europe on January 18, 2008, and in Australia on February 7, 2008.

== Reception ==
Reception

Aggregate score
Aggregator	Score	
Aggregator	DS	Wii
Metacritic	79/100	80/100

Review scores
Publication	Score	
Publication	DS	Wii
Destructoid	N/A	8.5/10
Edge	N/A	7/10
Electronic Gaming Monthly	N/A	8/10
Eurogamer	8/10	8/10
Game Informer	N/A	9/10
GamePro	5/5	4/5
GameRevolution	N/A	B
GameSpot	7/10	7.5/10
GameSpy	3.5/5	3/5
GameZone	7.8/10	9/10
IGN	7.8/10	(UK) 8.2/10 (US) 8/10 (AU) 7.9/10
Nintendo Power	N/A	8/10
Pocket Gamer	4/5	N/A
Retro Gamer	N/A	87%

Geometry Wars: Galaxies received "generally favorable reviews" on both platforms according to the review aggregation website Metacritic.

GameSpot's Alex Navarro noted that both versions of the game had the same content in terms of gameplay, levels, and multiplayer while praising those elements at the same time. However, he cited the DS version as having worse graphics and performance than the Wii version, necessitating the lower score. Mark Bozon of IGN praised both versions of the game for the gameplay, the amount of content, and the visual effects, but pointed out how the DS version had no analog controls compared to the Wii version and framerate issues during intense moments as reasons for the slightly lower score. He ultimately concluded that the Wii version's Classic Controller setup is the best way to play Galaxies.
