= GW2 =

GW2 may refer to:

- Gears of War 2, a science-fiction third-person shooter
- Geometry Wars: Retro Evolved², a multidirectional shooter video game created by Bizarre Creations
- Guild Wars 2, a massively multiplayer online role-playing game by ArenaNet
- Iraq War of 2003, or Gulf War 2
- Plants vs. Zombies: Garden Warfare 2, a 2016 video game by PopCap
