= Wiz 'n' Liz =

1993 video game

Wiz 'n' Liz The Frantic Wabbit Wescue
- Developers: Raising Hell Software (MD); Lunatic Software (Amiga)
- Publisher: Psygnosis
- Designers: Martyn R. Chudley; Mike Waterworth
- Composer: Matt Furniss
- Platforms: Mega Drive, Amiga
- Release: Mega Drive: EU: November 26, 1993; NA: January 6, 1994; Amiga: EU: December 3, 1993
- Genre: Platform
- Modes: Single-player, multiplayer

Wiz 'n' Liz: The Frantic Wabbit Wescue is a platform game developed by Raising Hell Software for the Sega Mega Drive and published by Psygnosis in 1993. An Amiga port was developed by Lunatic Software. It is a humorous, cutesy platform game. With the exception of some end-of-level bosses, the game contains no enemies.

== Gameplay ==
Screenshot from the Amiga version

The game takes place on a series of levels, each divided into eight worlds. Each world has a distinct graphical style and music, but the basic gameplay remains the same. Wiz and/or Liz must run through the landscape collecting wabbits against a strict time limit. To win, the player must collect floating letters that appear when a wabbit is collected to spell out a magic word shown at the top of the screen. Once an entire word is collected, the player then must rescue all remaining wabbits on the level, who now release collectable fruit, stars, and clocks to increase the time limit. The limit starts at three minutes and is only restarted when the player character dies. This time limit can however be extended by collecting a glowing orange orb which appears in the last ten seconds of a countdown and gives thirty seconds of bonus time.

At the end of each stage, collected fruit can be mixed in a cauldron and depending on the fruit, the effect can be bonus points, a minigame, a weird graphical effect, a bit of silliness (such as declaring a "Game Over" and killing the player's character, only to put them back with a sheepish "Only joking..."), turning the wabbits different colours, or "Absolutely Nothing".

Wiz 'n' Liz features a number of cameo appearances from other Psygnosis characters, including Puggsy and Lemmings.

The bonus game was featured in the original mid-90s run of the competitive gaming television show Games World (broadcast on Sky One in the UK) as one of the challenges. Players took turns to play the bonus game of collecting the blue wabbits and the highest scorer won that particular challenge.

== Plot ==
Wiz 'n' Liz takes place on the magical planet of Pum, where a group of "wabbits" (rabbits) have been taken by a spell gone awry and it's the job of two wizards – Wiz and Liz – to rescue them.

== Reception ==
A review from the MegaZone magazine described the game as 'cute, original and very, very fast'. Reviews on the Amiga were generally positive. Amiga Action described the game as 'an all out, fast action platform extravaganza, with nice graphics and sound and an endearing storyline'. Amiga Power found the game 'absolutely lovely' but shallow, though the reviewer praised the two-player mode and hidden mini-games.

Reception

Aggregate score
Aggregator	Score
GameRankings	82.5% (Gen)

Review scores
Publication	Score
Mean Machines Sega	85% (Mega Drive)
Sega-16	9/10 (Gen)
Amiga Action	69% (Amiga)
Amiga Format	77% (Amiga)
Amiga Power	78% (Amiga)
The One Amiga	86% (Amiga)
