= Metropolis Street Racer =

2000 video game

- PAL version cover art featuring an Opel Speedster (foreground) and a Fiat Barchetta (background)
- Developer: Bizarre Creations
- Publisher: Sega
- Composer: Richard Jacques
- Platform: Dreamcast
- Release: UK: 3 November 2000; NA: 16 January 2001
- Genre: Racing
- Modes: Single-player, multiplayer

Metropolis Street Racer (MSR) is a racing video game developed by Bizarre Creations and published by Sega exclusively for the Dreamcast. Initially intended as a launch title for the Dreamcast, its release in Europe was delayed until November 2000, with a North American version following in January 2001. A Japanese version was anticipated by February 22, 2001, but was ultimately canceled after Sega discontinued support for the Dreamcast.

Metropolis Street Racer is notable for introducing the "Kudos" system, which rewards players for racing stylishly as well as quickly. The game features detailed and accurate recreations of the cities of London, Tokyo, and San Francisco. The music for the game was composed by Richard Jacques and is delivered through nine fictional radio stations (three for each city), similar to the Grand Theft Auto series. The day/night cycle during gameplay is realistic, as the game uses the internal clock of the Dreamcast to reflect the present time in each in-game city. A key selling point of Metropolis Street Racer is the large number of available tracks (262 in total), created by blocking off specific areas of the city to guide players along designated roads and paths. However, only a small number of tracks are accessible at the start, with most unlocked by progressing through the single-player mode.

Although the game received positive reviews, it did not achieve strong sales due to the discontinuation of the Dreamcast shortly after its release. Bizarre Creations took the concept of the game and developed Project Gotham Racing for Xbox, which became a best-seller and led to the series of the same name.

== Gameplay ==
Gameplay in MSR is centered around the single-player mode, with tracks and cars in the multiplayer mode being unlocked concurrently with those in the single-player game. The premise is that, as a street racer, the player must impress other drivers with quick yet stylish driving across a series of challenges. These challenges are organized into sets of ten (called Chapters, with a total of 25), and completing all challenges in a chapter unlocks the next chapter (provided the player has enough Kudos, see below) and a new car. Each challenge takes place on a different track, and unlocking a challenge also makes that track available in the time-attack and multiplayer modes.

=== Challenges ===
- Hotlap: Race solo around a track—typically three laps—and attempt to beat a specific time. An alternate version records the average time for all laps.
- One-on-One: A race (usually three laps) against an opponent. The player can give themselves or the computer opponent a head start of up to 60 seconds.
- Street Race: A single race against multiple opponents.
- Championship: A series of four races against three opponents. Points are awarded based on the player's position at the end of each race. This challenge is typically the last one in the chapter.
- Challenge: A race with custom rules, such as passing a certain number of cars within a time limit.

Some challenges (typically within the Challenge category) feature a time-based unlock mechanism, allowing secret cars or cheats to be accessed by completing the challenge within a specified timeframe. The challenge can still be completed outside this designated time, but doing so will not yield the associated rewards.

=== Kudos ===
Kudos (from Greek κῦδος, meaning 'praise' or 'glory') serves as the currency in MSR. It is earned during challenges in two categories: Skill and Style. Skill Kudos are awarded for successfully completing a challenge. The difficulty of challenges is user-configurable—for example, by reducing the time limit or increasing the head start for opponents—with more challenging scenarios rewarding greater Kudos upon completion. Style Kudos are earned by drifting, which involves using the handbrake to skid while turning. A "K" symbol appears when drifting, becoming brighter the longer and more pronounced the drift. The more opaque the symbol, the more Kudos are earned. Additionally, Kudos are awarded for finishing a race without colliding with obstacles or other cars. Kudos are lost if the driver collides with a wall, obstacle, or other vehicle (theoretically, Kudos are not lost if another car collides with the player, but this is not always the case), or by failing the challenge, resulting in a final Kudos total of -25 "K" for that challenge. Cancelling a challenge incurs a penalty of -50 "K".

Kudos are calculated on a per-challenge basis. Each challenge's Kudos result is stored, and only the most recent attempt is recorded. For example, if a challenge is completed with 250 "K" and is then attempted unsuccessfully, the result for that challenge will change to -25 "K".

By playing the game, players can earn "Joker" cards. Using one of these cards before starting a challenge will double the amount of Kudos gained or lost during that attempt.

=== Cars ===
In single-player mode, the player has access to a garage that holds up to six cars. To acquire a new car, the player must complete a challenge using that vehicle—typically involving a short lap within a time limit. The player has unlimited time to finish the challenge. Once earned, the new car can be customized.

The color of the car and the opacity of the windows can be modified, along with the number plate. The ABS can also be toggled on or off, and convertible cars may be set to hard-top, soft-top, or open-top configurations to accommodate different weather conditions.

Kudos is also linked to the player's cars. Since there are initially only three spaces in the garage, it may become necessary to dispose of cars to make room for better vehicles unlocked during gameplay. However, disposing of a car incurs a penalty of 10% of the Kudos earned while driving that vehicle. This mechanic is designed to encourage players to switch cars less frequently and to spend more time with their preferred vehicle, especially in lower chapters, to achieve higher Kudos results.

=== Online Functionality ===
While MSR did not support network racing, various features can be accessed via the Internet option in the main menu:

- Time Trial: A time attack mode featuring a specific car, course, and weather condition. Best lap times can be saved as ghost cars within the trials themselves. A separate VMU file is created that can be shared with others for competition.
- Speed Challenge: These are time attacks on designated courses from each city: Market West II (San Francisco), Parliament Street South II (London), and Higashi-Dori Kita II (Tokyo). They can only be raced using the VX220/Opel Speedster cars with automatic transmission and ABS activated. Until March 2002, players could upload their best times to an online ranking system within Dreamarena.

Players registered with Dreamarena/Seganet could also access a dedicated MSR microsite using the built-in browser. This site included the following features:

- Speed Challenge Ranking: Players could submit their best times for each course or an overall best time.
- World Time Trial Ranking: This section displayed the top ten best lap records for each course. Players competed by uploading their Time Trial files, which could then be downloaded by others for challenges.
- World Kudos Ranking: This feature tracked the best total Kudos scores. It was activated on 5 January 2001 due to score bugs present in the initial PAL editions.
- Ghost Attack: This feature allowed players to compete against pre-set ghost cars from various courses.
- Driving tips and links to the MSR message board within Dreamarena.

The site also hosted nine "New Time Trials" billed as "races created by Sega on an exclusive circuit that you can download and challenge". However, these circuits were simply the 'Challenge' tracks (Shibuya Challenge, Westminster Challenge, Pacific Challenge, etc.) that were already present in the game. Reports indicate that the top 10 ranking for this feature was never implemented.

The microsite and rankings were closed in March 2002 with the demise of Dreamarena and SegaNet.

== Development ==
In 1997, Bizarre Creations was approached by Sega Europe to create a street racer for the upcoming Dreamcast console. This occurred after Sega's Kats Sato discovered that they were the developers behind the Formula 1 and Formula 1 97 games on Sony's PlayStation. According to Martyn Chudley, Bizarre Creations' managing director, "Kats was given the task of finding out who was developing Formula 1 for Sony. So, at the ECTS [1997], he pulled out the power cable so he could see the [F1] start-up credits". After a meeting with Sega Europe's then-CEO, Kazutoshi Miyake, Bizarre Creations accepted their offer to work on the project. Martyn Chudley noted that Sega provided Bizarre Creations with an opportunity to branch out after learning they had been lined up for additional F1 titles.

To model the settings of San Francisco, London, and Tokyo, Bizarre Creations sent staff to each city to capture "tens of thousands of photographs" and "hours of video footage in every last location", alongside sourcing detailed maps and aerial photographs. For modeling the individual buildings, one general reference photo of each was taken, along with multiple close-ups to create textures, resulting in up to 20 reference photos per building. 3D artist Mark Sharratt, the lead on the San Francisco map, explained to Official Dreamcast Magazine that he would "start by scanning in the District Council Land Use contour maps and bringing them into Softimage, then drawing around them to get the scale right", before using the reference photos and video "to get everything the right shape". Sharratt stated that he then "scanned in all the photographs, removed the perspective in Photoshop to make them straight", before "removing the people, trees, wires, and other distractions from the pictures so they could be used as textures for the buildings". This process was repeated for each city, covering approximately 1.5 square miles.

The first PAL release had several major bugs. Unsold discs were quickly recalled and replaced with a second PAL version that eliminated most of the significant bugs, though not all. Sega Europe also offered replacement disks—the final PAL version—free of charge to anyone who had purchased a faulty copy. The US release and the final PAL version were both free of major bugs, although some minor ones persisted. Martyn Chudley mentioned that while Bizarre Creations had fixed all bugs reported to them by Sega (who were responsible for Quality Assurance) before the release, some bugs must have slipped through Sega's comprehensive testing plan due to the sheer size of the game.

Metropolis Street Racer was also the first racing game to feature radio stations and DJs speaking between music tracks. The soundtrack was composed by Richard Jacques. Some songs on the radio stations were performed by TJ Davis, who also sang tracks for the Sega Saturn game, Sonic R.

=== Removal of replay feature ===
An advertised replay feature was removed from all retail versions of MSR due to time constraints, even as review copies sent to magazines included this functionality, and the US instruction manual suggested its presence. Pre-recorded demo races can be watched from replay angles, but no additional replay options are available. In Issue #16 of the UK's Official Dreamcast Magazine (ODM), Martyn Chudley provided the following explanation for the removal:

"Unfortunately, there was a problem with the replays which the Sega testers discovered near the end of development. We tried for about two weeks to fix this bug, but time ran out, so the only thing we could do was remove the replays. We're upset that we had to do that, but with no time left, there was no other choice."

== Reception ==
Reception

Aggregate score
Aggregator	Score
Metacritic	87/100

Review scores
Publication	Score
AllGame	4/5
Edge	9/10
Electronic Gaming Monthly	7/10 (Note: Three critics of Electronic Gaming Monthly gave the game scores of 7/10, 6.5/10, and 7.5/10.)
EP Daily	8/10
Eurogamer	9/10
Game Informer	9/10
GameRevolution	B−
GameSpot	7.7/10
GameSpy	7/10
IGN	9.1/10
Next Generation	5/5
X-Play	4/5

The game received "generally favorable reviews", according to the review aggregation website Metacritic. Jim Preston of NextGen stated, "Full of good ideas, great graphics, and expert driving, this one hits on all cylinders". Four-Eyed Dragon of GamePro remarked, "While MSR has some great features, it certainly isn't every racer's dream". (Note: GamePro gave the game 5/5 for graphics, two 4/5 scores for sound and fun factor, and 4.5/5 for control.)

Brandon Justice of IGN commented that it "has a great sense of progression, difficulty, and refinement throughout, and while it may be too difficult for people with little patience, it is one of the most rewarding gameplay experiences in the history of the genre". However, Shane Satterfield of GameSpot described it as "a beautiful racer with accurate physics and tight control, but the kudos system makes it far more challenging than it needs to be".

The game was a runner-up for Graphical Achievement at the Edge Magazine Awards 2001 held on 18 April that year.

In Spain, Metropolis Street Racer topped the Dreamcast sales charts at video game retailer Centro Mail in both the December 2000 and January 2001 issues of Revista Oficial Dreamcast. According to Martyn Chudley, the game sold approximately 120,000 units worldwide, with the majority being sold in the US, totalling 101,757 units; while in Europe, 13,297 units were sold within the first two days, indicating that fewer than 5,000 were sold in that territory post-launch. Chudley described the sales figures as "measly" and attributed them to the Dreamcast's decline, the game's late release, and the discovery of high-profile bugs after launch. He also noted that Bizarre Creations had invested around £1 million of their own money into the game and inquired with Sega about releasing it on Sony's PlayStation 2, but Sega declined. Edge remarked during a preview for Project Gotham Racing that releasing MSR exclusively for Dreamcast was akin to "The Beatles exclusively selling the White Album on Mars".

== See also ==
- Driving Emotion Type-S
- F355 Challenge
- Ridge Racer V
- Sega GT
- Project Gotham Racing
