= Peugeot Flux =

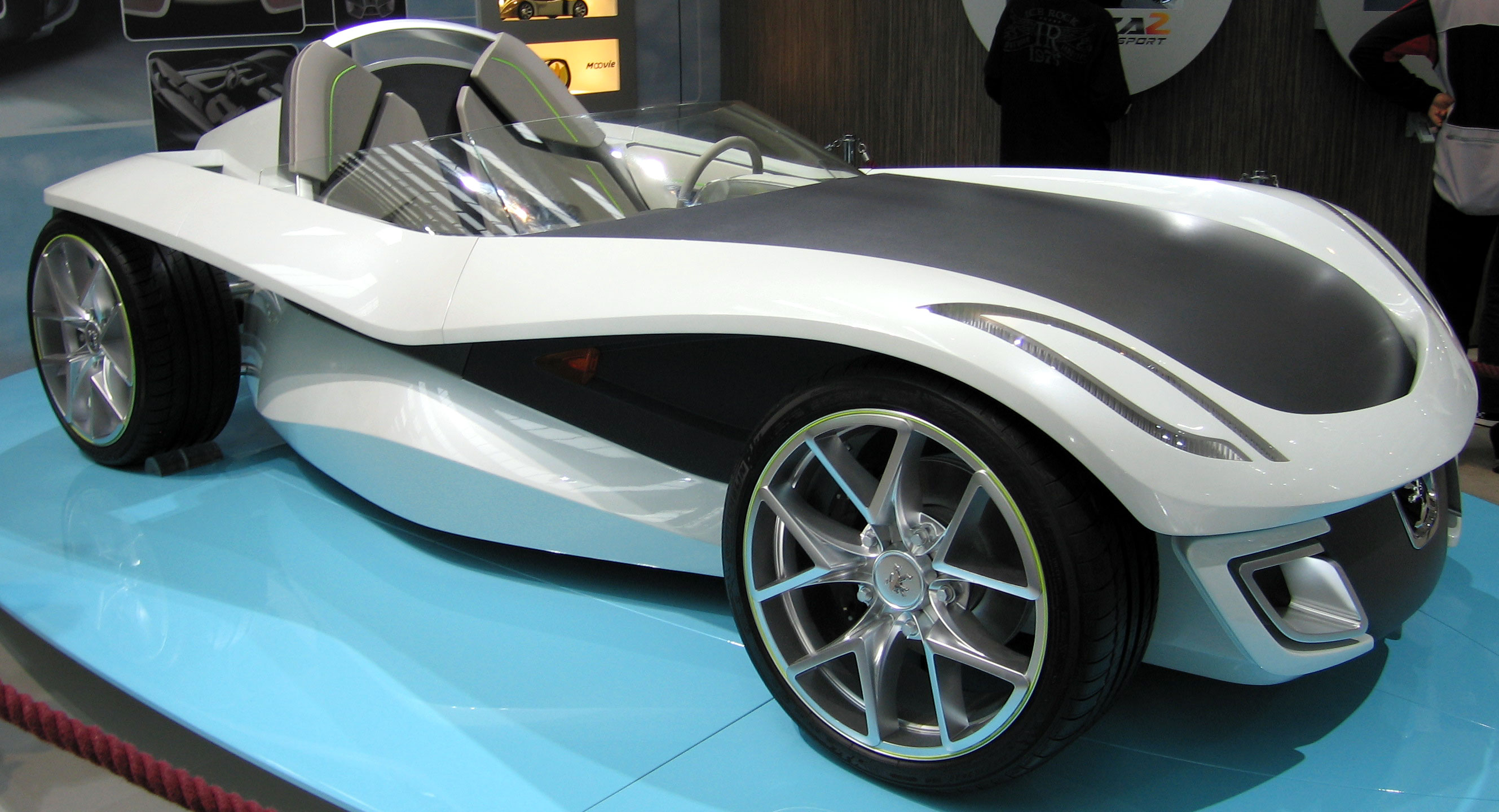

Overview
- Manufacturer: Peugeot
- Designer: Mihai Panaitescu

Body and chassis
- Class: Concept vehicle
- Body style: 2-door roadster
- Layout: Dual motors four-wheel drive

Powertrain
- Engine: Hydrogen Fuel Cell Engine (with 93 kW Electric Motor)
- Transmission: Single-speed

The original 3D design for the Flux

The Peugeot Flux is a concept car from Peugeot that won the 2007 Peugeot International Design Competition after being unveiled at the Frankfurt Motor Show that year.

The car was designed by a 20-year-old Romanian, Mihai Panaitescu. Panaitescu said he wanted to create a car where “the occupants are always in contact with their surroundings” and that the car was intended to be used “as an explorer of sandy beaches, sweeping mountain roads, or simply commuting in the city”.

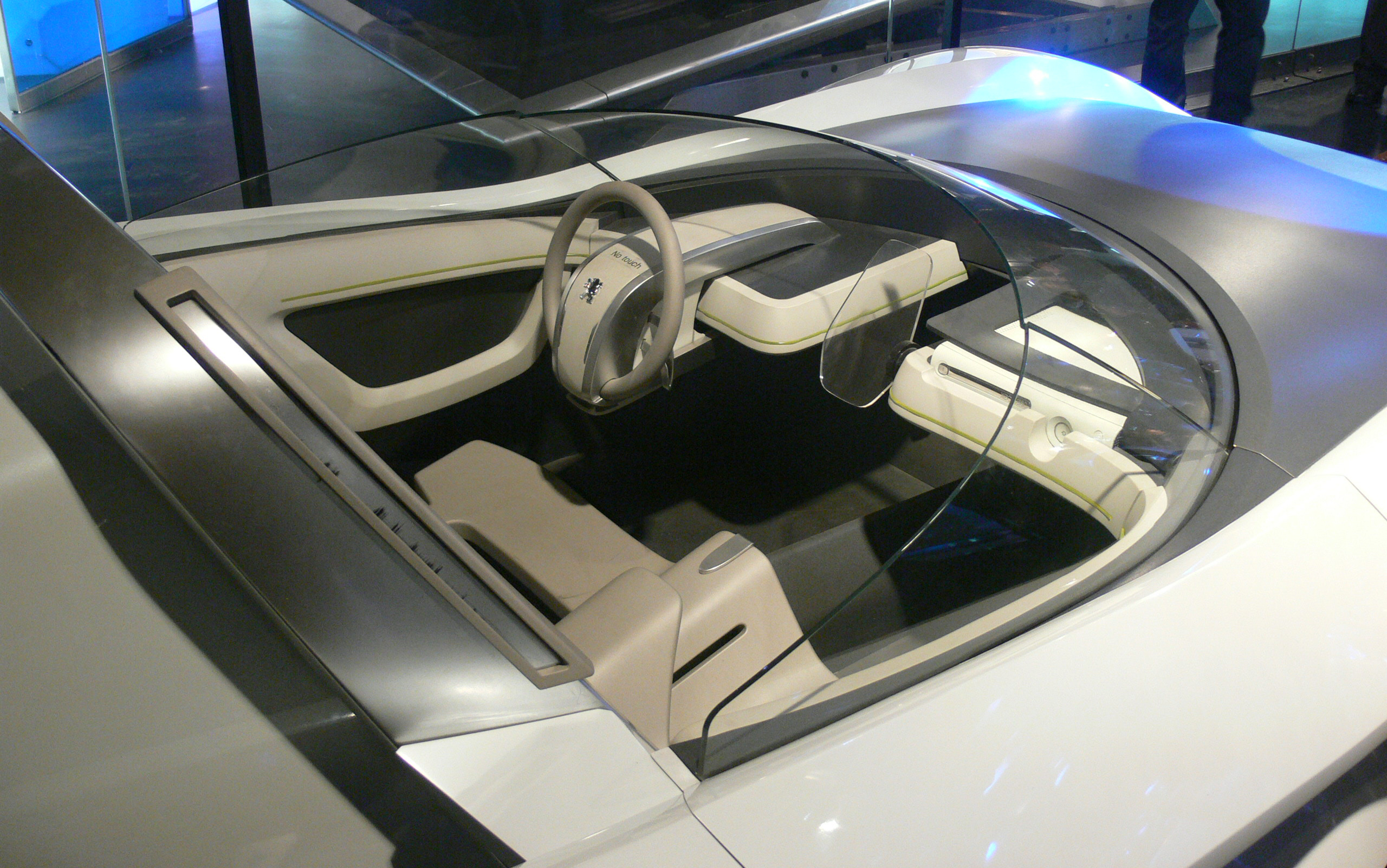
Interior of the Flux

The vehicle was powered by hydrogen, with the powerplant mounted in the back and the tank in the front bonnet. The body of the Flux uses plastic body panels, polyurethane seats and an aluminium chassis. The Flux also featured as downloadable content for Project Gotham Racing 4 (2007), in which an Xbox 360 console can be seen on the right-hand side of the dashboard.

Peugeot auctioned the car in September 2020.
