= Time Viking!!!!!AndSpaceRaptor =

2011 video game

- Developer: Ska Studios
- Publisher: Ska Studios (Xbox Live)
- Designer: James Silva
- Programmer: James Silva
- Artist: James Silva
- Composer: James Silva
- Platforms: Windows Phone 7, Xbox 360
- Release: Windows Phone 7 November 29, 2011; Xbox 360; January 1, 2014
- Genre: Shoot 'em up
- Modes: Single-player, multiplayer

Time Viking!!!!!AndSpaceRaptor (stylized in all caps, also referred to as Time Viking) is a 2011 shoot-em-up game developed by Ska Studios and produced by company founder James Silva. It is a spiritual successor to the developer's earlier game I Maed a Gam3 w1th Z0mb1es 1n It!!!1. Gameplay follows the player, a time-traveling Viking, fight off legions of enemies until the background music ends. With a final boss at the end being the moon.

Time Viking!!!!!AndSpaceRaptor was featured as a bonus game alongside the 2011 Windows Phone port of I Maed a Gam3 w1th Z0mb1es 1n It!!!1 titled Z0MB1ES (on teh ph0ne) [sic]. A full version of it was released on January 1, 2014 for the Xbox 360 via Xbox Live Indie Games. Before its release, GameSpot praised the trailer. The full release received praised from critics for its music and graphics.

== Gameplay ==
Gameplay screenshot

Time Viking!!!!!AndSpaceRaptor is a shoot-em-up twin-stick game for one or two players, who view the gameplay from a side-scrolling perspective. The player is a time-traveling Viking that has a Space Raptor. The goal is to fight off legions of giant cats, robots, and alien invaders. The player must survive for the duration of the background song. The background song describes in simple detail that "you are controlling a time-traveling viking again and again. It's charming, fast, loud and only a buck." The final boss is the moon.

== Release ==
An earlier version of Time Viking!!!!!AndSpaceRaptor, simply named Time Viking, is featured as a bonus game alongside Z0MB1ES (on teh ph0ne) [sic] released on Windows Phone in 2011. Ska Studios released the trailer for a full version of Time Viking!!!!!AndSpaceRaptor in 2013. It was released on January 1, 2014 for the Xbox 360 via Xbox Live Indie Games.

== Reception ==
Time Viking!!!!!AndSpaceRaptor received news coverage from gaming outlets, including Engadget, Destructoid, and GameSpot. Critics praised the music for its mix of dubstep, heavy metal and emo pop. GameSpot praised the trailer, saying that it's "worth watching for the song alone". Windows Central said that it "look[s] a lot nicer" than I Maed a Gam3 w1th Z0mb1es 1n It!!!1, ending with "On the whole, 'Time Viking' rounds out the package nicely."
