= Project Gotham Racing 4 =

2007 video game

- PAL cover art featuring a Ferrari 599
- Developer: Bizarre Creations
- Publisher: Microsoft Game Studios
- Director: Martyn R. Chudley
- Producers: Peter O'Brien; Chris Morland; Chris Pickford
- Designer: Ged Talbot
- Programmers: Paul Kerby; David Worswick; Roger Perkins; Ken MacLeod
- Artist: Timothy Dean
- Series: Project Gotham Racing
- Platform: Xbox 360
- Release: 2007
- Genre: Racing
- Modes: Single-player, multiplayer

Project Gotham Racing 4 is a 2007 racing video game developed by Bizarre Creations and published by Microsoft Game Studios. The fourth main title of the Project Gotham Racing series, it was released exclusively for the Xbox 360. New features included weather effects, Bulldog mode, and the inclusion of motorcycles. Like its predecessors, PGR4 was a critical and commercial success, however it would be the final title in the series, with Bizarre having since been acquired by Activision, and announcing that Project Gotham Racing 4 would be their last game produced for distribution by Microsoft Game Studios.

== Gameplay ==
Project Gotham Racing 4 includes many of the tracks of the series' previous installment, including Tokyo, New York, the Nürburgring, London and Las Vegas; plus five more cities and tracks: Shanghai, St. Petersburg, Quebec City, Macau and the Michelin Test Track.

The most prominent addition to Project Gotham Racing 4 is advanced weather effects that affect the look of the game and the physics of the cars on the track. The weather can change from sun to rain to snow to hail within a single race. A system logged on to Xbox Live will download weather data from The Weather Channel, allowing users to set in-game conditions to mirror current weather in their respective cities.

The game simulates ten types of weather, including clear days, clouds, light to stormy rain, fog, snow and even ice. In user-created races, weather is fully customisable along with all the other race variations. In the game's expanded and improved career mode, weather is predetermined, which adds an extra obstacle for players to overcome.

=== Online components ===
Project Gotham Racing 4 introduced a new online game mode, called "Bulldog". One player starts out as the Bulldog, whose job is to tag every other opponent in the game, thus creating new bulldogs as they go. This mode is played in an open section of a city, allowing the players to turn on to any street they want. Both cars and bikes are allowed to play in this mode simultaneously.

PGR Nations was launched with the release of the game. Players connected to Xbox Live would race on behalf of a certain country and their average statistics would be added to the total of their country's through a leaderboard.

=== Vehicles ===
A screenshot of a race featuring motorcycles

Project Gotham Racing 4 features more than 130 vehicles, including the newly introduced motorcycles.

The game marks a return to the car balance of Project Gotham Racing 2, with cars ranging from low-performance hatchbacks to high-performance supercars. Project Gotham Racing 3 emphasized supercars and special models, but did have a few high-performance production cars.

=== Geometry Wars: Waves ===
The game debuted with a bonus mini-game Geometry Wars: Waves, which would later be included in Geometry Wars: Retro Evolved 2.

Along with an ad campaign Microsoft also released various promotional items, the biggest being Project Gotham Racing Mobile which contained a code that unlocked a sneak peek trailer via the Project Gotham Racing 3 website.

Project Gotham Racing 4 was included as part of the Xbox 360 Live 12 Month Messenger Gold Pack, which included the game, a 12-month Xbox Live Gold subscription card, a wired headset, and a chat pad controller attachment.

== Soundtrack ==
The soundtrack features 57 songs from a number of different genres. In-game options allows players to switch off particular genres or songs to create a custom playlist of the available songs. A song, called "The Shadow", was exclusively written and performed by The Prodigy and was remixed by Chris Chudley from Audioantics. It plays on the game menus and credits. It dynamically changes when the player moves along different menus in-game.

As with the prior entry in the series, PGR 4 features engine and exhaust sounds recorded on a dyno from actual cars. Tire noise is reproduced in three distinct bands providing feedback for when the car begins to lose traction, down to which tire is skidding.

== Development and release ==
Project Gotham Racing 4 was accidentally leaked by a Peugeot press release for a competition for a car designed by a contestant to be featured in the game before the announcement by Bizarre Creations. The competition was won by Mihai Panaitescu with the Peugeot Flux.

Shortly after, the game was confirmed at X06, with a trailer titled Eclipse shown. The trailer was made available to download on the Xbox Live Marketplace. The car featured in the trailer is a Ferrari 599 GTB Fiorano. The song in the trailer is "Shadow" by The Prodigy remixed by Chris Chudley from Audioantics.

Microsoft announced at the 2007 E3 that Project Gotham Racing 4 would be released in September 2007. Bizarre subsequently said that game wouldn't be released "until it's done" citing reasons that they had spent a substantial amount of money and time on the game: "We feel like we've got more time [on Project Gotham Racing 4]. Last time round, we feel like we got the game ripped away from us", said Brian Woodhouse of Bizarre Creations.

Microsoft re-released the game under its "Classics" banner on 20 March 2009.

== Downloadable content ==
Two new downloadable content packs were released on February 14, 2008. The two packs add a total of ten new achievements to the game. In late 2012, Microsoft removed all PGR4 downloadable content from the Xbox Live Marketplace, and there are no plans to reinstate it.

=== Free Challenge Pack ===
The Free Challenge Pack introduces the hydrogen-powered 2007 Peugeot Flux, winner of the 2007 Peugeot International Design Competition and two new game modes – Tourist Mode, which allows the player to roam around any city in the game, and Free Roam Cat and Mouse where a slow mouse vehicle must avoid enemy cats. Tourist mode is only available in 'Multiplayer' and online with at least one other 'friend'.

=== Premium Challenge Pack ===
The Premium PGR 4 Challenge Pack adds seven new cars and three new bikes. It also adds the World Challenge Arcade Mode which is 20 new arcade events. From 9–16 March 2009, the pack was included as part of Xbox LIVE's Deal of the Week promotion where the pack was temporarily available to Gold members at a discounted price.

== Reception ==
=== Critical ===
Reception

Aggregate score
| Aggregator | Score |
|---|---|
| Metacritic | 85/100 |

Review scores
| Publication | Score |
|---|---|
| Edge | 9/10 |
| Electronic Gaming Monthly | 8.33/10 |
| Eurogamer | 9/10 |
| Game Informer | 8.75/10 |
| GamePro | 3.75/5 |
| GameRevolution | C |
| GameSpot | 8.5/10 |
| GameSpy | 4/5 |
| GameTrailers | 8.7/10 |
| GameZone | 8.5/10 |
| IGN | 8.1/10; 9.1/10 (UK) |
| Official Xbox Magazine (US) | 8/10 |

Project Gotham Racing 4 received "generally favourable" reviews according to video game review aggregator website Metacritic.

Official Xbox Magazine UK gave the game a perfect ten, 1UP.com gave it an A−, and Edge and VideoGamer.com both gave it 9 out of 10. TeamXbox gave the game an 8.4, citing that it was more of "the same" and that Bizarre should move on to bigger and better things. Game Informer gave it an 8.75, stating that the game "has blown its own doors off and finally grown from being a bite-sized, almost niche racer into a full-fledged experience that all racing fanatics should enjoy."

=== Sales ===
Project Gotham Racing 4 received a "Platinum" sales award from the Entertainment and Leisure Software Publishers Association (ELSPA), indicating sales of at least 300,000 copies in the United Kingdom.

=== Accolades ===
During the 11th Annual Interactive Achievement Awards, the Academy of Interactive Arts & Sciences nominated Project Gotham Racing 4 for "Racing Game of the Year".

== See also ==
- Blur (video game)
