= Destruction AllStars =

Defunct 2021 video game

- Developer: Lucid Games
- Publisher: Sony Interactive Entertainment
- Director: Colin Berry
- Designer: Karl Jones
- Composers: 2WEI; Tumult Kollektiv
- Engine: Unreal Engine 4
- Platform: PlayStation 5
- Release: February 2, 2021
- Genre: Vehicular combat
- Modes: Single-player, multiplayer

Destruction AllStars is a vehicular combat video game developed by Lucid Games and published by Sony Interactive Entertainment for the PlayStation 5. It was released on February 2, 2021 to mixed reviews.

On May 26, 2026, the game was delisted from the PlayStation Store along with the ability to purchase the game's virtual currency. The game's online servers were also shut down. However, owners of the game are still able to access the game's single-player modes and redeem their remaining virtual currency within the single-player modes until November 25, 2026, which is when all server support for the game will be shut down.

== Gameplay ==
Destruction AllStars is a "global sports entertainment event where stars & cars collide". The player assumes control of one of 16 characters, referred to as AllStars, each of whom has access to unique hero vehicles. For instance, Hana's car is equipped with a retractable blade that can slice opponent vehicles in half, while Genesis' car is equipped with rocket boosters that give a massive speed boost and help deal more damage to opponent vehicles. The game is a vehicular combat game in which players need to seek ways to destroy the vehicles of the opponents.

AllStars have extremely fluid movements and are very agile, with the ability to seamlessly transition from one vehicle to another by ejecting from their vehicles, whether it be at the push of a button or upon destruction. This causes AllStars to be on foot in the arena, during which they are vulnerable to opponents' vehicles, though they can dodge them by jumping or rolling. To make up for it, each AllStar has unique skills that can turn the battle to their favor, in addition to the ability to jump onto an opponent's vehicle and either take over or instantly destroy it. For instance, Shyft has the ability to go invisible and render himself invisible to opponents' radar, while Lupita has the ability to leave a trail of fire on her path. While on foot, AllStars can also freely navigate the arena to collect shards on their way, set up retractable traps to defend themselves, or simply find another vehicle.

== Development and release ==
Lucid Games is the game's developer. Many of the game's project leads, including lead designer Karl Jones and Game Director Colin Berry, were involved in the creation of several titles from the Wipeout series.

The game was announced on June 11, 2020, at the PlayStation 5 reveal event. The game, along with other games releasing on the PlayStation 5, was the subject of controversy in September 2020, as Sony said that the game would retail at $69.99 at launch, a departure from the $59.99 industry standard price for AAA games during the eighth generation of consoles. The game will be supported with new content and modes following release with free downloadable content. The game was set to be released in November 2020 as a launch title for the PS5. In October 2020, Sony announced that the game would be delayed to February 2021, and that it would be released for free for PlayStation Plus subscribers during the game's first two months of release. The game received a paid digital release on April 6, 2021, for $19.99 and a physical release a day later on April 7, 2021.

== Reception ==
Reception

Aggregate score
Aggregator	Score
Metacritic	62/100

Review scores
Publication	Score
Destructoid	6.5/10
Game Informer	8/10
GameSpot	5/10
IGN	6/10

The game received mixed or average reviews upon release, according to review aggregator website Metacritic. Critics generally liked the core gameplay loop, the driving mechanic and the vehicular combat. However, it was criticized for its lack of content and invasive microtransactions.
