= Geometry Wars 3: Dimensions =

2014 video game

- Developer: Lucid Games
- Publishers: Activision (Note: Released under the Sierra Entertainment brand name.); Aspyr (Mac, Linux)
- Series: Geometry Wars
- Platforms: Microsoft Windows, OS X, Linux, PlayStation 3, Xbox 360, PlayStation 4, Xbox One, iOS, Android, PlayStation Vita
- Release: Microsoft Windows, OS X, Linux, PlayStation 3, PlayStation 4 November 25, 2014; Xbox 360, Xbox One; November 26, 2014 iOS; May 28, 2015; Android; June 24, 2015; PlayStation Vita; July 7, 2015
- Genre: Shoot 'em up
- Modes: Single-player, multiplayer

Geometry Wars 3: Dimensions is a 2014 multidirectional shoot 'em up video game developed by Lucid Games and published by Activision under the Sierra Entertainment brand name. The game was released in November 2014 for Microsoft Windows, OS X, Linux, PlayStation 3, PlayStation 4, Xbox 360 and Xbox One and in 2015 for iOS and Android. As the sequel to Geometry Wars: Retro Evolved 2, Geometry Wars 3: Dimensions is the first game in the series to be released on PlayStation platforms. It is the sixth installment in the Geometry Wars series and the first one developed after the creator of the series Bizarre Creations was shut down by Activision.

== Gameplay ==
Gameplay screenshot of a boss level in Geometry Wars 3: Dimensions. The player (center) must avoid contact with enemies, while slowly firing on the boss and depleting its health.

The player pilots a claw-shaped ship that can shoot independently of where it is pointing. The primary objective is to destroy a variety of enemy shapes which attempt to destroy the ship. Depending on the game mode, extra lives and extra supers can be collected upon achieving a certain number of points. Supers can be chosen before the game starts, and are expendable powerups that have extreme effects on the game, such as turrets that shoot enemies and a massive wave of bullets. In addition, several 'drones' may be selected to accompany the player to perform tasks, such as collecting geoms or firing on enemies.

Crucial to effective play is the score multiplier, which can be increased by collecting small green diamonds called "geoms". Skilled players may get the multiplier into the ten-thousands on occasions.

== Development ==
The game was developed by Sierra Entertainment and Lucid Games for the Xbox One, Xbox 360, PlayStation 3, and PlayStation 4. It is the first game published by Sierra since May 6, 2009 when they released Zombie Wranglers.

== Release ==
The game was released worldwide on November 25, 2014 for PC, PlayStation 3 and PlayStation 4 and November 26 for the Xbox 360 and Xbox One. A free update, titled Geometry Wars 3: Dimensions Evolved was released on March 31, 2015 on all platforms. The update included 40 new levels and other gameplay features such as new boss battles and gameplay types. Existing players received Evolved as a free update, and it is also included in new purchases of the game.

Geometry Wars 3: Dimensions Evolved received a physical disc release on PS4 and Xbox One on October 11, 2016.

== Reception ==
Reception

Aggregate scores
Aggregator	Score
GameRankings	(iOS) 95.71% (PS4) 87.36% (PC) 78.00% (XONE) 85.26%
Metacritic	(iOS) 95/100 (PS4) 85/100 (PC) 79/100 (XONE) 83/100

Review scores
Publication	Score
Destructoid	10/10
Eurogamer	7/10
Polygon	8/10

Geometry Wars 3: Dimensions received positive reviews. Aggregating review websites GameRankings and Metacritic gave the PlayStation 4 version 87.36% based on 11 reviews and 85/100 based on 20 reviews, the Microsoft Windows version 78.00% based on 4 reviews and 79/100 based on 4 reviews and the Xbox 360 version 85.26% based on 19 reviews and 83/100 based on 21 reviews.

Brett Makedonski from Destructoid gave the game a perfect score, praising the responsive shooting mechanics, distinct level-design of the adventure campaign, inclusion of various new modes, as well as a "classic mode", which has similar gameplay as its predecessor Retro Evolved 2. He stated that "Geometry Wars 3: Dimensions improves as much as possible while still staying true to the core of the franchise. That old game is still there, it's just unspeakably better now. It may have been past installments in the series that were billed as evolution, but Dimensions is where Geometry Wars truly evolved".

Christian Donlan from Eurogamer was more reserved in his praise, feeling the game wasn't up to par with its predecessors: "I'm not sure if Lucid really gets the mentality behind this series, and that makes for a perfectly serviceable shooter when the lineage requires something more".
