= Fur Fighters =

2000 video game

- Developer: Bizarre Creations
- Publisher: Acclaim Entertainment
- Platforms: Dreamcast; Microsoft Windows; PlayStation 2 iOS
- Release: Dreamcast: EU: 23 June 2000; NA: 13 July 2000; Windows: EU: 10 November 2000; NA: 24 November 2000; PlayStation 2: NA: 7 June 2001; EU: 8 June 2001; iOS; 19 July 2012
- Genres: Third-person shooter, platformer
- Modes: Single-player, multiplayer

Fur Fighters (titled Furrballs in early development) is a video game developed by Bizarre Creations and published by Acclaim Entertainment for the Dreamcast in 2000, later for Microsoft Windows. The game was first announced as a Dreamcast exclusive in the January 1999 issue of Electronic Gaming Monthly, having started development in the summer of 1998. It was designed very much as a standard third-person shooter, but used a world populated by cute little animals as its setting. As a result, the game's depiction of violence is very cartoon-like without losing any of its intensity. In 2001, an updated version for the PlayStation 2 was released as Fur Fighters: Viggo's Revenge. On 20 July 2012, members of Muffin Games, ex-Bizarre Creations staff, announced a conversion for iPad, called Fur Fighters: Viggo on Glass.

== Plot ==
The plot of the game revolves around the Fur Fighters, a group dedicated to fighting against an evil cat named General Viggo, the game's main antagonist. At the beginning of the game, Viggo kidnaps the families of the Fur Fighters, stranding their children around the game's various locations and turning the spouses (or in Tweek's case, mother) into robotic beasts. The story is rather loose, revolving around the Fur Fighters' quest to rescue their babies, save their family, and stop General Viggo.

== Gameplay ==
In Fur Fighters, the player's job is to rescue the tiny animal babies who have been taken from their families by the central villain, General Viggo. Viggo has scattered these babies all over the world, requiring the Fur Fighter families to explore, confront Viggo's henchmen, and rescue all of them. The gameplay featured many unique aspects for a third-person shooter of the time it was released, most notably making each level an extremely large, expansive area that requires sometimes hours of involved exploration to locate the babies and get rid of the enemies. (Examples include a giant construction site and an entire section of a large city, complete with buildings to explore, including a complete museum of modern art.) Maneuvering through these levels often requires careful observation of the environment so as not to get lost, as well as solving puzzles to figure out where some babies might be hidden or how to gain access to more of the level. Unlike most action games of this type, Fur Fighters distinguishes itself by featuring a system where the player can, at many intervals on a level, switch between one of many animal parents. Each parent has their own advantages and disadvantages, with all of them holding their own special abilities allowing them to accomplish specific tasks. These abilities allow the player to maneuver through a variety of obstacles and courses within the players path, such as Roofus allowing the player to burrow in specific spots, Bungalow being able to jump much higher than other characters and Juliette being able to climb up walls. The game contains a variety of unlockable weapons with some of them sharing slots if they use the same ammo type, such as the Heavy Machine Gun, Plasma Blaster and Neutron Gun. The player also has a close range melee attack that has a unique animation for every playable character. The game received additional weapons and melee upgrades in its updated Playstation 2 release Viggo's Revenge.

== Reception ==
Reception

Aggregate score
Aggregator	Score			
Aggregator	Dreamcast	iOS	PC	PS2
Metacritic	80/100	69/100	74/100	64/100

Review scores
Publication	Score			
Publication	Dreamcast	iOS	PC	PS2
AllGame	3/5	N/A	N/A	N/A
CNET Gamecenter	7/10	N/A	N/A	N/A
Edge	8/10	N/A	N/A	8/10
Electronic Gaming Monthly	7.5/10	N/A	N/A	6/10
EP Daily	7/10	N/A	N/A	7.5/10
Eurogamer	7/10	N/A	N/A	N/A
Game Informer	7.75/10	N/A	N/A	6.5/10
GameFan	73/100; 82/100; 71/100	N/A	N/A	N/A
GameRevolution	N/A	N/A	N/A	C
GameSpot	7/10	N/A	6.1/10	7.3/10
GameSpy	8.5/10	N/A	N/A	88%
IGN	8.3/10	N/A	8.3/10	4.5/10
Next Generation	3/5	N/A	N/A	2/5
Official U.S. PlayStation Magazine	N/A	N/A	N/A	3/5
Digital Spy	N/A	3/5	N/A	N/A

The Dreamcast version of Fur Fighters received "favourable" reviews, while its PC version, along with Viggo's Revenge and Viggo on Glass, received "mixed or average reviews", according to video game review aggregator Metacritic. Garrett Kenyon of NextGen's August 2000 issue called the Dreamcast version "A game that's fun for kids and adults alike. It looks great and plays even better." Twelve issues later, however, Daniel Erickson said in his review of Viggo's Revenge, "If you want a shooter or an adventure game, there are better places to turn."

Jake The Snake of GamePro said of the Dreamcast version in one review, "If you'd enjoy a smart, cartoon-based action/adventure game and [you] won't be turned off by the guns, don't miss Fur Fighters." (Note: GamePro gave the Dreamcast version 4/5 for graphics, two 4.5/5 scores for sound and fun factor, and 5/5 for control in one review.) In another GamePro review, Iron Thumbs said, "Fur Fighters isn't all shoot 'em up adventure: the game is packed with everything from small, simple puzzles to extended challenges requiring serious planning and strategy to execute them successfully." (Note: GamePro gave the Dreamcast version three 4.5/5 scores for graphics, control, and fun factor, and 4/5 for sound in another review.) GameZone gave Viggo's Revenge eight out of ten, saying that it "Provides enough of a rush to deal with the fact that the game tends to get a little monotonous."
