= Geometry Wars =

- Genre: Multi-directional shooter
- Developers: Bizarre Creations (2003–2010); Kuju Entertainment (2007); Lucid Games (2014)
- Publishers: Microsoft Game Studios (2003–2008); Vivendi Games (2007); Activision (2008–present)
- Creator: Stephen Cakebread
- Composer: Chris Chudley
- Platforms: Xbox; Xbox 360; Windows; Wii; Nintendo DS; iOS; Linux; OS X; PlayStation 3; PlayStation 4; Xbox One; Android; PlayStation Vita
- First release: Geometry Wars; 18 November 2003
- Latest release: Geometry Wars 3: Dimensions Evolved; 11 October 2016

Geometry Wars is a series of top-down multi-directional shooter video games developed by Bizarre Creations, and, later, Lucid Games. Originally published by Microsoft Games Studios, the first title was included as a minigame in Project Gotham Racing 2 for Xbox. An updated version was released in 2005 as a launch title for Xbox 360 and later ported to Windows. Geometry Wars: Retro Evolved 2, the second installment in the series, was released for the Xbox 360 in 2008.

Other titles in the series were launched in following years to other platforms by Bizarre Creations and publishers Vivendi Games and Activision. The latest entry in the series, Geometry Wars 3: Dimensions, was developed by Lucid Games and launched in 2014.

On 13 October 2023, Microsoft reacquired the game series as part of its acquisition of Activision Blizzard.

== Games ==
Release timeline
2003	Geometry Wars
2004
2005	Geometry Wars: Retro Evolved
2006
2007	Geometry Wars: Waves Geometry Wars: Galaxies
2008	Geometry Wars: Retro Evolved 2
2009
2010	Geometry Wars Touch
2011
2012
2013
2014	Geometry Wars 3: Dimensions
2015
2016	Geometry Wars 3: Dimensions Evolved

=== Geometry Wars ===
Geometry Wars was released in the form of an easter egg minigame in the 2003 racing game Project Gotham Racing 2 on the original Xbox. The game was accessed from within Project Gotham Racing 2 by interacting with an arcade cabinet present in the player's virtual garage.

=== Geometry Wars: Retro Evolved ===
Geometry Wars: Retro Evolved was developed by Bizarre Creations and released for Xbox Live Arcade on Xbox 360. At one point, it held the record for the most downloaded Xbox Live Arcade Game.

=== Geometry Wars: Waves ===
Geometry Wars: Waves was developed by Stephen Cakebread of Bizarre Creations, released as a bonus mini-game as part of Project Gotham Racing 4 on Xbox 360 on October 2, 2007. The game is a variant of Geometry Wars: Retro Evolved where the player is given one life to survive continual waves of orange rockets that pace back and forth across the edges of the play-field for as long as possible.

=== Geometry Wars: Galaxies ===
Geometry Wars: Galaxies was developed by Bizarre Creations and Kuju Entertainment, and published by Vivendi Games for the Wii and Nintendo DS in November 2007, becoming the first Geometry Wars game available on non-Microsoft platforms and the only one available on Nintendo platforms. This updated version includes a single-player campaign mode, several multiplayer modes, Geometry Wars: Retro Evolved, and support for online leaderboards. The Wii version supports widescreen and 480p progressive scan display.

=== Geometry Wars: Retro Evolved 2 ===
Geometry Wars: Retro Evolved 2 was developed by Bizarre Creations, and released on Xbox Live Arcade on Xbox 360 on July 30, 2008 as a sequel to Geometry Wars: Retro Evolved.

==== Geometry Wars: Touch ====
An iOS port of Geometry Wars: Retro Evolved 2 was released in 2010 entitled Geometry Wars: Touch. It added a seventh game mode, Titans, which had gameplay similar to Asteroids, but removed the multiplayer functionality entirely.

=== Geometry Wars 3: Dimensions ===
Geometry Wars 3: Dimensions was developed by Lucid Games and published by Activision under the Sierra Entertainment brand name. The game was released on November 25, 2014 for Microsoft Windows, OS X, Linux, PlayStation 3 and PlayStation 4, on November 26, 2014 for Xbox 360 and Xbox One and in the middle of 2015 for iOS, Android and PlayStation Vita. Geometry Wars 3: Dimensions is the first Sierra video game not to be owned by their former owner Vivendi. It is the first installment of Geometry Wars to be released on Sony platforms and developed after the creator of the series Bizarre Creations was shut down by Activision.

== Soundtrack ==
The soundtrack for the series was composed by Chris Chudley from Audioantics.
