= Jacob Jones and the Bigfoot Mystery =

2013 video game

- Developer: Lucid Games
- Publishers: Sony Computer Entertainment (Vita); Lucid Games (iOS, Android, PC)
- Engine: Unreal Engine 3
- Platforms: PlayStation Vita, iOS, Android, Microsoft Windows
- Release: Episode 1 May 14, 2013: PlayStation Vita; NA: May 14, 2013; PAL: May 15, 2013; iOS; May 16, 2013; Android; July 23, 2014; Windows; September 15, 2014; Episode 2 July 24, 2014: iOS; July 24, 2014; Windows; September 23, 2014
- Genres: Puzzle, adventure
- Mode: Single-player

Jacob Jones and the Bigfoot Mystery is an episodic adventure video game developed by Lucid Games. Part 1 was originally published by Sony Computer Entertainment on PlayStation Vita on May 14, 2013, and later on iOS on May 16, 2013. Episode 2 was released on iOS on July 24, 2014. Both episodes have since been removed from all app stores and made available for Windows via Steam.

== Critical reception ==
=== Episode 1 (PlayStation Vita) ===
The PlayStation Vita version of episode 1 has a Metacritic score of 74 based on 11 critic reviews.

Adventure Gamers said "While the first episode is a little uneven in its story and puzzle pacing at times, Jacob Jones and the Bigfoot Mystery is a delightfully stylish debut that makes me want to come back for more. " Eurogamer Sweden said "The first episode of Jacob Jones’ adventure leaves me wanting more and I'm already waiting for the next part. It's a great little title that will appeal to any gamer that loves a good puzzle. " XGN wrote "This game is such a nice puzzle game. It's a cheap episode and it's really fun. Maybe it even gives us a little bit of a PS Vita comeback! " Push Square said "Jacob Jones and the Bigfoot Mystery: Episode One - A Bump in the Night sets the scene on an enjoyable world, and introduces some entertaining puzzles in the process. The stiff challenge is well balanced with lots of hints, though the difficulty does feel a little at odds with the child-friendly aesthetic. Nevertheless, the presentation is exquisite throughout, and we're already looking forward to the next instalment in this charming series." VandalOnline said "This is a great idea, with some brilliant puzzles and some not-so-brilliant ones. Still, taking into account its affordable price, we think it deserves a try. " PSX-Sense.nl said "Jacob Jones and the Bigfoot Mystery is an episodic title and the first episode has recently been released. There's a lot of text to tell the story and there's a couple of difficult puzzles to get through. Long story short: this is a fun PlayStation Vita game, available at a low price. " The Digital Fix said "Overall probably the greatest success of A Bump in the Night is taking Jacob and ensuring that his character is likable, rather than simply presenting him as one of those annoying know-it-all kids that you enjoyed not being friends with when you were younger. The storytelling may be linear but as we've seen with Telltale's The Walking Dead that's no obstacle for a good yarn. " The Sixth Axis said "Penned by TV's own George Poles, this charming sequence of interspersed brainteasers, point-to-go navigation and child-like exposition never really threatens to wow, but still manages to keep you hooked until the end, if only to find out where that admittedly brief storyline is heading. " Pocket Gamer UK said "The first Jacob Jones and the Bigfoot Mystery episode definitely has the style. Now, it just needs more substance in its puzzles to back that style up. " Eurogamer Portugal said "This is a satisfactory title that contains some nice graphics and caricatured characters, though the story is undemanding. "

=== Episode 1 (iOS, Android, Windows) ===
The iOS version of episode 1 has a Metacritic score of 84 based on 8 critic reviews.

SlideToPlay said "The 3D visuals, full voice-overs, and engaging puzzles make Jacob Jones and the Bigfoot Mystery a top-tier iOS puzzle adventure. " TouchArcade wrote "Jacob Jones and the Bigfoot Mystery: Episode 1 – A Bump in the Night is, at its core, a simple game with a mix of challenging and dastardly puzzles thrown in that will be enjoyable for both adults and kids." ArcadeSushi said "It's not a point-and-click and it's not a straight up puzzle title, but rather a mixture of the two. Take one part Professor Layton and one part Sasquatch, throw in a generous helping of Psychonauts, and you have this charming title. " GameMastersUK deemed it "Funny and intelligent". Apple'N'Apps said "Jacob Jones and the Bigfoot Mystery : Episode 1 is a thoroughly entertaining all around experience that is a should buy, and will leave you anxiously anticipating Episode 2. " 148Apps said "Charming and cute, Jacob Jones and the Bigfoot Mystery also offers some fun puzzles and mysteries to solve. " Multiplayer.it said "This first episode is a neat beginning for Jacob Jones, with a great art style and some cute characters. Hopefully we'll see better and fresher puzzles in the next chapters. " Gamezebo wrote "Certainly not a bad game: it's just a little too much on the simple side. It has a shining presentation and beautiful visuals, but the lack of things to do can quickly sour the total experience. "

=== Episode 2 (iOS, Android, Windows) ===
The game has a Metacritic score of 64% based on 4 Critics. Apple'N'Apps said "Jacob Jones and the Bigfoot Mystery Episode 2 is a well done puzzle adventure that is worth picking up, though it doesn't live up to the expectations based on episode one." Pocket Gamer uk said "Jacob Jones 2 offers a rich world, and a handful of fun puzzles. But a brazen lack of content and no advancement in story turns this into a throwaway app. " Multiplayer.it said "Fun and cute like the first episode, Field Trip is way too short and with just few interesting puzzles. " 148Apps said "The next installment in the series, Jacob Jones and the Bigfoot Mystery: Episode 2 is fun but it's all too short, and ends before you get a chance to sink your teeth into it. "
