= The Killing Game Show =

1990 video game

- Developer: Raising Hell Software
- Publishers: Psygnosis (Amiga, ST); Electronic Arts (Genesis)
- Designer: Martyn Chudley
- Artists: Martyn Chudley; Pete Lyons; Jeff Bramfitt; Jim Bowers
- Composer: Ray Norrish
- Platforms: Amiga, Atari ST, Genesis
- Release: 1990: Amiga, Atari ST; 1991: Genesis
- Genre: Run and gun
- Mode: Single-player

The Killing Game Show is a run and gun video game developed by Raising Hell Software for the Amiga and Atari ST. It was published in 1990 by Psygnosis, then re-released later under the name Fatal Rewind for the Sega Genesis by Electronic Arts.

== Gameplay ==
The player controls the robo-contestant as it fights for its life, avoiding booby traps, Hostile Artificial Life Forms (H.A.L.Fs), and the ever-present rising acid. There are 12 levels.
