= The Club (video game) =

2008 video game

- British cover art
- Developer: Bizarre Creations
- Publisher: Sega
- Composers: Richard Jacques; Chris Chudley; Jesper Kyd
- Platforms: Microsoft Windows; PlayStation 3 Xbox 360
- Release: AU: February 7, 2008; EU: February 8, 2008 (PS3, X360); NA: February 19, 2008; EU: February 22, 2008 (PC)
- Genre: Third-person shooter
- Modes: Single-player, multiplayer

The Club is a third-person shooter video game developed by Bizarre Creations and published by Sega. It was released for PlayStation 3, Microsoft Windows, and Xbox 360 in February 2008. The story of the game centers on The Club, an underground blood sport controlled by a wealthy elite who place their bets on who will survive the gladiatorial-style combat. The game utilizes both racing and run-and-gun elements, where players must either complete a level quickly or defend a location from numerous enemy attacks for a set amount of time, all while accumulating their score through various kills with a bonus multiplier. It also includes eight multiplayer modes, featuring four-player local split screen or up to seven online. The Club received favorable reviews upon release.

== Plot ==
The player chooses from a roster of characters who are forced to compete in The Club, a modern form of gladiatorial combat. They are under the watchful eye of a middle-aged Englishman known as The Secretary. There are 8 characters to choose from; each with their own attributes and ending:

- Dragov: A Russian convict who is rescued by The Club after attempting an escape across the Siberian tundra. He is the strongest of the competitors, but also the slowest. The game ends with Dragov escaping The Club compound through a helicopter, killing the guards in the process.
- Renwick: A former New York detective, who lost his job after repeated attempts to locate The Club, and continued the search on his own. He is fairly well balanced, with particular attention to speed. The ending shows Renwick waking up in a derelict building - dazed and confused. He then receives a phone call from The Secretary saying he is released from The Club unharmed but is now a fugitive to law enforcement, a small price to pay for meddling with The Club's affairs.
- Finn: A gambler whose debts landed him in trouble with the mob, and resulted in his Club membership. He is also well balanced, but with a little extra emphasis on stamina. After completing The Club, he sends the money he owes to the mob with a bomb inside the briefcase, killing them in the process.
- Seager: A Canadian extreme sports junkie, who joins The Club in search of that next high. He sacrifices strength for above average speed and stamina. The Secretary thanks him for his participation and gives him his cash reward, to which he declines and simply says, "I want to play."
- Kuro: A Japanese double agent posing as a Triad Society assassin. Kuro is among the fastest competitors in The Club. He is last seen being interrogated by law enforcement, who are actually The Club members in disguise, suggesting that they intend to recruit Kuro again.
- Killen: An Australian man who survived through The Club once, only to be forced back when his daughter's life is threatened. Killen is well balanced, with an extra bump to strength. As promised, his daughter is released from custody and Killen is seen exiting the Club compound on a motorcycle.
- Adjo: An African giant who seeks to redeem his violent past, but is ultimately forced to participate in the tournament. Adjo is also one of the strongest competitors in The Club. He rudely refuses his reward money in the end, saying he wants his village to be left in peace and marches out of The Club.
- Nemo: A psychopathic Englishman who only lives to kill. Nemo is extremely fast and quite strong, but has very low stamina. It is revealed that Nemo is The Secretary's son, but when asked by the guard his true identity, The Secretary replies he is "no one."

== Gameplay ==
The Club is played from a third-person perspective. The player must make their way through a level as quickly as possible, or defend one location and survive attacks from respawning enemies for a set amount of time. Gameplay is centered on a score mechanic where each kill acts as a bonus multiplier. Various kill methods, such as ricochets, head shots, and long range shots earn extra points. After each kill, the player has several seconds to get another kill before the bonus multiplier starts to reduce. This interval also reduces the higher the multiplier gets. Icons are scattered throughout each level, offering bonuses. Weapons, ammunition and health are present but the player is not rewarded for picking them up. The Club incorporates elements from racing video games, including time attack events.

=== Multiplayer ===
The game includes eight multiplayer modes, with online leaderboards to compare scores. Online games can feature up to seven opponents on-line, or four-player local split screen.

== Development ==
The lead designer of the game was Matt Cavanagh who described the title as "a racing game with guns". At first the game was literally a shooting gallery with limited AI. After 6 months of development a new prototype was created with an emphasis on scoring rather than narrative. The gameplay was designed before any setting and back story was created. Many publishers declined to take on the title before Sega chose to back it.

The title was released globally in 2008. Composer Richard Jacques wrote the score for the single player levels, Chris Chudley from Audioantics wrote the score for the multiplayer levels, while Jesper Kyd scored the main theme.

== Reception ==
Reception

Aggregate score
Aggregator	Score		
Aggregator	PC	PS3	Xbox 360
Metacritic	67/100	72/100	76/100

Review scores
Publication	Score		
Publication	PC	PS3	Xbox 360
Destructoid	N/A	N/A	7/10
Electronic Gaming Monthly	N/A	6.17/10	6.17/10
Eurogamer	N/A	N/A	8/10
Game Informer	N/A	8.75/10	8.75/10
GamePro	N/A	N/A	4.5/5
GameRevolution	N/A	N/A	C+
GameSpot	N/A	7/10	7/10
GameSpy	N/A	3.5/5	3.5/5
GameTrailers	N/A	7.3/10	7.3/10
GameZone	6.7/10	8.2/10	8.2/10
IGN	6.9/10	(UK) 7.2/10 (US) 6.9/10	(AU) 8.4/10 (UK) 7.2/10 (US) 6.9/10
Official Xbox Magazine (US)	N/A	N/A	8/10
PC Gamer (US)	66%	N/A	N/A
PlayStation: The Official Magazine	N/A	2.5/5	N/A
411Mania	N/A	N/A	8.8/10

The Xbox 360 version received "generally favorable reviews", while the PC and PlayStation 3 versions received "average" reviews, according to the review aggregation website Metacritic.

Eurogamer's Tom Bramwell complimented the Xbox 360 version as "a shooter that turns tired genre conventions around with a bullet to the shoulder", but stated that it would be "divisive" due to its run and gun mentality, which went against the contemporary trend towards tactical shooters. Bramwell pointed out that the game "does for the third-person shooter what no one else has even bothered trying to do: moving it closer to the 2D shoot-'em-ups of old in a manner that appeals anew." Andrew Reiner, writing for Game Informer, mentioned Bizarre Creations' background and its influence on The Club, saying: "The speed-first mentality of the racing genre is cleverly infused into the framework of a run-and-gun shooter...And to truly capture the racing atmosphere, some of the levels have players running laps in specific environments...It may sound odd, but the racing shooter formula works amazingly well." Reiner called it "a nice change of pace, and hopefully the beginning of a new genre." GamePro reviewer Cameron Lewis wrote of the Xbox 360 version: "What might be most impressive about The Club is that despite the many disparate elements that it cherry-picks from genres as diverse as racing, skateboarding, and first-person shooters, the whole never bears the disjointed feel of a Frankenstein creation." IGN UK's reviewer Alec Meer stated that the scoring system "will prove an immediate turn-off for some" and went on to blame the "fairly dismal" graphics for putting potential players off, saying that "it's about how it plays, not how it looks. But if it looked better, more people would want to play it." He praised the gameplay as "it does the job it sets out to do very well", but said the game only had "specialist appeal". Edge gave it seven out of ten, calling it "a heavily structured and well-considered score-attack game."
