= Project Gotham Racing (video game) =

2001 racing video game for Xbox

- Cover art featuring a Ferrari F50
- Developer: Bizarre Creations
- Publisher: Microsoft Game Studios
- Producers: List: Martyn R. Chudley; Brian Woodhouse; Peter Wallace; Ged Talbot; Glyn Williams; Kev Reilly; Chris Pickford; Steve Gaffney; Allan Speed
- Programmers: List: Roger Perkins; Phil Snape; Edmund Clay; Keith Pickford; Sam Hall; Nick Bygrave; Steve Cakebread; Dave Al-Daini
- Artists: List: Jon Dugdale; Mark Sharratt; Derek Chapman; Julie McGurren; Paul Spencer; Glen Griffiths; David McDonald; Boz Briers; Matt Cavanagh; Stuart Jackson
- Series: Project Gotham Racing
- Platform: Xbox
- Release: NA: November 15, 2001; EU: March 14, 2002
- Genre: Racing
- Modes: Single-player, multiplayer

Project Gotham Racing is a 2001 arcade-style racing video game developed by Bizarre Creations and published by Microsoft Game Studios, released exclusively for the Xbox console as a launch title. It serves as the spiritual successor to Bizarre's Metropolis Street Racer and retains the Kudos system, which awards points for driving skills and style, necessary for progression rather than solely finishing races in first place. Races occur across four real-world cities, featuring a total of 204 unique circuits. The game achieved both critical and commercial success, launching the exclusive Project Gotham Racing series that continued with Project Gotham Racing 2 in 2003.

== Gameplay ==
Gameplay screenshot of a 2000 Mercedes-Benz SLK 320 in a race in 4th place in Asakusa, Tokyo, Japan

Project Gotham Racing features three main game modes: Kudos Challenge, Quick Race, and Arcade Race. The Kudos Challenge comprises various style events in which players can earn a gold, silver, or bronze medal by successfully achieving a specific amount of Kudos. These events include, but are not limited to, Style Challenges, where players navigate through sets of traffic cones on the track; Overtake, which requires players to surpass as many cars as possible; and Speed Challenge, where players must ensure their speedometer hits a designated target. Quick Race involves competing in various races against five computer opponents, while Arcade Race consists of an additional collection of style challenges.

=== Kudos System ===
Advancement in Project Gotham Racing, distinct from other racing games, requires players to drive fast enough to meet the challenges set while also scoring sufficient Kudos points to progress. Kudos points are earned through various driving skills, such as power sliding around corners at high speed, driving on two wheels, or overtaking non-player characters during the race. The longer a stunt is maintained, the more points the player receives. However, colliding with the guard rails or other obstacles will result in the loss of Kudos points earned from that stunt.

=== Content ===
There are a total of 29 licensed cars in Project Gotham Racing, ranging from the initially available Mini Cooper-S, Toyota MR2 Spyder, and Mercedes-Benz SLK 320 to the high-end Ferrari F50 and Porsche Carrera GT. Visible car damage, such as bumps, is present when the player's car is hit; however, this is purely aesthetic and does not affect driving performance.

The game features four realistically recreated world cities: San Francisco, London, and Tokyo, all returning from Metropolis Street Racer, alongside the newly introduced New York City. Each city is divided into three distinct districts (e.g., Fisherman's Wharf), and every district contains 17 circuits, resulting in a total of 204 configurations.

The game features 12 radio stations, five of which are based on real-life stations (HOT 97, Live 105, Capital 95.8, Xfm London 104.9, and InterFM), featuring the voices of real DJs such as Angie Martinez. The soundtrack is diverse, including Japanese language tracks and selections from obscure and underground artists.

== Development and Release ==
Bizarre Creations did not receive the financial return from Metropolis Street Racer, which was over-budget, late to market, and released shortly before the discontinuation of the Dreamcast hardware. Initially, Microsoft asked Bizarre for a conversion to their upcoming Xbox, but the developers decided to evolve the game further to create a "worthy" launch title, requiring a name change since the original title was owned by Sega.

The game was unveiled under the tentative title Project Gotham at Gamestock 2001 on March 13 of that year. The demo presented was an early build, although the fundamentals of the game were already established. The development team took over 50,000 photographs in the four real-life cities to capture every detail and design the game's environments as accurately as possible. The team was also dedicated to ensuring the game ran smoothly at 60 frames per second, even with split-screen multiplayer. Project Gotham Racing was the first racing game since Need for Speed: High Stakes to officially secure both the Ferrari and Porsche licences. Compared to Metropolis Street Racer, many high-end exotic cars were added to Project Gotham.

The Kudos mechanic also underwent slight changes in Project Gotham Racing, with points awarded based on the best attempt from multiple tries, rather than the risk-and-reward system used in Metropolis Street Racer.

== Reception ==
=== Critical ===
Reception

Aggregate score
Aggregator	Score
Metacritic	85/100

Review scores
Publication	Score
Edge	8/10
Electronic Gaming Monthly	8.5/10
Eurogamer	8/10
Famitsu	9/10, 8/10, 9/10, 7/10
Game Informer	8.5/10
GamePro	4.5/5
GameRevolution	B
GameSpot	8.1/10
GameSpy	84%
GameZone	9/10
IGN	8.8/10
Next Generation	4/5
Official Xbox Magazine (US)	9/10

Project Gotham Racing received favourable reviews according to video game review aggregator website Metacritic. NextGen stated that the game "has enough gloss, variety, and originality to compete with the genre's best and give speedfreaks a great reason to jump on the Xbox bandwagon."

In 2005, then-chairman of Microsoft, Bill Gates, described Project Gotham Racing as his favourite game.

=== Accolades ===
The game was nominated for GameSpot's annual "Best Xbox Game" and, among console games, "Best Driving Game" awards; these honors ultimately went to Halo: Combat Evolved and Gran Turismo 3: A-Spec, respectively. During the 5th Annual Interactive Achievement Awards, the Academy of Interactive Arts & Sciences nominated Project Gotham Racing for the "Console Racing" award, which ultimately went to Gran Turismo 3: A-Spec.

=== Sales ===
The game sold over 1 million units globally by July 2002, making it the joint-second best-selling game (alongside Dead or Alive 3) to reach this milestone after Halo: Combat Evolved. By July 2006, it had sold 1.2 million copies and earned $44 million in the U.S. NextGen ranked it as the 43rd highest-selling game launched for the PlayStation 2, Xbox, or GameCube in the U.S. between January 2000 and July 2006. Combined sales of the Project Gotham Racing franchise reached 2.1 million units in the U.S. by July 2006.

== Legacy and series ==
Project Gotham Racing launched a series that became Microsoft's flagship racing game franchise on Xbox. The final main title, Project Gotham Racing 4, was released around the time Bizarre Creations was acquired by Activision. Following this acquisition, Bizarre Creations announced that PGR4 would be the last game produced for Microsoft, effectively leading to Forza Motorsport replacing it as Xbox's flagship racing franchise.

== See also ==
- Burnout
- Forza
- Metropolis Street Racer
- Ridge Racer V
