= Lucid Games =

British video game developer

Lucid Games Limited
- Company type: Subsidiary
- Industry: Video games
- Predecessor: Bizarre Creations
- Founded: 21 February 2011; 14 years ago
- Founders: Mark Craig; Andy Davidson; Chris Davie; Nick Davies; Craig Howard; Jeff Lewis; Paul Morrissey; Pete O'Brien; Pete Wallace; Chad Wright
- Headquarters: Liverpool, England
- Key people: Pete Wallace (managing director); Brian Woodhouse (head of business development)
- Number of employees: >150 (2021)
- Parent: Lucid Entertainment Group (2020–2023); LightSpeed Studios (2023–present)
- Website: Official website

Lucid Games Limited is a British video game developer based in Liverpool. The studio was founded in February 2011 by former employees of Bizarre Creations, which had been shut down a week earlier. Games developed by Lucid Games include Geometry Wars 3: Dimensions (2014) and Destruction AllStars (2021).

== History ==
=== Background ===
Lucid Games was founded by Mark Craig, Andy Davidson, Chris Davie, Nick Davies, Craig Howard, Jeff Lewis, Paul Morrissey, Pete O'Brien, Pete Wallace, and Chad Wright. Most of them had previously been employed at the developer Bizarre Creations in various capacities, including Wallace as development manager and O'Brien as senior producer. Following the poor commercial performance of its game Blur, Bizarre Creations' parent company, Activision, had sought to sell the studio but was unsuccessful in finding a buyer, consequently announcing in January 2011 that it would shut down the studio. According to Wallace, Bizarre Creations' staff had been aware of impending layoffs but had not expected the studio to be closed. Bizarre Creations was disestablished on 18 February 2011, leaving 200 people unemployed.

=== Founding ===
Lucid Games was subsequently formed in Liverpool on 21 February 2011. Wallace and Davidson became the new company's managing director and commercial director, respectively. The establishment was supported by Liverpool Vision, a local economic development company that sought to keep Bizarre Creations' talent in the Liverpool area. Wallace stated that he intended for Lucid Games to "get back to the levels of innovation and creativity at Bizarre [Creations] that made Activision so keen to acquire it" and hoped to employ up to fifty former Bizarre Creations staff. Within its first year, the company grew from eight employees to twenty-eight and moved from a temporary office to a permanent one in the Liverpool city centre.

Lucid Games hired Brian Woodhouse, Bizarre Creations' former studio director, as head business development in July 2016. By 2019, the company had grown past 100 employees. In October 2020, Lucid Games and its separately held publishing arm, Lucid Publishing, were organised as subsidiaries of Lucid Group Entertainment. In July 2023, the Tencent subsidiary Lightspeed Studios acquired Lucid Games.

== Games developed ==
Year	Title	Platform(s)	Publisher(s)	Notes	Ref(s).
2012	Travel Bug	PlayStation Vita	Sony Computer Entertainment		
2012	Pixel Smash: Christmas Edition	Android, iOS	Lucid Games		
2013	Jacob Jones and the Bigfoot Mystery: Episode 1 – A Bump in the Night	Android, iOS, Microsoft Windows, PlayStation Vita	Sony Computer Entertainment, Lucid Games		
2013	2K Drive	iOS	2K Sports		
2013	Santa's Magic Sack	Android, iOS	Lucid Games		
2014	iFruit	PlayStation Vita	Rockstar Games	Port development	
2014	PlayStation Vita Pets: Puppy Parlour	Android, iOS	Sony Computer Entertainment		
2014	Jacob Jones and the Bigfoot Mystery: Episode 2 – Field Trip!	Android, iOS, Microsoft Windows	Lucid Games		
2014	Geometry Wars 3: Dimensions	Android, iOS, Linux, macOS, Microsoft Windows, PlayStation 3, PlayStation 4, PlayStation Vita, Xbox 360, Xbox One	Activision, Aspyr		
2015	Goat Simulator	PlayStation 3, PlayStation 4, Xbox 360, Xbox One	Double Eleven	Port co-development	
2015	Happy Happy Donuts	Android, iOS	Lucid Games		
2015	Grand Theft Auto: Liberty City Stories	Android, Fire OS, iOS	Rockstar Games	Port development	
2016	We're Going on a Bear Hunt	Android, Fire OS, iOS	Channel 4		
2018	Switchblade	PlayStation 4	Lucid Publishing		
2021	Destruction AllStars	PlayStation 5	Sony Interactive Entertainment		
2023	Sea of Thieves	Xbox One, Xbox Series X/S	Xbox Game Studios	Support Studio	
