= Bizarre Creations =

British video game development studio, 1988–2011

Bizarre Creations Limited
- Formerly: Raising Hell Software Limited (1988–1994)
- Company type: Subsidiary
- Industry: Video games
- Founded: 1988; 38 years ago
- Founder: Martyn Chudley
- Defunct: 2011; 15 years ago
- Headquarters: Liverpool, England
- Key people: Martyn Chudley (managing director); Brian Woodhouse (studio head)
- Products: Formula One series; Geometry Wars series; Project Gotham Racing series; Blur
- Number of employees: 200 (2011)
- Parent: Microsoft Game Studios (minority stake, 2001–2007); Activision (2007–2011)
- Website: www.bizarrecreations.com

Bizarre Creations Limited was a British video game development studio based in Liverpool, best known for its racing titles Metropolis Street Racer (Dreamcast) and the follow-up Project Gotham Racing series (Xbox, Xbox 360, mobile phones and Zune HD). The company has also developed games in other genres, including the Geometry Wars arcade series, plus the third-person shooters Fur Fighters and The Club. Bizarre Creations was acquired by publisher Activision in 2007, and subsequently completed its racer Blur in May 2010.

On 20 January 2011, Activision announced Bizarre Creations would close, and later confirmed the date. Bizarre marked the closure by releasing a retrospective video of its work.

== History ==
A screenshot taken from Metropolis Street Racer on the Dreamcast showing the Bizarre Creations logo used during the year 2000–2001

Bizarre Creations started as Raising Hell Software, founded by Martyn Chudley. Sega scorned "Hell", and the company went nameless for a short time. In 1994, a pending submission to Psygnosis/Sony forced the decision of a new name. The founder tentatively left "Weird Concepts" on the submission documentation. Then a staff member used Microsoft Word's thesaurus, and "Bizarre Creations" stuck.

The Bizarre Creations team was initially five strong, and worked on a concept project called "Slaughter". After seeing the demo, Psygnosis signed the team onto Formula 1 for PlayStation. Formula 1 went on to become the best-selling game in Europe in 1996.

On 26 September 2007, publisher Activision acquired Bizarre Creations for $107.4m; $67.4m immediately payable with a further $40m contingent hitting certain goals over a 5-year period.

Activision announced that Project Gotham Racing 4 would be Bizarre Creations' last game for Microsoft Game Studios, and Microsoft did retain the rights for the Project Gotham Racing franchise.

On 16 November 2010, Activision announced it was considering closing Bizarre and "exploring our options regarding the future of the studio, including a potential sale of the business". Activision later stated that no buyer could be found and that the studio would close. The studio would conclude with a two-minute farewell video, put together by in-house editor Eamon Urtone.

Pete Collier, Ben Ward and Stephen Cakebread of Bizarre Creations founded mobile game developer Hogrocket in 2011, and shut it down the following year. A week after the closure of the studio, many former employees went on to found Lucid Games, which continued development on the Geometry Wars franchise, among various other ventures.

== Games developed ==
Year	Title	Platform(s)
as Raising Hell Software
1988	Combat Crazy	Commodore 64
1990	The Killing Game Show	Amiga, Atari ST, Sega Mega Drive
1993	Wiz 'n' Liz	Amiga, Sega Mega Drive
as Bizarre Creations
1996	Formula 1	PlayStation, Microsoft Windows
1997	Formula 1 97	PlayStation, Microsoft Windows
2000	Fur Fighters	Dreamcast, Microsoft Windows, PlayStation 2
2000	Metropolis Street Racer	Dreamcast
2001	Project Gotham Racing	Xbox
2002	Treasure Planet	Game Boy Advance, PlayStation 2
2003	Project Gotham Racing 2	Xbox
2005	Geometry Wars: Retro Evolved	Xbox 360, Microsoft Windows
2005	Project Gotham Racing 3	Xbox 360
2007	Boom Boom Rocket	Xbox 360
2007	Project Gotham Racing 4	Xbox 360
2007	Geometry Wars: Galaxies	Wii, Nintendo DS
2008	The Club	Microsoft Windows, PlayStation 3, Xbox 360
2008	Geometry Wars: Retro Evolved 2	Xbox 360
2010	Geometry Wars: Touch	iOS
2010	Blur	Microsoft Windows, PlayStation 3, Xbox 360
2010	James Bond 007: Blood Stone	Microsoft Windows, PlayStation 3, Xbox 360

=== Cancelled Games ===
- Blur 2
