= Project Gotham Racing =

Video game series

- Logo for Project Gotham Racing 4
- Genre: Racing
- Developers: Bizarre Creations; Glu Mobile; Pixelbite
- Publishers: Microsoft Game Studios; Glu Mobile
- Platforms: Xbox, Xbox 360, Dreamcast, mobile phone, Zune HD
- First release: Project Gotham Racing; November 15, 2001
- Latest release: Project Gotham Racing: Ferrari Edition; November 11, 2009

Project Gotham Racing (PGR) is a series of racing video games published by Microsoft Studios, with four main titles all of which were developed by Bizarre Creations. It is the spiritual successor to Bizarre Creations' previous game Metropolis Street Racer, released by Sega for the Dreamcast in 2000. The PGR series was released on the Xbox and Xbox 360, with spin-offs appearing on mobile phones.

== Gameplay ==
The PGR series have a system called Kudos points. These are given for performing stunts with the vehicle (such as power sliding, overtaking another driver, two wheels, etc.). The longer the stunt is maintained, the more points the player receives. Colliding with the guard rails and other surroundings will cause the Kudos points from that stunt to be lost. PGR2, PGR3 and PGR4 supported direct network gameplay via Xbox Live.

The cover of each game in the Project Gotham Racing franchise has featured a Ferrari car on it, going from the F50 (PGR) to the Enzo (PGR2), the F430 (PGR3), and the 599 GTB Fiorano (PGR4). The car manufacturer was even the main focus of a free mobile entry in the series, PGR: Ferrari Edition for the Zune HD, similar to that of Porsche in Need for Speed: Porsche Unleashed.

== Titles and history ==
Release timeline
2000	Metropolis Street Racer (Dreamcast)
2001	Project Gotham Racing (Xbox)
2002
2003	Project Gotham Racing 2 (Xbox)
2004
2005	Project Gotham Racing 3 (Xbox 360)
2006	Project Gotham Racing Mobile (J2ME)
2007	Project Gotham Racing 4 (Xbox 360) Project Gotham Racing (Symbian, Windows Mobile)
2008
2009	Project Gotham Racing: Ferrari Edition (Zune HD)

The first Project Gotham Racing was released as a launch title for Xbox on November 15, 2001. It became a success and led to more sequels, becoming Microsoft's flagship racing game franchise on Xbox.

In December 2006, a mobile version was released for J2ME mobile phones. Another mobile version, simply called Project Gotham Racing in 2007, was released for Symbian and Windows Mobile devices. On November 11, 2009, Project Gotham Racing: Ferrari Edition was released for the Zune HD.

The final main title, Project Gotham Racing 4, was released around the time Bizarre Creations was acquired by Activision. Following this acquisition, in September 2007, Bizarre Creations announced that PGR4 would be the last game produced for Microsoft, effectively leading to Forza Motorsport replacing it as Xbox's flagship racing franchise. Bizarre developed PGR4's spiritual successor, Blur, which was released on Xbox 360, PlayStation 3 and Microsoft Windows. before the studio was shuttered by Activision in 2011. The developers of Forza Horizon originally intended to reboot the franchise; however, for unknown reasons, this proposal was reportedly turned down by Microsoft.

== Reception ==
Aggregate review scores
Game	Metacritic
Project Gotham Racing	85/100
Project Gotham Racing 2	90/100
Project Gotham Racing 3	88/100
Project Gotham Racing 4	85/100

Every main Project Gotham Racing game was a critical success.
