= Blur (video game) =

2010 racing video game

- Box art featuring a Ford GT and BMW Concept 1 Series tii
- Developer: Bizarre Creations (Note: Additional work by Virtuos, China West Coast Tech Co., Ltd., XPEC Entertainment, Blade Games World, Activision Central Studios, Agora Games and Demonware)
- Publisher: Activision
- Engine: Horizon
- Platforms: Microsoft Windows; PlayStation 3; Xbox 360
- Release: NA: May 25, 2010; AU: May 26, 2010; EU: May 28, 2010
- Genres: Racing, vehicular combat
- Modes: Single-player, multiplayer

Blur (stylized as blur) is a 2010 arcade-style racing vehicular combat video game for Microsoft Windows, PlayStation 3 and Xbox 360. It was developed by Bizarre Creations and published by Activision. Blur features a racing style that incorporates real world cars and locales with arcade style handling and vehicular combat. The game is a spiritual successor to the Project Gotham Racing series. Blur was the penultimate game developed by Bizarre Creations before they were shut down by Activision in February 2011.

== Gameplay ==
Blur gameplay screenshot of a Nissan Navara during a Destruction event within Career mode (Windows version)

The gameplay in Blur is centered on vehicular combat. The game tracks present eight different powerups that the cars can pick up. Each car can carry a maximum of three powerups at any given time, that they can then switch and activate at will, or discard. Out of the eight powerups, five of them are weapons, with the remaining ones being a defensive shield, a repair wrench that restores any damage that the car may have sustained, and a nitrous boost. Several of the weapons' behavior can be modified to select whether the player wants them to fire forwards or backwards, and most of them can also be used defensively against attacks from other cars.

In Blur's career mode, the player will be consulted by Shannon (voiced by Natalie Lander) to encounter numerous characters and many licensed cars such as the Dodge Viper and the Lotus Exige, as well as tuned cars such as the Ford Supervan fitted with an F1 engine. Each car presents its own unique traits such as Acceleration, Speed, Drift, Grip and Stability. Some special car models have been designed by Bizarre Creations themselves. Albeit simplified, the tracks are also based on real-world environments, such as the Los Angeles river canals and several parts of London. Depending on the character(s) the player races against or tags along with in team races, they will have their own racing styles, power-up setups, match types, locales and cars. As the player reaches the podium in races, performs stunts and uses power-ups in certain ways, they will gain 'fan points'. These points help the player progress through the career, purchase more cars and parts and earn more fans for the user base. Also, during the career, players will encounter fan icons along the tracks. Driving through these will trigger short challenges (e.g. shooting another car with a certain weapon, or performing a long drift), which will reward the player with a fan points boost.

During the career mode, each challenge features a final boss, which, once defeated will yield access to their specific mods (mods being upgrades that provide enhanced functionality to a standard powerup e.g. Khan's titanium shield), and customized cars. At the final boss challenge, all the bosses meet together for a final race.

=== Multiplayer ===
The game can be played with up to four players in split screen, and can be taken online for a maximum of 20 players over the internet, or over LAN in the PC, Xbox 360, and PlayStation 3 versions. In a custom game, options can be set before each match that determine the layout of power-ups, car classes, number of laps, and the car to race. A match type called "World Tour" is essentially a quick play option for players who want to jump into a match. Here, every player is given a random car and thrown into a random series of courses with a standard ruleset. Multiplayer also offers "Team Racing" mode. Two teams (Alpha & Omega) can put themselves head to head either publicly or private. During races, each player accumulates points for their finishing position. While in team racing, powerups will not affect the player's own team members with the exception of Shock. Players can send a racing challenge to an online friend. If the second player beats the time, they can send the updated challenge back. These challenges go back and forth until one person concedes. Players can also use the Share button, and post their achievements to Twitter and Facebook.

== Development ==
A trailer and tips video for the game on Xbox Live mentioned a feature that never made it to the final game. The feature, called "double tap", was meant to allow a player to combine several powerups of the same type for a more powerful effect, by double tapping the special power use button. The video was removed near the release of the game and little, if any, mention of the feature, seems to have been made again. The "double tap" feature was not present in the free multiplayer demo of the game offered on Xbox Live.

=== Cut content ===
Blur was officially announced by Activision in May 2009 as Bizarre Creations' first major project following their acquisition by the publisher. Having spent years developing the Project Gotham Racing franchise, the studio aimed to create a new experience that combined the realistic driving mechanics of traditional racing simulators with the fast-paced, item-based combat typically found in kart racers.

During the development process, the team faced significant challenges regarding car licensing. Because Blur heavily featured vehicular combat and explosions, several real-world automobile manufacturers were initially hesitant to allow their licensed vehicles to be depicted taking severe visual damage. To test the game's servers and balance the power-ups, Activision launched a public multiplayer beta for the Xbox 360 in March 2010 before the official release.

== Reception ==
Reception

Aggregate score
Aggregator	Score		
Aggregator	PC	PS3	Xbox 360
Metacritic	81/100	81/100	82/100

Review scores
Publication	Score		
Publication	PC	PS3	Xbox 360
Eurogamer	N/A	N/A	8/10
Famitsu	N/A	29/40	(X360) 31/40; 29/40
Game Informer	8.5/10	8.5/10	8.5/10
GamePro	N/A	N/A	4.5/5
GameRevolution	B−	B−	B−
GameSpot	8/10	8/10	8/10
GameTrailers	N/A	8.7/10	8.7/10
Giant Bomb	N/A	4/5	4/5
IGN	7/10	7/10	(UK) 9/10 (US) 7/10
Joystiq	N/A	N/A	4/5
Official Xbox Magazine (US)	N/A	N/A	9/10
PC Gamer (UK)	78%	N/A	N/A
PlayStation: The Official Magazine	N/A	4.5/5	N/A
The Telegraph	N/A	N/A	9/10
411Mania	N/A	N/A	8.4/10
Teletext GameCentral	N/A	N/A	7/10

The game received "favorable" reviews on all platforms according to the review aggregation website Metacritic. In Japan, Famitsu gave it a score of 29 out of 40, while Famitsu X360 gave the Xbox 360 version a score of three eights and one seven for a total of 31 out of 40.

Edge gave the Xbox 360 version a score of eight out of ten, saying that it "Provides too little in the way of engaging structure behind its exemplary racing to make it more than a series of thrilling rides." However, GameZone gave the game 7.5 out of 10, saying, "On single-player, Blur is an average racing game with a powered-up twist. Repeating races and receiving beautiful cars that remain untouched due to the lack of customization gets old fast. The outdated rave-vibe, including the music and menus, don't do the presentation any favors either. As a multiplayer title, Blur is absolutely exhilarating."

=== Sales ===
In the US, Blur sold 31,000 units in its first five days of release according to the NPD. The game ultimately sold 500,000 units.

Despite disappointing sales, Nick Davies of Bizarre Creations had announced in July 2010 that the studio intended to create more games in the series, and wanted to make it the biggest racing franchise. He attributed the sales performance of Blur to the fact that the game was released at "a very busy time for racing games", and that it "came out at the same time as ModNation Racers and Split/Second." However, he believed "that the strong multiplayer component would give the game staying power", and "it's going to be a slow-burner".

On February 18, 2011, Activision announced that it was closing Bizarre Creations, stating:

Over the past three years since our purchase of Bizarre Creations, the fundamentals of the racing genre have changed significantly. Although we made a substantial investment in creating a new IP, Blur, it did not find a commercial audience. Bizarre is a very talented team of developers, however, because of the broader economic factors impacting the market, we are exploring our options regarding the future of the studio, including a potential sale of the business.

== Sequels ==
A sequel was planned for Blur, and work had started on it using an all-new engine, but it was cancelled when Bizarre Creations was shut down by Activision. Work-in-progress videos of the intended sequel were released post-mortem, one of which show a race in Blur's Brighton track, adding a rainstorm, another that shows an Audi R8 racing in a track set in Dubai, showcasing the ability to temporarily drive sideways on the facade of a curved building, and another of an Ultima GTR racing down a snow-capped mountain during an avalanche.

On October 25, 2013 a free-to-play spin-off mobile game called Blur Overdrive was released on Android, developed by Nottingham based App Crowd, and distributed by Marmalade, who licensed the Blur brand from Activision. An iOS version was released on November 1, 2013. Blur: Overdrive uses a top-down perspective and features eight different power-ups and six cars, which can be upgraded individually in ten steps. Touchscreen controls allow to choose from a floating steering wheel, a slide bar or a virtual pad. Player mods and Power Up mods are not connected to the car upgrading system and change how power-ups influence the combat.
