= Geometry Wars: Retro Evolved 2 =

2008 video game

- Developer: Bizarre Creations
- Publishers: Microsoft Game Studios; Activision
- Designer: Stephen Cakebread
- Composer: Chris Chudley
- Series: Geometry Wars
- Platforms: Xbox 360, iOS
- Release: XBLA; July 30, 2008; Touch; April 1, 2010
- Genre: Multi-directional shooter
- Modes: Single-player, multiplayer

Geometry Wars: Retro Evolved 2 is a multidirectional shooter developed by Bizarre Creations and published by Microsoft Game Studios and Activision. It was released on Xbox Live Arcade on July 30, 2008 as a sequel to Geometry Wars: Retro Evolved. It was followed by Geometry Wars 3: Dimensions, a sequel published in 2014 by Lucid Games, which was founded by former members of Bizarre Creations.

== Gameplay ==
Sequence mode. The player (white, center) must shoot swarms of blue enemies while avoiding them simultaneously.

The player controls a maneuverable claw-shaped figure, which is officially called "Ship", that can move and fire independently in any direction.The objective of the game is to score points by destroying a variety of enemy shapes which spawn around the playing field, contact with any enemy results in death and the loss of a life. Bombs destroy all enemies on the playing field but award no points.

Crucial to effective play is the score multiplier, which increases as the player collects "geoms", small green objects dropped by enemies upon destruction. The number of points scored by destroying an enemy depends on the multiplier, which can reach into the thousands.

There are six different game modes available:

- Deadline: The player must score as many points as possible with a time limit of three minutes and unlimited lives.
- King: The player has only one life and no bombs. Circular safety zones appear sporadically in the playing field; enemies and geoms cannot enter the zones, while the player can only shoot inside them. Zones shrink and disappear after being entered, forcing players to move between zones to survive and collect geoms.
- Evolved: Similar in style to Geometry Wars: Retro Evolved, the player is challenged to score as many points as possible with a finite number of lives and bombs, with no time limit. Additional lives are earned at set point breaks.
- Pacifism: The player has one life and cannot shoot. To avoid large swarms of slow-moving blue enemies, the player must fly through gates, which explode and destroy nearby enemies upon contact. This mode was inspired by an achievement in the first game called "Pacifist" where the objective was to survive for 60 seconds without firing.
- Waves: The player has one life and must avoid and destroy inline waves of orange 'rocket' enemies that pace horizontally and vertically from the edges of the playing field. This mode was introduced as a minigame inside Project Gotham Racing 4.
- Sequence: The mode consists of twenty sequential, predetermined levels with 30 seconds allotted per level. Points are awarded for successfully destroying all enemies in each level without death and under the time limit.

Retro Evolved 2 provides local cooperative and competitive multiplayer modes for two to four players simultaneously, and an exclusive "Co-Pilot" mode in which two players control the same ship, with one moving and the other firing. Additionally, the game provides support for worldwide leaderboards in each game mode and, by default, displays the player's ranking against their friends during play.

== Development history ==
In developing the sequel the team struggled with creating a graphic style that was new but still evocative of the first game. Stephen Cakebread spoke of the challenge in an interview with Joystiq: "One of our big things was when people came to our stations we wanted them to say 'Oh, is that a sequel to Geometry Wars?' rather than 'Is that Geometry Wars?' It took us quite a while to come up with something that really work". Initially the team experimented with "all manner of weird fractal stuff" but this was discarded as being too confusing. In designing the gameplay Cakebread read fan made strategy guides and designed elements for the sequel that would take players out of their comfort zone. One of these elements was the inclusion of collectable geoms that act as score multipliers. With the introduction of the geoms the team simplified the gun from the first game, specifically its evolving nature, which would cause the players guns to shoot at different speed. According to Cakebread, the evolving gun served a similar purpose in the first game requiring that players change up their strategy, with geoms in the sequel this was made redundant and thus taken out.

Many modes were left out in the final game leaving only what Craig Howard referred to as "pure" modes. These included several multiplayer only modes, one of which was a soccer style mode where players would have to shoot an object into a gravity well on the opposite side of the screen. The developers threw out this mode as they felt that it wouldn't keep players coming back for more.

=== Geometry Wars: Touch ===
An iOS port of the game was released in 2010 entitled Geometry Wars: Touch. It added a seventh game mode, Titans, which had gameplay similar to Asteroids, but removed the multiplayer functionality entirely.

== Reception ==
Reception

Aggregate score
Aggregator	Score	
Aggregator	iOS	Xbox 360
Metacritic	81/100	90/100

Review scores
Publication	Score	
Publication	iOS	Xbox 360
The A.V. Club	N/A	B+
Destructoid	9/10	N/A
Eurogamer	N/A	9/10
GamePro	4/5	4.5/5
GameRevolution	N/A	A−
GameSpot	N/A	9/10
Gamezebo	3.5/5	N/A
Giant Bomb	N/A	5/5
IGN	7.5/10	8.3/10
MacLife	4/5	N/A
Official Xbox Magazine (US)	N/A	9/10
Pocket Gamer	3.5/5	N/A
The Guardian	N/A	4/5
TouchArcade	4/5	N/A
411Mania	N/A	7/10
Common Sense Media	3/5	N/A

Geometry Wars: Retro Evolved 2 received "universal acclaim", while Geometry Wars: Touch received "favorable" reviews, according to the review aggregation website Metacritic.

Critics praised the Xbox 360 version's multiple game modes while also collectively bemoaning the lack of online multiplayer. GameDaily said that the sequel "beats its predecessor in every way" and proclaimed it the best title on Xbox Live Arcade. Eurogamer wrote: "The omission of online play aside, Geometry Wars 2 is everything you hoped it would be." IGN called it "a solid sequel". VideoGamer.com raved: "If you love Geometry Wars you'll love this. If you've never played Geometry Wars before then now is a perfect time to do so." GameSpot enthusiastically stated that the game "takes adrenaline-soaked, addictive shooters to a level of unprecedented awesomeness".

CVG said: "There aren't many games that make your heart race like Geometry Wars does", but cautioned "the feeling that it's all been toned down leaves a sour taste in our mouths." 1Up.com's Nick Suttner said: "All of the new modes are great, but none feel quite as balanced or as fresh as Retro Evolved."

Retro Gamer gave it 98%, saying, "Incredibly detailed and filled with all manner of pretty effects, Retro Evolved 2's eye-popping visuals are complemented by a throbbing soundtrack that perfectly matches the on-screen mayhem. Yes, the lack of online play is a missed opportunity, but it's hard to imagine how Bizarre can take these core mechanics and improve on them for a sequel. We can't wait to see it try though." Edge gave it a score of nine out of ten, saying, "It may be pulled together from no more than shards of light, but few games manage to be both a science and an art." GameZone gave Geometry Wars: Touch 7.5 out of 10, saying, "As a port to Apple's i-devices, Geometry Wars: Touch is a great addition to anyone's portable game library. The only hardship is the controls take a long time to get used to, but as we've found in our testing and just by looking at the leaderboards, it can be done."

IGN editor Cam Shea ranked it fourth on his top 10 list of Xbox Live Arcade games. He praised the quality of the returning game modes from Geometry Wars, also praising the newly added ones.

Since its release, Geometry Wars: Retro Evolved 2 sold 485,950 units by January 2011. Sales of said game moved up to 598,509 units by the end of 2011.
