= Project Gotham Racing 2 =

2003 video game

- Cover art featuring a Ferrari Enzo with the Sydney Opera House in view
- Developer: Bizarre Creations
- Publisher: Microsoft Game Studios
- Directors: Craig Cook; Philipp Teschner
- Producers: Peter Wallace; Brian Woodhouse; Allan Speed
- Designer: Martyn R. Chudley
- Programmer: Roger Perkins
- Artists: Gren Atherton; Kiki Wolfkill; Alex Hillman
- Series: Project Gotham Racing
- Platform: Xbox
- Release: 2003
- Genre: Racing
- Modes: Single-player, multiplayer

Project Gotham Racing 2 is a 2003 arcade-style racing video game developed by Bizarre Creations and published by Microsoft Game Studios. It was released exclusively for the Xbox in 2003 as the successor to 2001's Project Gotham Racing.

Development began shortly after the completion of the first game and was first made official in August 2002. Bill Gates himself had emailed suggestions to the developer team of what he wished to see in it. The Kudos system, challenges set, available cars, and the tracks around which players race were expanded greatly from the original. The Kudos system was made to be slightly more forgiving than before and expanded to include new moves like drafting a rival or performing a 360. Alongside the 10 new real-world cities (and the Nürburgring) track, two additional packs were released as DLC.

Project Gotham Racing 2 was critically acclaimed and is often considered one of the Xbox's greatest exclusive titles. It was followed up by Project Gotham Racing 3 in 2005.

== Gameplay ==
Gameplay screenshot of a 2003 Ford Mustang SVT Cobra in a race in 5th place in Yokohama, Kanagawa, Japan

As with its predecessor, the route to advancement in Project Gotham Racing 2 differs from most racing games, requiring a combination of driving fast enough to meet the challenge set, and scoring enough Kudos points to advance. Binning the previous cities, the game features Hong Kong, Barcelona, Moscow, Edinburgh, Washington D.C, Chicago, Florence, Sydney, Yokohama, Stockholm, and Nurburgring, designed to be as close as possible to real-life. There are over 120 cars available. Despite a significant upgrade in visuals, the game runs at half (30) the framerate of the original game.

There were demo versions of Project Gotham Racing 2 made for the 2004 North American International Auto Show with game kiosks featuring two different versions of the game. One titled "Chrysler 300 Edition" with the Chrysler 300 being a playable car, another version titled "Dodge Magnum Edition" which had the Dodge Magnum as a playable car. These cars were never officially released in-game nor as downloadable content via Xbox Live.

=== Single-player ===
There are four main parts to the single player game: Kudos World Series, Arcade Racing and Time Attack.

In Kudos World Series the player has to complete a series of races in 14 different categories of car. The player begins with just three cars in the Compact Sports Series and eventually can have access to 102 cars (118 cars after purchase of the downloadable content). Most cars can be bought in exchange for kudos tokens, although some can only be obtained by completing enough races at a high level. Each car is made from around 10,000 polygons and was recorded with eight microphones in order to accurately replicate engine, turbo, exhaust, and transmission sound in-game.

In Arcade Racing there are 60 medals available, with 20 medals each for street racing, timed runs and cone challenges. Each race is with a preset car and track. Time Attack does not use kudos; the aim is for the player to try to get round the circuits as fast as possible. The player can either choose circuit or car challenges. In circuit challenge the player can choose from a selection of up to 92 circuits and then choose any car to race in. In car challenge the player can choose from a selection of up to 102 cars and race on a predetermined circuit. In both styles circuits and cars may only be chosen if they have previously been unlocked in kudos world series or arcade racing. If the player enters the showroom, it can view and test drive all cars on a test track. The players can also race against a ghost car that got the record time.

Challenges are divided into five difficulties: Steel (novice), Bronze (easy), Silver (medium), Gold (hard), and Platinum (expert).

=== Online ===
In line with other online-enabled games on the Xbox, multiplayer on Xbox Live was available to players until 15 April 2010. Project Gotham Racing 2 is now playable online again on the replacement Xbox Live servers called Insignia.

Unlike many other Xbox Live enabled games, Project Gotham Racing 2's online multiplayer ranking system is solely based on the kudos earned online. Ones kudos rank cannot go down, only up. In this way, one's rank does not necessarily reflect their skill. The scores from the various single-player challenges are able to be uploaded to Xbox Live and be compared with other players if the player is signed in.

=== Geometry Wars ===
Within the player's car garage, an arcade cabinet can be interacted with to play the classic minigame Geometry Wars, a top-down multidirectional shooter. This marked the first appearance to the public of what would become an entire series of similar games.

== Downloadable content ==
Microsoft released two downloadable content packages for Project Gotham Racing 2: the Paris Booster Pack (released in May 2004), featuring eight new cars and seven tracks in Paris, France, and the Long Beach Booster Pack (released in June 2004) with eight new cars and eight tracks based around Long Beach, California, United States.

== Reception ==
Reception

Aggregate score
Aggregator	Score
Metacritic	90/100

Review scores
Publication	Score
Edge	7/10
Electronic Gaming Monthly	9.5/10
Eurogamer	9/10 (Tom); 8/10 (Kristan)
Famitsu	(FamXB) 34/40; 32/40
Game Informer	8.75/10
GamePro	4.5/5
GameRevolution	B+
GameSpot	8.7/10
GameSpy	5/5
GameZone	9.8/10
IGN	9.5/10
Official Xbox Magazine (US)	9.4/10

Project Gotham Racing 2 received "universal acclaim" according to video game review aggregator website Metacritic In Japan, Famitsu gave it a score of all four eights for a total of 32 out of 40, while Famitsu Xbox gave it one ten, one nine, one eight, and one seven, for a total of 34 out of 40.

During the AIAS' 7th Annual Interactive Achievement Awards, Project Gotham Racing 2 received a nomination for "Console Racing Game of the Year".

== See also ==
- FM Yokohama – a Japanese FM radio station featured in the game
