= Dream Build Play =

Microsoft game development contest

Dream Build Play (also known as Dream-Build-Play, Dream.Build.Play, and DreamBuildPlay) is an annual $75,000 Microsoft video game contest used to promote Microsoft XNA Game Studio and eventually Xbox LIVE Indie Games. It was announced in 2006, started in 2007, and ran until 2012. In 2008 and 2009 it spanned over 100 countries and in 2010 it spanned 110 countries. It was restarted in 2017 as the Dream.Build.Play 2017 Challenge. Notable winners include Dust: An Elysian Tail and The Dishwasher: Dead Samurai.

== Concept ==
Dream-Build-Play, as it was first called, is a game development contest designed to promote and encourage experienced game developers and enthusiasts to create innovative and fun-to-play indie games for Windows and Xbox 360 using Microsoft XNA Game Studio. In 2017, the contest was relaunched to challenge indie game developers to create UWP games across four categories.

== Notable entries ==
Many winners have gone on to be published on Xbox LIVE Arcade:

- A.R.E.S.: Extinction Agenda (Entered as A.R.E.S.)
- Blazing Birds
- Capsized
- Cloudberry Kingdom
- Dust: An Elysian Tail
- Kung Fu Strike (Entered as HurricaneX, HurricaneX2, and HurricaneX2 Evolution in three separate Dream Build Play contests.)
- The Adventures of Shuggy (Entered as Shuggy.)
- The Bridge
- The Dishwasher: Dead Samurai
- Yo Ho Kablammo!
- Zeit²

== Dream Build Play Challenges ==
Here is a breakdown of all Dream Build Play Challenges, including lesser known Warm-Up Challenges:

=== 2007 Warm-Up Challenge ===
Microsoft offered a Relatives of Spacewar Warm-Up Challenge precursor to the first Dream Build Play, awarding US$500 to the top five entries. The entries had to create a game based on the Spacewar Starter Kit.

==== Winners ====
Top 5:

- Earth vs. Mars (Minsk, Belarus)
- Udder Assault (Bellevue, WA USA)
- G, (Bologna, Italy)
- Viduce (Lyon, France)
- Cracklin Crackles (Chicago, IL USA)

=== 2007 Challenge ===
Also known as Dream-Build-Play 1.0, this is the first Dream Build Play Challenge. In it, Microsoft offered an Xbox LIVE Arcade publishing contract to the top four entries out of 4,500 participants, with the top two "1st Place" winning $10,000 each and the next two "2nd Place" winning $5,000 each.

==== Winners ====
1st Place (tie):

- Blazing Birds (Burlington, Canada)
- The Dishwasher: Dead Samurai (Remix) (Marcy, NY, United States)

2nd Place:

- Gravitron Ultra (Stockholm, Sweden)
- Yo Ho Kablammo! (Huddersfield, United Kingdom)

3rd Place:

- Big Sky (Durban, South Africa)
- Burning Angels (Beijing, China)
- Chaos (San Diego, CA, United States)
- Gunstyle (Montgomery, AL, United States)
- Hasta la muerte (Angoulême, France)
- Hippocrate's Dilemma (Guilderland, NY, United States)
- HurricaneX (Shanghai, China)
- Little Gamers (Brussels, Belgium)
- Magic Crystals (Wyoming, MI, United States)
- Proximity HD (Warrenville, IL, United States)
- Ragu (Tyresö, Sweden)
- Rocketball (San Diego, CA, United States)
- Samurai Soul Hunters (latest) (Bothell, WA, United States)
- Shuggy (Ely, United Kingdom)
- Sprockets of Strife (College Station, TX, United States)
- Viduce (Lyon, France)

Blazing Birds, The Dishwasher: Dead Samurai, Yo Ho Kablammo!, HurricaneX, and Shuggy all eventually were published on Xbox LIVE Arcade. HurricaneX was eventually released as Kung Fu Strike and Shuggy as The Adventures of Shuggy.

=== 2008 Warm-Up Challenge ===
Also known as the Silicon Minds Warm-Up Challenge, it was a precursor to the main 2008 Dream Build Play Challenge, announced in late 2007 this one centered on artificial intelligence and promised an opportunity to interview for at an internship with Microsoft Research, Rare, or Lionhead Studios.

==== Winners ====
Top 5:

- Conquerator (Nicholas Barratt & Gillian Allen, Dollar Short Games)
- Hive (Nancy McCourt)
- iSheep (Markus Jost & Remo Zehnder)
- Orblast (John Montemorano, What About Gameplay?)
- Specimen (Brent Strandy)

=== 2008 Challenge ===
The 2008 Dream Build Play Challenge marks the first time the contest offered $75,000 worth of prizes. First place won $40,000, second place won $20,000, third place won $10,000, and fourth place won $5,000.

==== Winners ====
Top 4 Prize Winners:

- CarneyVale: Showtime, Singapore-MIT GAMBIT Game Lab
- Battle Tennis, Gasp!
- Weapon of Choice, Mommy's Best Games
- HurricaneX2, Qooc Soft

Top 20 (in alphabetic order):

- An Awesome Game (United States)
- Artoon (United Kingdom)
- AUTO (Denmark)
- Battle Tennis (Venezuela)
- Bennu (Portugal)
- Biology Battle (Thailand)
- Blow (Canada)
- Carney Vale:Showtime (Singapore)
- Galex-e-mail (United States)
- HurricaneX2 (China)
- Petank Party (France)
- Project X- Trino (United States)
- Pyramid Camel Boy (United Kingdom)
- Save Jack (South Africa)
- Smashell (Italy)
- Spacehack (South Africa)
- Streets of Fury (France)
- Tropos (South Korea)
- Weapon of Choice (United States)
- Zeit 2 (Germany)

HurricaneX2 and Zeit 2 were eventually released on Xbox LIVE Arcade.

Weapon of Choice made it into the Guinness World Records Gamer's Edition. HurricaneX2 was eventually released as Kung Fu Strike.

=== 2009 Challenge ===
==== Winners ====
Top 4:

- Dust: An Elysian Tail, Humble Hearts
- Max Blastronaut, Coin App
- Rotor'scope, Nolver Apps
- HurricaneX2 Evolution, YouYun Tech

Top 20 (alphabetic order):

- Avatar Golf, Barkers Crest Studio (United States)
- BAMBOONO, TAKENOKO (Japan)
- Band of Bears, Cellar Door Games (Canada)
- Cloudberry Kingdom, Zealous Studios (United States)
- Creed Arena, Reedake (Australia)
- Duality ZF, Xona Games (Canada)
- Dust: An Elysian Tail, Humble Hearts (United States)
- Echoes, binary zoo (Australia)
- Guru-Guru, Gasp! (Venezuela)
- HurricaneX2 Evolution, YouYun Tech (China)
- Kaleidoscope, Morsel (Canada)
- Magnetic Mind, laXarIS (Germany)
- Masters of Belial, Brain Seal (United Kingdom)
- Max Blastronaut, Coin App (United States)
- Mirror, Silver Dollar Games (Canada)
- Powa Volley, Kydos Studio (France)
- Rotorscope, Nolver Apps (Spain)
- Sol Survivor, Cadenza Interactive (United States)
- Square Off, Team Chaos (Australia)
- What The?!, Social Loner Studios (United States)

Cloudberry Kingdom, Dust: An Elysian Tail and HurricaneX2 Evolution were eventually released on Xbox LIVE Arcade. Score Rush Extended, a spiritual prequel to Duality ZF, was eventually released on PS4.

HurricaneX2 Evolution was eventually released as Kung Fu Strike.

=== 2010 Challenge ===
This year, in addition to the $75,000 in prizes for the top 4 entries, there was an additional $60,000 Old Spice prize. This allowed a single team to potentially win $100,000 in prizes.

==== Standard Dream-Build-Play Challenge ====
The standard prize money split, labelled a bit differently: $40,000 grand prize, $20,000 first prize, $10,000 second prize, and $5,000 third prize.

==== Microsoft Old Spice Challenge ====
In 2010, Old Spice launched four scents inspired by Matterhorn, Fiji, Denali, and Cyprus. The contest asked indie game studios to use these same places as inspiration for a funny and entertaining Xbox 360 game, the winner to be used to produce the products.

==== Winners ====
Top 6

- Lumi, Nicolas D. (France)
- ARES, Extend Studio (Thailand)
- Prismatic Solid, YO1KOMORI (Japan)
- Beat Hazard, Cold Beam Games (United Kingdom)
- Duality ZF, Xona Games (Canada – excluding Quebec)
- JoyJoy, Radiangames (United States)

Top 20 (alphabetical order)

- ARES, Extend Studio (Thailand)
- Abaddon, Team Cornflake (United States)
- Abducted!, Photonic Games (United States)
- Alien Jelly, Collective Mass (Australia)
- Armor Valley, Protege Production (Singapore)
- Beat Hazard, Cold Beam Games (United Kingdom)
- Capsized, Alientrap (Canada, excluding Quebec)
- Creed Arena, Reedake (Australia)
- Duality ZF, Xona Games (Canada – excluding Quebec)
- Dysnomia, Team Mango (United Kingdom)
- JoyJoy, Radiangames (United States)
- King Spray, electronicshed (Australia)
- Lumi, Nicolas D. (France)
- Mind Over Metal, Murudai (Australia)
- Ninja Garden, Kablammo Games (Ireland)
- Prismatic Solid, YO1KOMORI (Japan)
- Shape Shooter, Super Jai (United States)
- Shoot 1UP, Mommy's Best Games (United States)
- Soul, Kydos Studio (France)
- The Shadows in the Underworld, Polaris (Canada, excluding Quebec)

ARES and Capsized eventually were published on Xbox LIVE Arcade. Prismatic Solid was eventually published to PS4. Score Rush Extended, a spiritual prequel to Duality ZF, was eventually released on PS4.

=== 2011 Challenge ===
==== Winners ====
Top 4:

- Blocks That Matter
- Solar 2
- TIC: Part 1
- Sequence

Honorable Mentions:

- Production Quality: Alien Jelly
- Innovation: The Bridge
- Fun Factor: Ninja Crash

The Bridge was published to Xbox LIVE Arcade.

=== 2012 Challenge ===
==== Xbox 360 Winners ====
Top 4:

- One Finger Death Punch, Silver Dollar Games
- Dead Pixels, CantStrafeRight
- Ninja Crash, Team Devil
- Gateways, Smudged Cat Games

==== Windows Phone Winners ====
Top 4:

- Smirkers, Kenneth Bugeja
- Pixel Blocked!, Daniel Truong
- Alter Ego, Denis Grachev
- Cradle to the Grave, COLTRAN Studios

=== 2017 Challenge ===
==== PC/Windows 10 Category ====
Finalists:

- The Forbidden Arts
- Goscurry
- Imperatum - WINNER - US$50,000

==== Cloud/Azure Category ====
Finalists:

- Stellar Conquest - Winner - US$100,000
- Clash of Camelot
- The Hadron Effect

==== Console/Xbox One Category ====
Finalists:

- Fighties - WINNER - US$25,000
- King's Guard TD
- Train Bandit

==== Windows Mixed Reality/HoloLens Category ====
Finalists:

- Racket: Nx
- Windlands
- Prison Boss VR - WINNER - US$50,000
