= Charlie Murder =

2013 video game

- Developer: Ska Studios
- Publishers: Microsoft Game Studios (Xbox); Ska Studios (Windows)
- Engine: Microsoft XNA
- Platforms: Xbox 360, Windows, Linux, macOS
- Release: Xbox 360; August 14, 2013; Windows, Linux, macOS; May 12, 2017
- Genre: Beat 'em up
- Modes: Single-player, multiplayer

Charlie Murder is a beat 'em up video game developed by Ska Studios and published by Microsoft Game Studios for the Xbox 360 and Ska Studios for Microsoft Windows. First revealed in January 2010 for Xbox Live Indie Games, the studio announced in May 2010 that the game would undergo a "complete overhaul" and be published in 2012 through Xbox Live Arcade for the Xbox 360. Charlie Murder was eventually released on 14 August 2013 to positive reviews, with critics praising the game's soundtrack and hand-illustrated visuals. Versions for Microsoft Windows, Linux, and macOS were released on May 12, 2017, via Steam.

The game features five playable characters—all members of the garage punk band Charlie Murder—who fight a demonic army raised by a former band member in an attempt to save the world from the apocalypse. Charlie Murder has both single-player and four-player online and offline cooperative gameplay modes. The game was created using Microsoft XNA tools.

== Gameplay ==
Similar to Castle Crashers, Charlie Murder is a side-scrolling beat 'em up game with role-playing game elements. Players select one of five band members to play as; the lead vocalist and band namesake Charlie Murder, guitarist Lester Deth, bassist Tommy Homicide, backup vocalist Kelly "Skelekitten" Skitten, or drummer The Rexecutioner. Players can complete the game alone, or can team together with up to three other people, through either offline (with all of the players using the same Xbox 360) or online cooperative gameplay (co-op). With each additional player, the number of enemies that appear on screen at once increases. Players can also fight each other in special areas of the game. The game takes place across several different areas, including a construction site, a graveyard, a pirate ship, and a mall. Players are pitted against a large variety of enemies, including zombies, witches, ninjas, giant rats, yetis, and sharks with dynamite strapped to their heads. Interspersed between the normal combat levels are a number of minigames and special levels, including driving and flying levels.

Players fight using two buttons to string together combinations of light and heavy melee attacks. Players can also use grabs, launch enemies into the air, use character-specific special attacks, and pick up and use weapons. In co-op mode, players can also team up to execute highly damaging group attacks. Scattered throughout the game are bosses, unique and challenging enemies that have more health and are more difficult to fight than normal enemies. There are also "minibosses", enemies that are less challenging than bosses but more challenging than regular enemies. Minibosses have the ability to block and counter players' attacks, which few other enemies in the game do.

Each of the five band members has a unique character class, which vary from one another mainly by the special magical attacks, called Anar-chi, that they can use. Anar-chi attacks include Tommy Homicide's ability to summon acid-coated buzzsaws and The Rexecutioner's ability to summon and use a debris-spitting drum kit. Players are able to use new abilities by visiting an in-game tattoo parlor. Tattoos, and the special abilities that they unlock, are character-specific. Players can also unlock new abilities, including additional combination attacks, group attacks, and the ability to use two weapons at once, by leveling up.

Players use an in-game Windows 8 phone to manage their inventory, level up, read emails that explain game mechanics, and scan QR codes that unlock items and give the character money or followers (the game's experience point equivalent). Players earn money by defeating enemies, and outside of combat, they can purchase weapons and armor (all of which is visible on the character), stat-boosting food and alcohol, and the aforementioned tattoos from shops.

== Plot ==
Gameplay screenshots

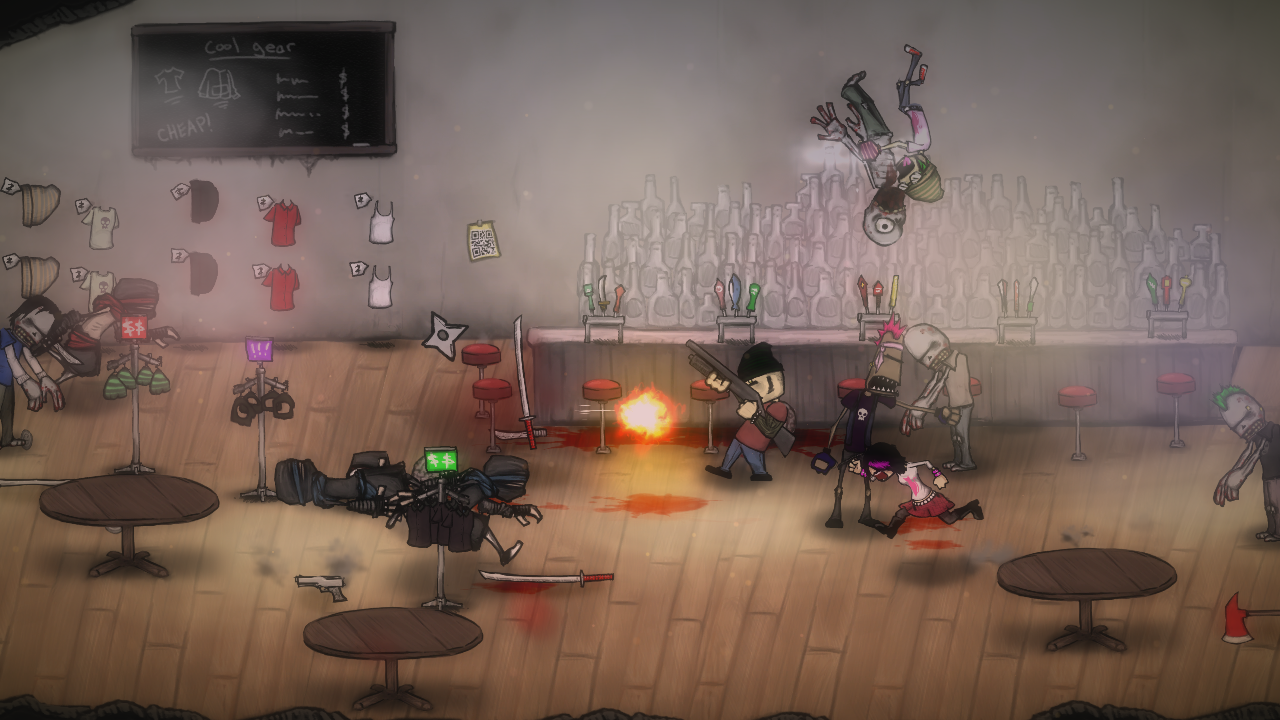
Charlie, Kelly, Lester, and Tommy fighting zombies and ninjas in a bar

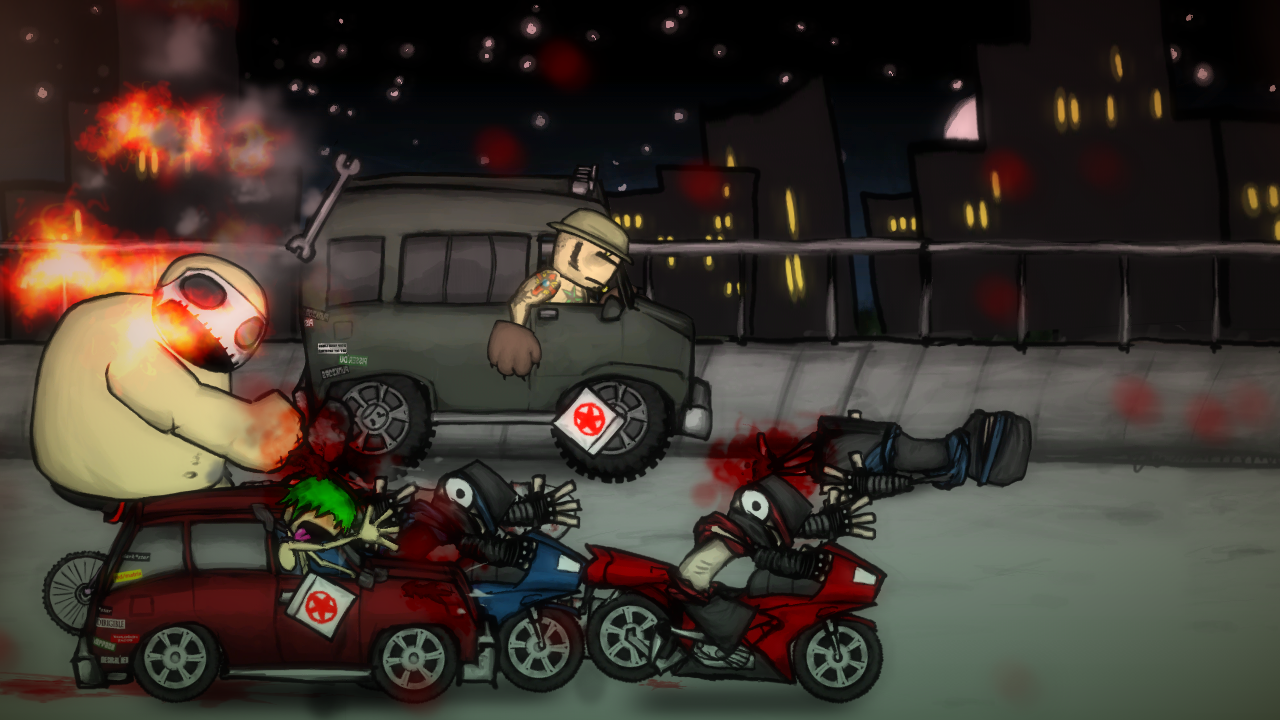
Charlie, Tommy, and Rex fighting ninjas in a vehicle sequence

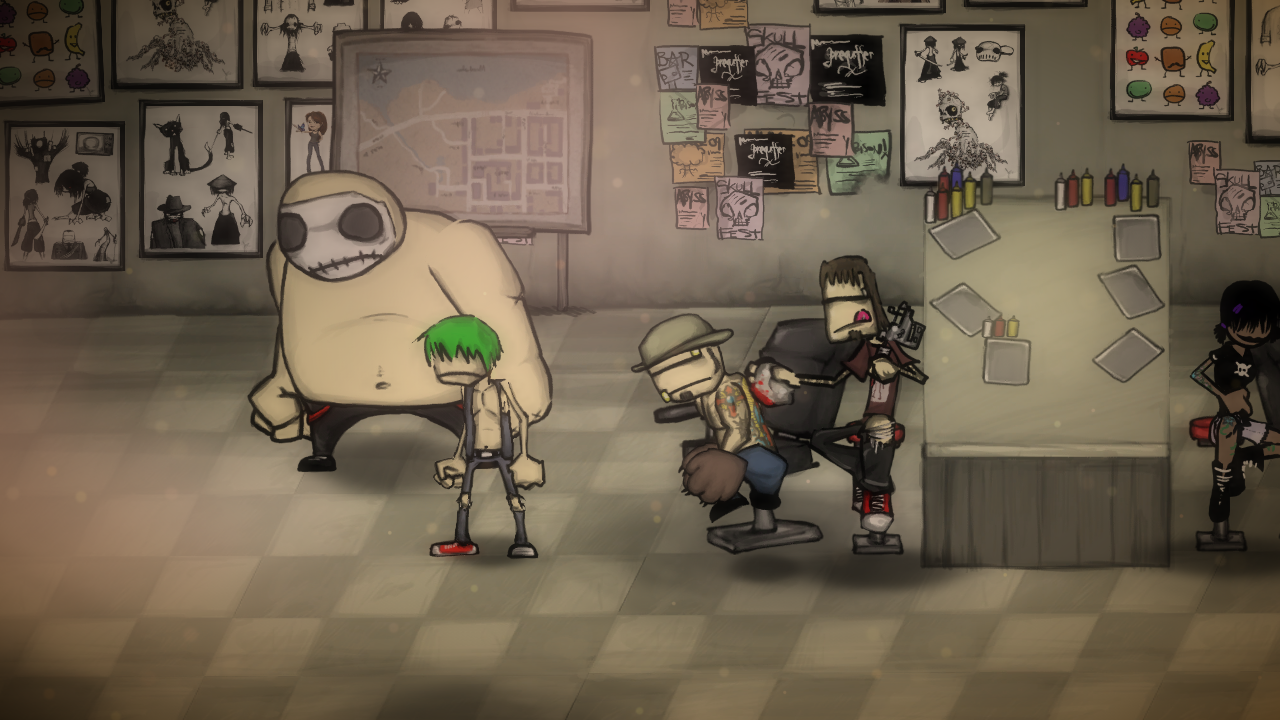
Tommy Homicide getting a tattoo at the in-game tattoo parlor

The game's protagonist, Charlie Murder, is a member of a garage punk band of the same name. Charlie kicks one of the founding members, Paul, out of the band, and begins to experience chart-topping success creating music in a new genre with new bandmates. Under the name Lord Mortimer, Paul forms his own band, Gore Quaffer, and makes a pact with a demon, raising an army of demons and undead in order to destroy Charlie Murder. Charlie and his band are killed at the beginning of the game, fight out of hell, and are reborn on Earth amidst an apocalypse caused by Lord Mortimer and his army. In order to stop the apocalypse, Charlie Murder must defeat Gore Quaffer in a Battle of the Bands.

During the game, a series of flashbacks detail the game's backstory. As Charlie and his new bandmates experience success without Paul, the latter becomes increasingly upset, eventually vowing revenge. The flashbacks neither paint Charlie Murder in a wholly positive light, nor Paul in a wholly negative light. Charlie Murder has an in-game talk radio station, which plays in enemy-free areas. Additional information about the band and about the game's world is presented in the form of people calling into the radio program.

The game has two endings that depend on whether or not the player has acquired all of the hidden pieces of Smockula by the time of the final battle. If the player has not gathered the pieces, then the game immediately ends upon Lord Mortimer's defeat, and a credits montage reveals that, back when Mortimer was Paul, he was childhood friends with Charlie. This is considered the "Bad Ending".

If the player collects all the pieces of Smockula and has them equipped during the final battle, then Lord Mortimer is incapacitated instead of killed, and Charlie Murder confronts the demon who granted Mortimer his power, a being known as the Angel of Chaos. After the Angel's death, Mortimer turns back into Paul and he and Charlie reconcile. The credits montage shows how each of the surviving band members now live comfortable, happy lives. This is considered the "Good Ending".

== Development ==
Charlie Murder was first announced in January 2010 in a Ska Studios blog post as an Xbox Live Indie Games title set for release in March 2010. The game's plot was a four-member band's journey to save Skelekitten (Murder's girlfriend) from a rival metal band. A demo of the game was showcased at PAX East 2010. In April, Ska Studios founder James Silva announced that the game was in development for an unidentified platform and would no longer be released through Xbox Live Indie Games. Joystiq noted that the demo ran on Microsoft XNA Game Studio 4.0, which is designed for the Xbox 360, Microsoft Windows computers, and Windows Phone 7. Ska Studios announced in May that the game was to undergo a "complete overhaul", and would be released through Xbox Live Arcade in 2012. The game was eventually released in August 2013 as part of Summer of Arcade, an annual Xbox Live Arcade promotion known for releasing several of the platform's most acclaimed games.

Ska Studios' first games, including the Xbox Live Arcade game The Dishwasher: Dead Samurai (April 2009), were developed entirely by James Silva. Michelle Juett was a tester for The Dishwasher: Dead Samurai, and the two met in person for the first time at the September 2009 Penny Arcade Expo. They began to date a year later, and Juett eventually left ArenaNet to join Ska Studios, becoming its second employee. Charlie Murder was one of the first games that the two worked on together. Silva did all of the game's programming work, while Juett handled its marketing. Silva and Juett worked together to design the art and compose the soundtrack. Charlie Murder's music was produced by Silva and sung by the pair. In an interview with Joystiq, James Silva explained that he used major game conferences, such as PAX East, as public betas. The conferences allowed Silva to expose a large number of people to the game, providing him with the opportunity to solicit feedback and discover issues. The couple also invited friends over for parties in order to test the game while it was in development. Silva proposed to Juett at the Charlie Murder booth at PAX 2011, using an in-game cutscene built in as a secret for the occasion.

Charlie Murder was the third Ska Studios game published by Microsoft Studios. During development, Microsoft Studios provided Ska Studios with usability testing and play testing feedback, handled localization, and found and suggested bug fixes. Microsoft required Ska Studios to create picture packs (Xbox Live account customizations), but was not responsible for the Windows Phone 8 game mechanic. Ska Studios had complete creative control over the game itself. Charlie Murder was promoted as a free Xbox download with Microsoft's Games with Gold program during the month of June 2014.

== Reception ==
Reception

Aggregate score
| Aggregator | Score |
|---|---|
| Metacritic | X360: 78/100 |

Review scores
| Publication | Score |
|---|---|
| Destructoid | 7.5/10 |
| Game Informer | 7.5/10 |
| IGN | 7/10 |
| Official Xbox Magazine (US) | 9/10 |

Charlie Murder received "generally favorable" reviews, according to video game review aggregator Metacritic. The game's music was highly praised. The game's hand-illustrated visuals were also praised by reviewers. Critics felt that the music and visual style complemented the game's punk rock theme, and Official Xbox Magazine's Cameron Lewis praised the game for being rich in personality and detail without being over-polished.

Reviewers were less enthused about the game's user interface, and found that many gameplay details went unexplained. IGN's Jose Otero found the inventory management system, which lacks an easy way to sort items, to be problematic. Chris Carter from Destructoid noted that the game's intricacies are described in messages on the in-game phone, which he considered difficult to navigate and read, and that the messages were often insufficiently clear and detailed.

Critics compared the game to Ska Studios' previous side-scrolling beat 'em up games, The Dishwasher: Dead Samurai and The Dishwasher: Vampire Smile. Game Informer noted Charlie Murder's similarity to the Dishwasher series, and Destructoid's Chris Carter believed that Charlie Murder was an improvement over the previous games, in both presentation and in the amount of personality that the characters had. There was a consensus among reviewers that the game was more enjoyable in multiplayer, with Hardcore Gamer saying that the game felt designed for cooperative play.
