= Dishwasher (disambiguation) =

Dishwasher most commonly refers to a home appliance which automatically washes dishes.

(The) Dishwasher may also refer to:

- Dishwasher (occupation), a person who washes dishes as an occupation
- Scullery maid, a traditional occupation in which a woman washed dishes in a scullery before the invention of automatic dishwashers
- The Dishwasher: Dead Samurai, a 2009 beat 'em up video game
- The Dishwasher: Vampire Smile, its 2011 sequel
- The Dishwasher, a 2016 novel by Stéphane Larue
- The Dishwasher (film), a 2023 film adaptation by Francis Leclerc of the Larue novel
- Dishwasher Pete or Pete Jordan, author of the Dishwasher zine and book

== See also ==
- Dishwashing
