= A.R.E.S.: Extinction Agenda =

2010 video game

A.R.E.S. Extinction Agenda
- Developer: Extend Studio
- Publishers: Origo Games; Aksys Games
- Engine: XNA
- Platforms: Windows; Xbox 360; Cloud (OnLive)
- Release: Windows; December 14, 2010; January 19, 2011 (Steam); Extinction Agenda EX; XBLA; October 2, 2013; Windows; October 3, 2014
- Genres: Platform, shooter
- Mode: Single-player

A.R.E.S. Extinction Agenda is a side-scrolling platform shooter for Windows. It was developed by Thai independent developer Extend Studio. An updated version called Extinction Agenda EX was released for Xbox Live Arcade on October 2, 2013, and for Windows via Steam on October 3, 2014.

== Plot ==
The game takes place in a future setting where the Earth is contaminated by pollution. A group of scientists were trapped in the Deep Space Reprocessing station after a mysterious asteroid emitting an unknown fluorescent gas collided into the station. The survivors then discovered that machines in the station became violent towards them after being exposed to the gas. Eventually, they managed to send the sample of the gas to the research team back at the United Earth Headquarters to find out a way to rescue them and called the gas Zytron. Player takes control of the game protagonist Ares, the first Zytron immune robot created to battle machines that became malevolent from being exposed to the Zytron gas, in a mission to rescue the survivors from a deep space station.

== Gameplay ==
Players control Ares' movement with WASD keys on the keyboard and aim with a mouse. Ares can double jump and roll to avoid attacks and obstacles and can change his suit during the course of the game which gives him a different aesthetic appearance and abilities. He can also activate Vakyl Cannon, a rechargeable orbital cannon which destroys all of the enemies on screen. Players can collect parts from destroyed enemies to craft items and upgrade weapons. They can also collect Datacubes which are scattered throughout the stages which not only unlock background information about certain characters and enemies, but also improve Ares' abilities such as lowering the number of parts required to craft items. Throughout the game players are able to obtain new weapons in each stage. At the end of each stage, Ares will have to defeat bosses in order to progress. Players can go back between stages during the game by accessing the in-game menu.

== Development ==
A.R.E.S. Extinction Agenda was originally called Trashman, but the development team changed the name to appeal more to international audiences.

== Reception ==
=== Extinction Agenda ===
A.R.E.S. Extinction Agenda

Aggregate score
Aggregator	Score
Metacritic	68/100

Review scores
Publication	Score
Eurogamer	6/10
IGN	7.5/10
PC Gamer (UK)	79%
PC PowerPlay	5/10

Extinction Agenda received "average" reviews according to the review aggregation website Metacritic. Critics from major publications praised the game for its soundtrack and detailed vibrant artwork while criticizing the length of the game to be too short.

Due to its popularity, the soundtrack of the game was eventually released on Steam as a downloadable content on January 2, 2012. A.R.E.S. won second prize in 2010 Microsoft's Dream.Build.Play. contest along with other notable independent games such as Beat Hazard.

=== Extinction Agenda EX ===
A.R.E.S. Extinction Agenda EX

Aggregate score
Aggregator	Score
Metacritic	(PC) 70/100 (X360) 66/100

Review scores
Publication	Score
GameSpot	(X360) 6/10
Hardcore Gamer	(X360) 4/5
HobbyConsolas	(X360) 71%
Official Xbox Magazine (UK)	(X360) 7/10
Official Xbox Magazine (US)	(X360) 4/10
411Mania	(X360) 7.5/10

Extinction Agenda EX received "average" reviews on both platforms according to Metacritic.
