= Indie Games Uprising =

- Genre: Video game development
- Inaugurated: December 2010
- Website: Event website

The Indie Games Uprising is a developer led event designed to promote the "best of the best" Xbox Live Indie Games. The promotion was originally conceived by Robert Boyd of Zeboyd Games and Ian Stocker of MagicalTimeBean, when they noticed that they both had games coming out in the same time frame.

== Promotions ==
=== Indie Games Winter Uprising ===
The first Indie Games Uprising launched in December 2010. The promotion was curated by developers Robert Boyd and Ian Stocker. Notable releases include Cthulhu Saves the World, Soulcaster II, Decimation X3 by Xona Games, and ZP2KX: Zombies & Pterodactyls! by Ska Studios. Boyd reported "spotty results" from the promotion, and cited developer's inability to set release dates on their games as a major issue. Shortly after the promotion, Microsoft allowed developers to select release dates for their games.

=== Indie Games Summer Uprising ===
Journalist Dave Voyles and Indie Games Winter Uprising developer Kris Steele of Fun Infused Games coordinated the second Indie Games Uprising. The Indie Games Summer Uprising opened up game submissions to the public, and were then narrowed down through rounds of voting. The Summer Uprising launched on August 22, 2011, and released one title daily from Monday through Friday. While developers reported a varying range of sales, Cute Things Dying Violently sold over 10,000 copies in its first month of release.

=== Indie Games Uprising III ===
The Indie Games Uprising III, scheduled to start on September 10, 2012, was curated by developer Michael Hicks and Summer Uprising coordinator Dave Voyles. Hicks expressed his interest in another promotion after he noticed a number of "exciting" games would be released around the same time as his own title Sententia. Notable games include Gateways by the creator of The Adventures of Shuggy, and qrth-phyl from hermitgames, developer of the critically acclaimed Leave Home.

=== Indie Games Uprising Tribute ===
Launched on September 28, 2015, the Uprising aimed to highlight developers who started their careers on Xbox Live Indie Games or gained something from publishing on the channel. Multiple games from previous Uprisings are featured, along with former XBLIG developers that are working on new projects for Xbox One, PlayStation 4 and Wii U.

== List of games ==
Promotion	Game	Developer
Winter Uprising	Soulcaster 2	MagicalTimeBean
Winter Uprising	Cthulhu Saves the World	Zeboyd Games
Winter Uprising	Radiangames Crossfire 2	Radiangames
Winter Uprising	Chu's Dynasty	Tribetoy
Winter Uprising	Alpha Squad	Dragon Divide
Winter Uprising	Epic Dungeon	eyehook
Winter Uprising	Break Limit	Xalterax
Winter Uprising	Decimation X3	Xona Games
Winter Uprising	Asteroids Do Concern Me	Evil Robot Logic
Winter Uprising	Hypership Out of Control	Fun Infused Games
Winter Uprising	Aphelion Episode Two: Wings of Omega	lunatic studios
Winter Uprising	ZP2KX: Zombies & Pterodactyls!	Ska Studios
Winter Uprising	Ubergridder	Zendarion
Winter Uprising	Rickenbacker vs. the Aliens	Smokinskull
Summer Uprising	Raventhorne	Milkstone Studios
Summer Uprising	Battle High: San Bruno	Mattrified
Summer Uprising	Cute Things Dying Violently	ApathyWorks
Summer Uprising	SpeedRunner HD	DoubleDutch Games
Summer Uprising	Take Arms	Discord Games
Summer Uprising	T.E.C. 3001	Phoenix Game Studio
Summer Uprising	Train Frontier Express	Team Train Frontier
Summer Uprising	Doom and Destiny	Heartbit Interactive
Summer Uprising	Chester	Brilliant Blue-G
Summer Uprising	Redd: The Lost Temple	Blazing Forge Games
Uprising III	qrth-phyl	hermitgames
Uprising III	Sententia	MichaelArts
Uprising III	Diehard Dungeon	tricktale
Uprising III	Gateways	Smudged Cat Games
Uprising III	Smooth Operators	Andreas Heydeck
Uprising III	Entropy	Autotivity
Uprising III	City Tuesday	Chris Zukowski
Uprising III	Xenominer	Gristmill Studios
Uprising III	Pixel	Ratchet Game Studios

== Support ==
Though not officially involved, Microsoft has supported the Indie Games Uprisings with front page dashboard promotions on Xbox Live.
