= Dust: An Elysian Tail =

2012 video game

- Developer: Humble Hearts (Note: Additional support by Microsoft Game Studios Japan's Xbox Live Arcade team.)
- Publisher: Microsoft Studios (Note: Humble Hearts published the Windows, OS X, Linux, PlayStation 4 and iOS ports. Limited Run Games published the Nintendo Switch port.)
- Director: Dean Dodrill
- Producers: Andrew Williams; Kevin Hathaway
- Designer: Dean Dodrill
- Programmer: Dean Dodrill
- Writers: Dean Dodrill; Alex Kain
- Composers: Hyperduck Soundworks; Alexander Brandon
- Engine: XNA
- Platforms: Xbox 360; Windows; Linux; OS X; PlayStation 4; iOS; Nintendo Switch
- Release: WW: August 15, 2012; Windows; WW: May 24, 2013; Linux, OS X; WW: December 17, 2013; PlayStation 4; NA: October 7, 2014; EU: October 8, 2014; iOS; WW: October 8, 2015; Nintendo Switch; WW: September 10, 2018
- Genres: Action role-playing, hack and slash, Metroidvania
- Mode: Single-player

Dust: An Elysian Tail is a 2012 action role-playing game developed by American independent designer Dean Dodrill studio Humble Hearts with support by Microsoft Game Studios Japan and published by Microsoft Studios. It was released for Xbox 360 through Xbox Live Arcade on August 15, 2012. It was subsequently ported by Humble Hearts for Windows on May 24, 2013, for Linux and OS X on December 17, 2013, and for PlayStation 4 in October 2014. A version for the Nintendo Switch was announced at E3 2018 and was released by Limited Run Games on September 10, 2018.

Dust takes place in a world populated by anthropomorphic animals, where the main character, Dust, comes upon a sentient sword, the Blade of Ahrah, and its guardian Fidget. Without memories of his past, Dust follows Fidget's advice and aids the population of the world against forces led by General Gaius. The game is an action-adventure game with Metroidvania-style exploration, requiring the player to gain power-ups to allow Dust to reach new areas. Combat is based on brawler-like mechanics, where Dust can use a combination of swordplay and magic from Fidget to defeat enemies. Dodrill compiled nearly all of the game's programming and assets himself, relying only on external help for voice acting, narrative, and the game's soundtrack.

Dust received generally positive reviews praising the game particularly for its art style. The game has sold more than a million copies as of March 2014.

== Gameplay ==
Dust takes place in the fictional world of Falana, inhabited by anthropomorphic animals. Gameplay is presented on a 2D side-scrolling plane. The player controls the titular main character, Dust (Lucien Dodge), as he tries to remember his past. Dust wields a sentient sword, the Blade of Ahrah (Edward Bosco), as his main weapon. Fidget (Kimlinh Tran), the sword's guardian, acts as a companion for Dust and can use magical attacks (such as spitting on monsters) As the player travels the world, they can acquire power-ups that alter gameplay, such as the ability to double jump or climb to previously unreachable areas or flying like a tornado. Incorporating elements of role-playing video games, Dust can gain experience points by defeating enemies, and in turn may level up. These can be used to raise various attributes, such as health, strength, defense or magic. Non-player characters can be interacted with throughout the game's world to sell items or receive quests. Dodrill, who is half Korean, incorporated various Korean elements in the game design, including the logo and various food items.

== Plot ==
The game begins with Dust (Dodge) awakening in a forest meadow, approached by a floating, sentient sword known as the Blade of Ahrah (Bosco). Dust is joined by Fidget (Tran), a small flying creature called a Nimbat, who is the sword's guardian, and sets out for a small town in search of answers.

Upon arriving in Aurora, the group find the town overrun with monsters. The mayor of the town asks Dust for his help, and he tracks down the leader of the enemies, Fuse (voiced by Edwyn Tiong). Just before he dies, Fuse reveals himself to be a Moonblood, creatures who are victims of a genocide perpetrated by General Gaius (voiced by River Kanoff). Fuse also tells Dust that he played a role in the war at some point. Mayor Bram instructs Dust to speak to a woman in Aurora named Ginger (voiced by Amber Lee Connors), who may have more knowledge of the Moonbloods. She is revealed to be part of a group of Moonblood sympathizers, a group that was recently found and killed by General Gaius's soldiers.

After travelling into the northern mountains, Dust and Fidget come across an abandoned village, where Ginger and the leader of the Moonbloods, Elder Gray Eyes (voiced by Mick Lauer), are waiting. Gray Eyes reveals that Dust was created by the Moonbloods from the souls of two people who perished at the same time: Jin (Ginger's brother) and Cassius (an assassin employed by Gaius and his closest friend). These two were exact opposites; Cassius was evil but of great skill with the sword, and Jin was innocent and good but incapable of defeating Gaius. Their combination together became the Moonblood's "Sen-Mithrarin" who wields Cassius' skill of the blade and Jin's heart.

The group heads to the Moonblood base in a volcanic region to the north named Everdawn Basin, where Dust assists the Moonbloods in fighting back Gaius's troops. Reaching the peak of the volcano, Dust fights General Gaius in a lengthy battle. Eventually, Gaius hangs from an outcrop over a pool of lava, where he tells Dust that Cassius is no longer part of him, then throws himself into the lava. Fidget tries to get the exhausted Dust back up, but he refuses, and is consumed by the volcano.

After the battle, Elder Gray Eyes gives a speech to the remaining Moonbloods, telling them that because of Dust's sacrifice, they can now rebuild and live at peace with the rest of the world. During his dialogue, Ginger and Fidget witness a dust cloud, along with the Blade of Ahrah rising out of the volcano and flying off, suggesting Dust may still be alive, and Fidget chases after it in hopes of finding him.

== Development ==
Aside from voice acting, soundtrack, and parts of the story, Dust was designed and programmed entirely by Dodrill. A self-taught illustrator and animator, he had previously done artwork and cinematics on Epic Games' Jazz Jackrabbit 2, and was in the process of creating an independent animated game, Elysian Tail. He assumed it would take three months to complete the game; it actually took over three-and-a-half years. He originally envisioned the game as an 8-bit-style platformer, similar to earlier entries in the Castlevania series. Inspirations for the final game came from such titles as Metroid, Golden Axe, and Ys I & II, which Dodrill cites as his favorite games.

The game was originally targeted for the Xbox 360 Indie Games channel, but upon winning the 2009 Microsoft Dream.Build.Play Challenge, it was awarded a contract for an Xbox Live Arcade release. Dust: An Elysian Tail was originally expected to be released in late 2011, but was later delayed until summer 2012. A version for the PlayStation 4, with 1080p support, was released on October 7, 2014.

== Release ==
In May 2016, Humble Hearts joined forces with the subscription box company, IndieBox, to distribute an exclusive physical release of Dust: An Elysian Tail. This limited collector's edition included a themed USB drive with DRM-free game file, official soundtrack on CD, instruction manual, Steam key, and various custom-designed collectible items including an individually-numbered animation cell.

A Nintendo Switch version of the game was released on September 10, 2018. Limited Run Games announced at E3 2018 that it would release a physical version of Dust: An Elysian Tail for the Nintendo Switch later that year.

The official soundtrack was released on October 1, 2012. It was composed by HyperDuck SoundWorks (Chris T Geehan & Dan Byrne-McCullough) and Alexander Brandon, and contains 37 tracks at a total length of 1.79 hours.

== Reception ==
Reception

Aggregate score
Aggregator	Score
Metacritic	X360: 83/100; PC: 85/100; PS4: 79/100 iOS: 91/100; NS: 84/100

Review scores
Publication	Score
Destructoid	8.5/10
Eurogamer	7/10
Game Informer	8.75/10
GameSpot	7/10
Giant Bomb	5/5
IGN	8.5/10
Official Xbox Magazine (US)	9.5/10
Polygon	8/10
TouchArcade	5/5

Dust: An Elysian Tail received generally positive reviews from critics. Review aggregator website Metacritic provides a score of 83 out of 100 from 59 critics for the Xbox 360 version, 85 out of 100 from 7 critics for the PC version, 91 out of 100 from 4 critics for the iPhone/ iPad version, 79 out of 100 from 5 critics for the PlayStation 4 version and 84 out of 100 from 6 critics for the Nintendo Switch version.

Official Xbox Magazine gave the game 9.5 out of 10, praising the detailed environments and animations and also approving of the combat system.

Vincent Ingenito of IGN gave the game a rating of 8.5 out of 10, saying "The RPG elements could have been stronger, and the boss battles are a bit of a letdown, but if those are the worst things about your game, you're in pretty good shape." He approved of the lively and varied backgrounds, gameplay and the amount of content in comparison to the price.

Tom McShea of GameSpot gave the game 7 out of 10, criticizing the combat, voice acting and story. However, some other aspects such as the diverse and vivid backgrounds, responsive controls and side content were complimented. In 2015, Hardcore Gamer included the game on their 200 Best Video Games of All Time.

During the 16th Annual D.I.C.E. Awards, the Academy of Interactive Arts & Sciences nominated Dust: An Elysian Tail for "Role-Playing/Massively Multiplayer Game of the Year".

=== Sales ===
Dust: An Elysian Tail sold over 45,000 copies during August 2012 based on leaderboard totals, and finished 2012 with nearly 83,000 sold. On February 18, 2014, Dust: An Elysian Tail was included as a part of Humble Indie Bundle 11. In March 2014, Humble Hearts reported that Dust: An Elysian Tail had sold more than a million copies across all platforms.

== Future ==
I will revisit the story of Dust sometime, it will be a while, because I want to do something unique, and different for a while. But I do have ideas for the next couple games. Like one we've done a lot of talking about and how we want to approach it.

— Dean Dodrill, PAX East 2013 interview

In October 2017, Dodrill announced that Humble Hearts' next game was Never Stop Sneakin', a light-hearted stealth game influenced by the Metal Gear series as part of his personal challenge in creating his sophomore game. Unlike Dust, Never Stop Sneakin' is played from a top-down perspective in a three-dimension world, and includes procedural generation with "engaging combat with the simplest controls possible", according to Dodrill. In the game, the mad genius Amadeus Guildenstern has gone back in time and kidnapped all of the past U.S. Presidents, and the player, as a secret agent, must infiltrate Guildenstern's base to rescue them.

== In other media ==
Fidget was featured as a usable skin in the Xbox 360 port of the survival-sandbox game Minecraft in the 2012 Summer of Arcade Skin Pack DLC, which was exclusive for a limited time between July and August 2012. Popular YouTuber Stampylonghead is best known for using this skin as his character in his Minecraft videos.

Dust is a playable character in the crossover fighting game Indie Pogo, which was released in July 2018 on Steam.
