= Snops Attack! Zombie Defense =

2012 video game

- Developer: SnopsGames
- Publisher: SnopsGames
- Designer: Mike Walz
- Composers: Mike Walz, Kyle Jones
- Platform: Xbox 360
- Release: September 11, 2012
- Genre: Vertical scrolling shooter
- Mode: Single-player

Snops Attack! Zombie Defense (aka Snops Attack! Zombie Defense Squadron) is a vertical scrolling shooter video game developed by SnopsGames for the Xbox 360’s Xbox Live Indie Games service and released on September 11, 2012.

== Plot ==
The game stars Snops, a decorated, heroic canine military veteran and pilot (who navigates an Alpha Wolf X1 fighter jet) who is on a mission to eradicate a zombie epidemic which has invaded the world and transformed everyone into zombies. Mike Walz (the game’s designer) dedicated Snops Attack! to the memory of his dog Snoopy/Snoppy, of which he based the game’s protagonist Snops after.

== Development ==
Snops battling an enemy UFO through a zombified forest

Snops Attack! was originally conceived when web designer Mike Walz was experimenting in SilverLight with the idea for web development on a SHMUP. When he decided that he truly wanted to make a SHMUP, he came across XNA Game Studio Express and signed on for the $100 Microsoft Creator’s Club membership. Development was done primarily by Walz over a span of ten months, with him handling the coding, visuals/sprites (all hand-drawn) and music. His main goal was making sure that the game ran at a consistent, silky-smooth 60fps (which Walz achieved), as he strongly opposed the idea of it running at 30fps. Walz states that his biggest challenge during development was drawing and animating each and every sprite for Snops Attack! by himself, and describes it as an extremely "time consuming" process. Walz cites old-school shoot 'em ups such as Twin Cobra, Thunder Force, Soldier Blade and Blazing Lazers as large influences on him growing up. He is in particular, a huge fan of the shmups from the Toaplan era.

== Reception ==
Snops Attack! Zombie Defense has been well received. The game ranked at number five on IndieGame.com's Top 10 Xbox Live Indie Games of 2012, noting that it stands among as one of the best (shmups) in its crowd. Retro Gamer gave the game a positive review saying: "It's a frantic, colourful offering that those with a penchant for bullets should check out." Snops Attack! has also developed a cult following in Japan, with it receiving coverage from Japanese video gaming magazine Gameside.
