= Super Amazing Wagon Adventure =

2012 video game

- Xbox 360 cover art
- Developer: sparsevector
- Publisher: sparsevector
- Engine: Microsoft XNA
- Platforms: Xbox 360, Windows
- Release: Xbox 360: WW: July 6, 2012; Windows: WW: October 17, 2013
- Genre: Action-adventure
- Mode: Single-player

Super Amazing Wagon Adventure (also Super Amazing Wagon Adventure Turbo) is a 2D action-adventure video game developed by sparsevector. It was released originally as an Xbox Live Indie Game, and was later released on PC.

== Design ==
The game adopts a retro theme, with graphics very similar to 8-bit games and has an optional CRT style display. It is a parody of The Oregon Trail, but with modern music.

The game follows a story line, but with random sequences that change scenes every 3–30 seconds with unpredictable attack and obstacle patterns.

The latest version is released on Windows platform and Xbox. The game can be beaten in 10 minutes, however due to randomness of the game it often takes longer to complete the game. It was developed using .NET Framework and XNA Engine.

== Gameplay ==
The player controls three migrants in the game. The objective is to shoot animals or enemies and survive obstacles within a given story. In the beginning the player selects characters and a wagon. The three characters can contract diseases that decrease their life points. The life points can be refilled by health packs or be traded for fur if the trader is encountered. Every animal killed in the game can be collected for trading purposes. However, touching the dead skunk causes a character to take one heart of damage.

The game features decision points which affects the gameplay depending on the player's choices. Points are not allowed to be saved. Every challenge in the game can unlock new survival mode games or a new wagon. It has intentional glitches that unlock the glitch wagon.

== Development ==
Super Amazing Wagon Adventure is the first game developed by sparsevector. It was started as a group project.

In 2015, when Microsoft shuttered the Xbox Live Indie Games store, Super Amazing Wagon Adventure received recognition as a stand out title.
