= The Adventures of Shuggy =

2011 video game

- Developer: Smudged Cat Games
- Publisher: Valcon Games
- Composer: Jesse Hopkins
- Engine: XNA
- Platforms: Xbox 360; Microsoft Windows; Linux; OS X
- Release: Xbox 360; June 15, 2011; Microsoft Windows; June 13, 2012; Linux, OS X October 30, 2015
- Genre: Puzzle-platform
- Mode: Single-player

The Adventures of Shuggy is a puzzle-platform game developed by British studio Smudged Cat Games and published by Valcon Games. It was released June 15, 2011 for the Xbox 360 via Xbox Live Arcade, for Microsoft Windows on June 13, 2012, and for Linux and OS X on October 30, 2015. It follows the vampire Shuggy as he seeks to rid his newly inherited mansion of its undesirable inhabitants.

The game received positive reviews from critics. Aggregate scores are in the high 70's range at both GameRankings and Metacritic, two aggregate websites. Critics praised Shuggy's varied gameplay mechanics and vast number of levels. They also gave high marks for the cartoon art style. Some reviewers were critical of the game's difficulty level and lack of checkpoints.

== Plot ==
The game begins with the vampire Shuggy inheriting a haunted Scottish mansion from his grandfather. In order to make it a livable space he must evict the undesirable creatures currently living in it. To do so he must collect all the gems in a given room to acquire a key. The keys are spread across five areas: The Dungeon, The Boiler Room, The Gallery, The Graveyard and The Clocktower. Once all keys are obtained Shuggy can evict the evil tenants and claim his mansion.

== Gameplay ==
In The Adventures of Shuggy the player character must clear a mansion of enemies by collecting gems and keys hidden within it.

The Adventures of Shuggy is a puzzle-platform game. The object of each level is to collect all of the gems in order to obtain a key. The game features over 100 levels of gameplay, and players can typically see an entire level on the screen. Two player cooperative play is also supported, with 36 levels of play. In addition to cooperative play competitive multiplayer is also included, with both local and online support.

The player character can only jump and move to the left or right, however several different gameplay mechanics are applied to the game depending on the level. For example, one level can be rotated 90 degrees in the direction the player is facing to alter the level's gravity and vertical orientation. A second mechanic involves the use of a rope to swing through a level. Players can wrap the rope around cogs to rotate them. Yet another gameplay mechanic used involves a timer in the upper-right hand corner of the screen. When the timer reaches zero time effectively rewinds backwards the amount of time originally on the clock. The player character is unaffected, however a second, ghost image of the character will follow the movements the player made until the clock expired. This process repeats until the player completes the level. Should the player touch another iteration of the player character they fail the level. Several other mechanics are used throughout the levels, such as objects that change Shuggy's size, and teleportation.

== Development ==
Smudged Cat Games started development on The Adventures of Shuggy shortly after Microsoft released the XNA framework, a set of tools that would allow individuals to program their own games for the Xbox 360. It was entered as a competitor in Microsoft's Dream.Build.Play competition, a program that awards winning games with a publishing contract on Xbox Live Arcade and development funding to complete the game. The game made the top 20 contestants, but ultimately was not awarded a publishing contract. Later that year the developer signed a contract with Sierra Online. When Sierra Online's parent company, Vivendi Games, was acquired by Activision Blizzard Sierra was shut down, terminating the contract with Smudged Cat Games. Shuggy was later picked up by Valcon Games. It passed Microsoft's Xbox Live certification process on May 1, 2011 and was released on June 15, 2011. Programmer David Johnston stated that in retrospect he wishes he had not spent four years in development. "On reflection, once I entered into Dream Build Play, I probably should have released it as soon as I could," Johnston stated. "It could have done with a bit of polish - but not three and half years’ worth." The game was also released for Microsoft Windows on June 13, 2012, and for Linux and OS X on October 30, 2015.

The Adventures of Shuggy was developed by programmer David Johnston who had previously developed Xbox Live Indie Games titles such as A Bomb’s Way, The Tower: A Bomb’s Climb and Timeslip. Johnston wrote the game code and designed all the game's levels. PomPom Games provided assistance with Xbox-specific elements such as Xbox Live support. He felt that his "artistic skills are on a par with a goldfish" and so worked with Chris Hildenbrand of Imbri Design for all the gameplay art assets. Bennet Aldous, an artist at Fat Cat Comics and friend of Johnston created the game's comic book cutscenes. Shuggy's music was composed by Jesse Hopkins.

== Reception ==
Reception

Aggregate scores
Aggregator	Score
GameRankings	78.22%
Metacritic	77/100

Review scores
Publication	Score
Edge	7/10
Eurogamer	8/10
Game Informer	8.25/10
GamePro	4.5/5
GameSpot	8/10
Official Xbox Magazine (US)	7.5/10

The Adventures of Shuggy was well received by critics. The game holds an aggregate score of 78.22% at GameRankings and 77/100 at Metacritic. Metacritic reports mostly positive reviews, with 18 of 23 reviews scoring the game a ratio of 75% or higher. Only two of the 23 reviews gave the game a score below a 70% ratio. Shuggy sold approximately 2,600 units within the first two weeks of its release. Year-end 2011 totals were over 5,500 units.

Critics generally gave high praise for Shuggy's varied gameplay mechanics. Nathan Meunier of GameSpot stated that "each stage offers a different flavor from the one before it" and added that the varied level experiences "[keep] the puzzle action buoyant well into the adventure." Terry Terrones of GamePro agreed; he felt that the game was "clever [...] with a subtle scaffolding complexity". Reviewers also praised the amount of gameplay, particularly the game's 100 levels. Eurogamer's Kristan Reed felt while the 100 levels were a welcome feature, the inclusion of cooperative and competitive levels expanded the game's value. The game's comic book-like presentation was also well received by critics. GameSpot's Nathan Meunier categorized the art as "cutesy" and Kristan Reed of Eurogamer called the art design "adorable".

Some reviewers criticized the game's difficulty level and lack of checkpoints during later stages. Game Informer's warned players to "prepare to die a lot". Official Xbox Magazine's Cameron Lewis also noted that players need much patience to play through the game. The critic from Edge magazine acknowledged that though the game is difficult and at times frustrating that it is "still worth sticking with".
