= Ska Studios =

Independent video game studio

Ska Studios LLC
- Logo
- Company type: Limited liability company
- Industry: Video games
- Founded: 2007
- Headquarters: Seattle, Washington, US
- Key people: James Silva
- Number of employees: 2
- Subsidiaries: Devoured Studios
- Website: ska-studios.com

Ska Studios is an independent game development studio founded by James Silva in 2007 after winning a contract to publish The Dishwasher: Dead Samurai to Xbox Live Arcade. Ska Studios has released four Metacritic-aggregated console games since then, more than any similarly sized studio. Ska Studios currently consists of Silva.

The studio is well known in indie gaming for its art style, which is described as cartoonish, grim, and gory, and its games' tight controls. Many of the studio's games are strongly inspired by modern action titles, such as Devil May Cry, Ninja Gaiden Black, and Dark Souls.

== History ==
Silva began making games as a hobby in 2001, starting with Zombie Smashers X, a River City Ransom style beat-em'-up game, but the title was financially unsuccessful, selling fewer than 100 units. James went on to develop more similarly unsuccessful titles, including Blood Zero, Zombie Smashers X2, and Survival Crisis Z, but didn't achieve viable commercial success until 8 years later, with 2009's The Dishwasher: Dead Samurai.

== Development ==
All of Ska Studios' currently released games are built using the XNA framework or its open-source cross platform counterpart, MonoGame. When Xbox One launched with no XNA support, Ska Studios made the switch to PlayStation 4, with Salt and Sanctuary being the studio's first title to launch on a non-Microsoft console. Regarding the change, James said:

"The engineering side of it was an issue. All of our code is .NET/XNA, and, even though XNA support has ended, .NET games can use open source wrappers like MonoGame and FNA to carry the torch. But Xbox One has no .NET support. PS4 does, with titles like Towerfall: Ascension and Transistor using MonoGame in one form or another to deploy to PS4."

== Games ==
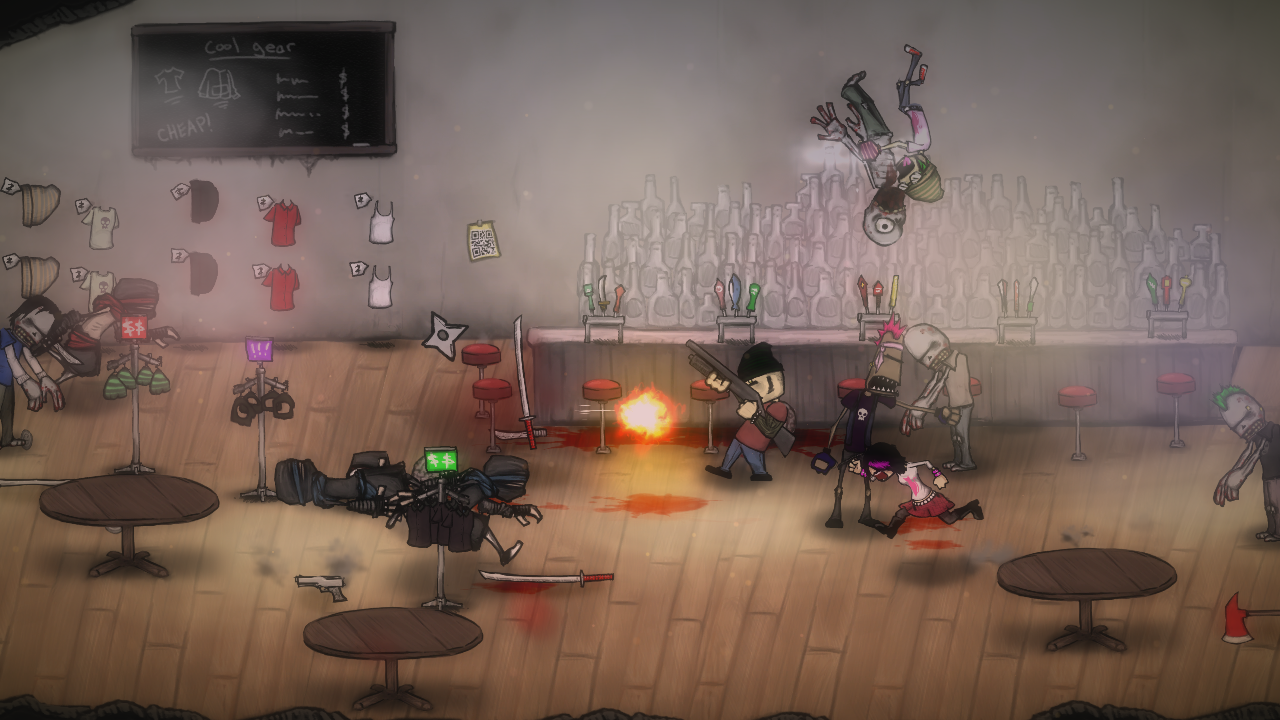
In Charlie Murder, players play as members of a garage punk rock band that is fighting a demonic army during the apocalypse.

Year	Title	Platform	Developers	Metacritic Score
2009	ZP2K9	XBLIG	James Silva	
2009	The Dishwasher: Dead Samurai	XBLA	James Silva	75
2009	I Made a Game with Zombies in It!	XBLIG	James Silva	
2010	ZP2KX	XBLIG	James Silva, Dustin Burg	
2011	The Dishwasher: Vampire Smile	XBLA/PC	James Silva, Dustin Burg	81
2012	Z0MB1ES (on teh ph0ne)	WP7	James Silva	
2013	Charlie Murder	XBLA/PC	James Silva, Michelle Juett Silva	78
2014	TIME VIKING!!!!!ANDSPACERAPTOR	XBLIG	James Silva, Michelle Juett Silva	
2016	Salt and Sanctuary	PS4/PC/PS VITA/Switch/XB1	James Silva, Michelle Juett Silva	85
2022	Salt and Sacrifice	PS5/PS4/PC/Switch	James Silva, Shane Lynch	72
