= Solar 2 =

2011 open world sandbox video game

- Developer: Jay Watts
- Publisher: Murudai
- Series: Solar series
- Engine: Microsoft XNA
- Platforms: Windows, Mac OS X, Linux, Android, iOS
- Release: Microsoft Windows; 17 June 2011; Xbox 360; 19 June 2011; Mac OS X; October 2012; Android, iOS; March 2013
- Genres: Open world, sandbox video game
- Mode: Single-player

Solar 2 is an open world sandbox video game developed by Australian developer Jay Watts' video game studio, Murudai. It was released on 17 June 2011 on Steam for Microsoft Windows and on 19 June 2011 on Xbox Live Indie Games for the Xbox 360. The game was developed with Microsoft's XNA tools, and its development was inspired by indie games such as flOw. The game follows the player in their mission to accumulate enough mass to become several astronomical objects, eventually becoming a Big Crunch, which then produces a Big Bang.

The game is a sequel to Solar (2009), and features most of the same key gameplay elements of its predecessor, expanded and polished considerably. It was developed over ten months and includes a score composed by sound designer and musician JP Neufeld. Solar 2 received mainly positive reviews from video game journalists, scoring 72 out of 100 on aggregate website Metacritic. It was awarded the first prize at the 2011 Microsoft Dream Build Play competition, and was among the video games showcased at the 10th Penny Arcade Expo.

== Gameplay ==
Solar 2 is an open world sandbox video game played from a two-dimensional perspective. The player is given an asteroid, and their main mission is to accumulate enough mass to become several astronomical objects. The game ends when and if the player manages to accumulate enough mass to become a Big Crunch, which then produces a Big Bang. However, the player is free to not finish the game, and is able to stay at the form of the object of their preference. Eight different objects are available in the game: asteroid, small planet, life planet, small star, medium star, large star, neutron star and black hole.

A player controls a medium size star with 5 orbiting planets. A mission start circle can be seen, along with arrows pointing to the other available missions.

The game takes place in a borderless and randomly generated universe, filled with asteroids, planets, stars and planetary systems. Life forms are also present in the game. They appear on planets sufficiently big to store life, and are represented by a variety of ships of different size and attack power. Spaceships are coloured green if they belong to the player's planet, or to a planet that belongs to the player's planetary system; red if they belong to an enemy planet or planetary system; and white if they don't belong to any planet or system. All the spaceships in the map are controlled by the game's artificial intelligence (AI), and they will constantly engage in combat against enemy ships, asteroids or planets to destroy them.

At the beginning of the game, the player accumulates mass by colliding their asteroid against other asteroids until enough mass has been gathered to become a small planet. From there, the player has to absorb other asteroids to make their planet grow enough to become a life planet; crashing against other objects will decrease the player's mass. At this point, life forms will evolve in the planet, creating spaceships, planetary shields and cannons. If the player wishes, they can accumulate more mass until their planet becomes a star. Life forms will disappear, but the player is able to attract planets to form a planetary system, further grow the star by absorbing other planets, or a combination of both. The player can also create multi-star systems by selecting planets from their system and make them absorb asteroids until they become another star.

Growing the star will increase its gravitational force, which increases the number of planets the planetary system can have. They are also able to attract planetary systems composed of stars with lower mass than that of the player, or being attracted to stars with bigger mass. If both stars collide, they will be reduced to a lesser size within the same type of object. For example, if the player controls a small star and collides against a medium star, the player will be disintegrated while the AI-controlled star will be reduced to a small star. Being reduced from a small star to a life planet is not possible, as well as being reduced from a small planet to an asteroid. In these cases, the player is respawned, with random mass, close to the place where they collided.

Solar 2 also includes a variety of achievements and object-oriented missions that can be played at any time. Missions can be found following the directional arrows in the interface, and the AI keeps track of which missions the player has finished. The game also keeps record of several accomplishments the player has reached, such as the distance travelled, the number of objects and enemies destroyed by the player or the spaceships belonging to the player. Solar 2 allows the player to save progress at any point. A "save system" feature is also present; it allows the player to save specific configurations of stars and planets that the player has created. The player can respawn from them at any time.

== Development ==
Solar 2 was developed by Jay Watts under his video game studio Murudai. Watts, who received a degree in biotechnology from an Australian college, had no previous knowledge of video game development prior to coding Solar 2's predecessor, Solar, for the Xbox 360. Development of Solar started in July 2008 as a Flash game. Many of the key gameplay elements featured in the sequel, such as the infinite sandbox, were envisioned during this timespan. In an interview with FleshEatingZipper, Watts revealed that Thatgamecompany's indie game flOw was an inspiration for him: "I loved the simplicity of the game and the ambiance." Solar, released in 2009, became a commercial success; it sold 30,000 copies and allowed Watts to work full-time on its sequel.

Development of Solar 2 lasted for at least ten months. The game was developed using Microsoft XNA, a set of tools focused on video game development created by Microsoft. According to Watts, Solar 2 was "mainly expanding on [Solar's] original idea and polishing it to perfection." However, he commented that the concept of both games took several design iterations to reach its final version: "I played with many, many ideas before finally settling on what I have now." Sound designer and musician JP Neufeld composed the game's score. According to Watts, this was done because there was "no way I could do music as good as he can." Both the Windows and Xbox 360 versions of the game were developed simultaneously. About the Xbox 360 version, Watts commented that "the lack of keyboards and the aging Xbox 360 hardware were a bit tricky, and updating the Xbox version is a huge pain to do."

== Release ==
Solar 2 was released on 17 June 2011 on Steam for Microsoft Windows and on 19 June 2011 on Xbox Live Indie Games for the Xbox 360. In July 2012, Watts announced that he was working on Mac OS X and Linux versions of the game. However, given that the original game was developed using the Windows-only XNA platform, he expected the ports to be ready sometime before the end of the year. In October 2012, the Mac port was announced and released on Steam. The iPad version of the game was released in March 2013. An Android version was also made available in March 2013.

== Reception ==
Reception

Aggregate score
Aggregator	Score
Metacritic	72%

Review scores
Publication	Score
GamePro	80%
IGN	8.0/10
PC Gamer (UK)	82%
AppSpy	4/5

Solar 2 received a positive response from video game journalists upon release. At Metacritic, which assigns a normalized rating out of 100 to reviews from mainstream critics, the game received an average score of 72 based on 8 reviews. Most critics praised the physics-based gameplay and soundtrack, but criticized the exceedingly difficult missions and somewhat repetitive gameplay. However, the game won the US$20,000 first prize at the 2011 Microsoft Dream Build Play competition, and became a finalist at the 2011 IndieCade festival. Solar 2 was also among the ten indie video games showcased at the 10th Penny Arcade Expo, held in August 2011.

IGN's Gord Goble criticized the difficulty of the missions but praised the game's soundtrack, which he called a combination of "new age-meets-Alan Parsons Project-meets-Pink Floyd-meets-2001: A Space Odyssey audioscape." He also highlighted several features he would have liked to see in the game, such as a more complex universe to explore and the ability to control the life forms in the planets controlled by the player. Graham Smith from PC Gamer was also critical of the missions' difficulty, although concluded that it was "a good price for a universe." GamePro's Nate Ralph mentioned the life forms as the only negative aspect of the game.

The iPad and Android versions of Solar 2 were also well received. AppSpy's Andrew Nesvadba, on his review of the iPad version of the game, highlighted the overall sense that "nothing about the game feels like a waste of time or effort," but criticized the lack of control over the life forms. Meanwhile, Andrew Martonik from Android Central acknowledged that Solar 2 had all the elements necessary for a great game.
