= Xona Games =

Canadian independent video game developer

- Type: Private
- Industry: Video games
- Founded: 2008
- Headquarters: Yarmouth, Nova Scotia, Canada
- Key people: Jason Doucette, Matthew Doucette
- Number of employees: 2
- Website: xona.com

Xona Games is an independent Canadian video game developer founded in 2008 and headquartered in Yarmouth, Nova Scotia, Canada.

== Games ==
The company makes shoot 'em up games, targeting primarily Xbox LIVE Indie Games and Xbox LIVE Arcade which are especially popular in the Japanese market. The company and many of their games have won awards, including the Rogers Small Business Big Idea Contest.

Games released by Xona Games:

Year	Title	Platform	Publisher	Notes
2010	Decimation X	Xbox 360	Xona Games	#1 in Japan
2010	Decimation X2	Windows Phone 7	Xona Games	Launch Title
2010	Decimation X3	Xbox 360	Reverb Communications	#1 in 4 Countries; Indie Games Uprising
2010	Score Rush	Xbox 360	Reverb Communications	#1 in Japan;
2012	Score Rush	Turbulenz	Turbulenz	
2012	Score Rush MP	Turbulenz	Turbulenz	
2016	Score Rush Extended 撃点	PlayStation 4	Reverb Communications	80 Metacritic; #64 Best PS4 Game of 2016

Additional games in development by Xona Games include a new version of Score Rush, Decimation X4, and Duality ZF. Xona Games was announced as an official ID@Xbox Xbox One Developer.

== Awards ==
Xona Games' games has won a total of $190,177.83 in contests, including the $100,000 Innovacorp I-3 competition and the $50,000 Tizen App Challenge. Decimation X3 was named one of the top Xbox Live Indie Games by Official Xbox Magazine. Duality ZF was a finalist in the 2010 Dream.Build.Play contest, ranking #5 worldwide.
