= Boundless (video game) =

2018 massively multiplayer online sandbox game

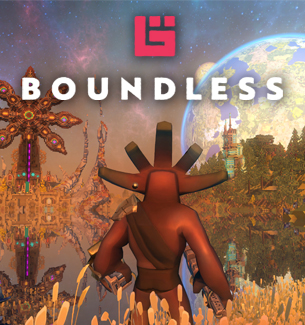
- Developers: Wonderstruck Games (2014–2022); Monumental LLC (2022–present)
- Publishers: Wonderstruck Games (2014–2022); Monumental LLC (2022–present)
- Platforms: Microsoft Windows; OS X; PlayStation 4
- Release: September 11, 2018
- Genres: Massively multiplayer online, Sandbox
- Mode: Multiplayer

Boundless is a massively multiplayer online sandbox game, developed by Guildford-based studio Wonderstruck Games. It was released through Early access on Steam for Microsoft Windows and OS X on November 13, 2014. It was fully released on September 11, 2018, and features online cross-play across all regions with PlayStation 4.

== Gameplay ==
Played in either first-person or third-person perspective, players control a customisable avatar around procedurally generated planets, made up of various types and shapes of blocks. Players interact with these blocks and discover ancient technologies to help craft tools, weapons and machines which can then be used to shape the world around them into buildings, vast cities and guilds, and eventually allow players to open warps and portals to other worlds.

Players are able to gather resources from their local environment, which are then used to survive and build equipment. Bases are built in the form of Beacons, which reserve an area for a particular player, protecting the land from being mined or otherwise edited by others.

Players must also deal with hostile wildlife and survival matters such as hunger to survive in the alien universe of the game. Players are able to explore solo, or to play together in groups. Large groups of players collaborate to build intricate projects or undertake large-scale hunts.

== Development ==
In July 2014, the game was announced as a goal-funded project under the title of Oort Online. It quickly gained traction with its online audience as a browser-based game and reached its first funding goal in early August 2014. After quickly outgrowing the capabilities of the browser and the scope of the original game, it was decided that Oort Online would appeal to a wider audience under the Steam Greenlight system and was successfully greenlit in September 2014.

Oort Online underwent a name change in October 2015 to the current title Boundless. Also in October 2015, it was announced that Boundless had been backed by Sony to be a console exclusive on their PlayStation 4 platform, allowing both PS4 and PC players to share the same online universe and play together. All planets in Boundless can be visited by using Portal technology, allowing players to step from one world to another in real time.

As of September 11, 2022, after an extended development lull due to Wonderstruck assisting Larian Studios with Baldur's Gate 3, it was announced on the Boundless Forums that the development and rights to the game had been sold to the American Video Game developer Monumental, LLC, who would be taking over future updates and development of the game.

== Release ==
Boundless was developed and published by Wonderstruck. Boundless was released on Steam Early Access for Microsoft Windows and OS X on November 13, 2014. Boundless was released on PlayStation 4 on September 11, 2018, officially coming out of Early Access the same day on PC.

== Reception ==
Reception

Review score
Publication	Score
Push Square	5/10
