= Zeit² =

2011 video game

- Developer(s): Brightside Games
- Publisher(s): Ubisoft
- Platform(s): Windows, Xbox 360 (XBLA)
- Release: January 12, 2011
- Genre(s): Scrolling shooter
- Mode(s): Single-player

Zeit² (also known as Zeit Squared) is a horizontally scrolling shooter made by German developer Brightside Games. It was released for Microsoft Windows and Xbox Live Arcade on January 12, 2011. The word "Zeit" is German for time.

== Gameplay ==
Zeit² is a horizontally scrolling shooter which allows players to move forward and backward in time, making it possible for the player to combine shots and power, and even be assisted by a shadow version of the player.

The game has seventy challenges and eight bosses, as well as six game modes, including Score Attack, Survival, Wave, Time Limit, and Tactics.

== Reception ==
Reception

Aggregate score
Aggregator	Score	
Aggregator	PC	Xbox 360
Metacritic	72/100	71/100

Review scores
Publication	Score	
Publication	PC	Xbox 360
Destructoid	N/A	8/10
Eurogamer	N/A	8/10
GameSpot	8/10	8/10
IGN	7/10	7/10
Official Xbox Magazine (UK)	N/A	6/10
Official Xbox Magazine (US)	N/A	7/10
PC PowerPlay	6/10	N/A
411Mania	N/A	7.8/10
Metro	N/A	6/10

Zeit² received "average" reviews on both platforms according to the review aggregation website Metacritic.

Zeit² was in the Top 20 of Microsoft Dream Build Play 2008, an Independent Games Festival 2009 Student Showcase Finalist and Indie Game Challenge 2010 Finalist.
