= Salt and Sacrifice =

- Developer: Ska Studios
- Publisher: Ska Studios
- Platforms: PlayStation 4; PlayStation 5; Windows; Mac; Nintendo Switch
- Release: PS4, PS5, Windows, Mac; May 10, 2022; Nintendo Switch; November 7, 2023
- Genres: Action role-playing, metroidvania
- Modes: Single-player, multiplayer

Salt and Sacrifice is an action role-playing video game developed and published by Ska Studios. As the sequel to Salt and Sanctuary, the game was released on May 10, 2022, for PlayStation 4, PlayStation 5, and Windows. It was later ported to Nintendo Switch on November 7, 2023.

== Gameplay ==
Similar to its predecessor, Salt and Sacrifice was inspired by the Dark Souls series of games. Instead of having one large map, the world is split into five separate zones. To progress in the game and unlock new areas, the player must devour Mage hearts and initiate Mage Hunts, in which the player character has to chase down and defeat various boss characters. Each defeated mage will drop unique armor and weapons which can be picked up and used. Each weapon has its own unique skills and movesets. While the player is exploring the world, they will encounter hidden tomes which can be used to initiate Fated Mage hunts. The player can go through these hunts repeatedly in order to collect specific upgrades. The game features elements commonly seen in Metroidvania games. Previously out-of-reach areas can be accessed once the player collects the necessary traversal items. They will gradually discover different shortcuts that allow them to traverse quickly, though the game does not have a fast travel option.

Unlike Salt and Sanctuary, the game has online multiplayer. Players can join different multiplayer factions. The Shroud Alliance will invade another player's session and hunt them down, while Blueheart Runners can summon enemies called Haze Burnt to kill the hosting player. The invaded players can also recruit the help from Oathbound Watchers and Sheriff Inquisitors, who will assist them in combat. Using a private passcode system, two players can complete the campaign cooperatively without being invaded.

== Development ==
Salt & Sacrifice is the sequel to Salt and Sanctuary, a game developed by the husband-and-wife team Ska Studios, James and Michelle Silva. While the game was in production, James showed screenshots to his friend, Shane Lynch, who suggested that it should have online multiplayer. Multiplayer was also the most requested feature for Salt and Sanctuary's players. Within weeks, Lynch was able to produce the netcode necessary to run a multiplayer game. According to Silva, the team developed the game "from the ground up as a multiplayer game", and ensured that players can join other players' session in a more accessible and seamless way. While Silva originally envisioned the game as a more linear experience with several short missions, Lynch convinced him to change the scope of the game to focus more on exploration. Monster Hunter was also an important source of inspiration for the team.

Salt and Sacrifice was announced in June 2021 by Ska Studios. The game was released for Windows via the Epic Games Store, PlayStation 4 and PlayStation 5 on May 10, 2022, and was released for Nintendo Switch and Windows via Steam on November 7, 2023.

== Reception ==
Reception

Aggregate score
Aggregator	Score
Metacritic	(PC) 72/100 (PS5) 73/100

Review scores
Publication	Score
Game Informer	7/10
GameSpot	7/10
Hardcore Gamer	4/5
IGN	7/10
Push Square	6/10
Shacknews	8/10
The Games Machine (Italy)	8.3/10

Salt and Sacrifice received "mixed or average" reviews, according to review aggregator Metacritic.

John Carson of Game Informer gave the game a 7 out of 10 and praised the exploration and atmosphere and heavily panned its crafting and progression mechanics while comparing the title unfavorably to its predecessor. Richard Wakeling of GameSpot praised the labyrinthine world, tense boss battles, enemy difficulty, and responsive combat while lamenting the absence of a fast-travel system and overly punishing combat. Mitchell Saltzman of IGN noted that the bits Salt and Sacrifice inherited from its predecessor were its strongest points and praised its attempt to infuse the 2D platforming genre with soulslike design and Monster Hunter-like combat. Ozzie Mejia of Shacknews commended the platforming, combat, variety of classes, skill tree, metroidvania elements, and co-op while taking minor issue with its resource-driven healing and unreliable controls.
