= Turbulenz =

British video game developer

- Type: Private
- Industry: Video games
- Founded: 2009; 17 years ago
- Headquarters: Guildford, United Kingdom
- Key people: James Austin (CEO)
- Website: biz.turbulenz.com

Turbulenz was a video game development company based in the United Kingdom, and was focused on HTML5 game development. They created a HTML5 game engine also named Turbulenz. The company published third party video games as well as developing their own.

== History ==
Turbulenz was founded in 2009 in Guildford, United Kingdom, by several former industry veteran from Electronic Arts and Criterion, after raising $5 million in funding. Some of the funds raised were set aside to help developers work on browser game. Gavin Shields is the chief operating officer, and David Galeano is the chief technology officer (CTO). The company's goal is to create an end-to-end platform for creating, publishing and monetizing web games. In 2012, several game industry veterans from Lionhead Studios joined the company to create a new game. Shields stated that the ability to recruit industry veterans validated the company's direction in promoting HTML5 gaming.

== Turbulenz engine ==
Turbulenz's primary product is an HTML5 game engine. It supports 3D graphics, dynamic lighting, shadow maps, physics, 2D animations, and audio. It relies on WebGL, Web Audio and JavaScript, and is intended to support the development of web browser based games. The engine is supported by a development community hub site and a consumer store site.

In 2013, the engine was made open source under the MIT license. It was the first 3D JavaScript engine to be made open source. At the time, there were over 3000 developers working with the engine, and the company was working towards mobile and tablet support.

The engine has been used for third party games such as Denki's Save the Day and Xona Games' Score Rush.

In 2015, it was announced that Turbulenz's game Boundless, which uses the engine, would be released on PlayStation 4.

In 2021, it was bought by Larian Studios and integrated

== Games ==
Turbulenz has also developed and released games using its engine. The games are released under their first party team, Wonderstruck Games.

Game	Year	Platform(s)
Polycraft	2013	Web
The Marvellous Miss Take	2014	Microsoft Windows, Mac OS
Boundless (Originally Oort Online)	2017	Microsoft Windows, PlayStation 4
