= One Finger Death Punch =

2013 video game

- Developer: Silver Dollar Games
- Publishers: Silver Dollar Games; Mobirix (Android, iOS)
- Designers: Jon Flook; David Flook
- Engine: Microsoft XNA
- Platforms: Android; iOS; Microsoft Windows; Xbox 360
- Release: Xbox 360: WW: June 24, 2013; Microsoft Windows: WW: March 3, 2014; Android: WW: March 25, 2015; iOS: WW: June 12, 2015
- Genres: Action, beat 'em up
- Mode: Single-player

One Finger Death Punch is a beat 'em up video game developed and produced by Canadian indie studio Silver Dollar Games. It was originally released for Xbox 360 on June 24, 2013 and Microsoft Windows on March 3, 2014, then was ported to Android on March 25, 2015 and ported to iOS on June 12, 2015. The game has two main modes; a campaign and survival mode. In the campaign, the player must navigate a map and beat all of the levels whilst the survival mode has the player fight as long as they can before dying.

== Gameplay ==
In-game screenshot of a boss battle

One Finger Death Punch is an indie beat 'em up video game where players must survive rounds of enemies in the many different stages using the left and right mouse buttons. Players press either the left or right button, corresponding to which side of their character the enemies are currently on.

There are three difficulty modes both in the story mode and the survival mode: Student, Master, and Grandmaster. These difficulty levels have an effect on how many enemies there are in each stage, the speed of each round, and number of hit-points that the player has.

There are many different rounds in the story mode that each have different weapons, special requirements, and unique elements of gameplay. Some of these include the Light Sword or Nunchaku rounds, where the enemies are all one hit, but they increase in speed and number as time goes on. Boss battles consist of one enemy that has a health bar and requires a certain pattern of buttons to defeat. The pattern is displayed to the user by blue and red bars that represent in what order the player should press the left and right buttons, respectively. Missing a button press or pressing the incorrect mouse button will result in the boss hitting the player.

There are a few versions of the survival mode within One Finger Death Punch. Plain survival mode will place the player in an endless Mob Round with some of the other unique gameplay sections randomly occurring, such as a Light Sword section. Blind survival mode makes it so the player cannot see the bar underneath enemies indicating how many times they must be hit and in what order, nor the indication of when they are in range. The player can only rely their reaction time and the color of the enemies, with prompts appearing only for enemies that require a special combination of button presses. There is also a third, secret survival mode, which is the plain survival mode crossed over with Silver Dollar Games' No Luca No, where the player must push away a cat named Luca from the center of the screen using the mouse cursor as Luca appears from the left and right side of the screen, blocking the view. Unlocking the second and third survival modes requires at least 500 kills in a round of the preceding survival mode.

== Reception ==
Reception

Review scores
Publication	Score
Multiplayer.it	8/10 (PC)
GameBlog (FR)	7/10 (PC)
Hooked Gamers	7/10 (PC)

One Finger Death Punch received positive reviews from critics, praising its simple controls, large amount of content and its visual style. However, critics picked up on the game's repetitive nature. Erwan Lafleuriel from Gameblog commented on One Finger Death Punch's simple controls by saying that the game was "Easy to learn, but challenging enough to pass many levels with honours". Hooked Gamers' Matt Porter said that people "could even play One Finger Death Punch with one finger", he concluded the review commenting about the simplistic game mechanics with "The depth behind the simplistic control scheme is impressive up to a point, until it all starts to get a bit samey".

== One Finger Death Punch 2 ==
One Finger Death Punch 2 was announced on the Silver Dollar Games Facebook page on March 3, 2018, quote, "One Finger Death Punch 2 coming when it's ready." The game was released on 15 April 2019, and on September 30, 2020 for PlayStation 4.
