= Yo-Ho Kablammo =

2009 video game

- Developer: Canalside Studios
- Publisher: Microsoft Studios
- Platform: Xbox 360
- Release: September 2, 2009
- Genre: Shoot 'em up
- Modes: Single-player, Multiplayer

Yo-Ho Kablammo is a pirate-themed arena shooter for Xbox Live Arcade, developed by Canalside Studios, the game was released for the Xbox 360 on September 2, 2009.

== Overview ==
Yo-Ho Kablammo was the 2007 runner-up for Microsoft's Dream.Build.Play. competition, which rewarded Xbox Live Indie developers with a contract deal to upgrade to an XBLA release. The winner was Dishwasher: Dead Samurai, released in 2009.

Gameplay features pirate-ship combat in which players fight from an overhead perspective. Using the left stick to moves the ship and the triggers fire cannons. The game featured single player modes and multiplayer online and offline.

== Release ==
Reception

Aggregate score
Aggregator	Score
Metacritic	PC: 55/100

Yo-Ho Kablammo received "mixed or average" reviews according to Metacritic.

In a written review, IGN called the game "mediocre" and "simple". However, recommended the title for a younger audience.
