= Canalside Studios =

English games company

- Industry: Video games
- Headquarters: Huddersfield, England
- Key people: Dr Duke Gledhill; Matthew Novak; Dr Daryl Marples; Matthew McIntosh
- Products: Yo-Ho Kablammo; Missing Reel; Lapsus; Katu Toka; CataCommotion; Hover Havok; Pocket Galaxy; Flux8; Coin-Op Kingdom
- Website: canalsidestudios.com

Canalside Studios is a games company within the University of Huddersfield in West Yorkshire, England. The studio is permanently staffed by a core team of 8 placement students. Plans are in place for full-time students studying games-oriented courses to contribute content through projects to get their name in the credits.

== History ==
Canalside Studios was founded in 2006 to aid the professional development of computer games students and to help them find employment within the industry.

In 2007, Canalside Studios achieved second place in the Microsoft XNA Dream Build Play competition with Yo-Ho Kablammo. The game was released on 12 September 2009 on Xbox Live Arcade and received positive reviews from the arcade community.

Following Yo-Ho Kablammo, Canalside Studios released a B-movie themed shooter titled Missing Reel for Xbox Live Indie Games.

Canalside Studios was contracted by the Royal Armouries to produce educational games for display at its museum in Leeds and also developed two games for display at the Frazier History Museum in Kentucky.

Descentium is a title currently in development.

== Awards and recognition ==
- "Game Republic 2019" – 2nd Place Best Team
- "Game Republic 2019" – 2nd Place Best Game Audio
- "Game Republic 2018" – Best Team
- "Game Republic 2018" – Best Game Design
- "Game Republic 2018" – 2nd Place Best Game Technology
- "Grads in Games Awards 2018" – Nominated Best Student Game
- "Game Republic 2016" – Best Team
- "Game Republic 2016" – 2nd Place Best Art & Animation
- "Game Republic 2016" – 2nd Place Best Game Technology
- "Game Republic 2016" – 3rd Place Best Design
- "X48 Game Competition 2010" – Best Art
- "Game Republic 2009" – Best Games Design
- "Game Republic 2009" – Best Team
- "Game Republic 2009" – Best Technical
- "X48 Game Competition 2009" – 1st Prize
- "X48 Game Competition 2009" – 2nd Prize
- "X48 Game Competition 2009" – Most Experimental Game
- "UK Imagine Cup" – 2008 Winners
- "Dream Build Play 2007" – 2nd Place
