= Salt and Sanctuary =

2016 video game

- Developer: Ska Studios
- Publisher: Ska Studios
- Designer: James Silva
- Platforms: PlayStation 4; Microsoft Windows; macOS; Linux; PlayStation Vita; Nintendo Switch; Xbox One
- Release: March 15, 2016: PlayStation 4; March 15, 2016; Windows; May 17, 2016; macOS, Linux; July 8, 2016; PlayStation Vita; March 28, 2017; Nintendo Switch; August 2, 2018; Xbox One; February 6, 2019
- Genres: Action role-playing, Metroidvania
- Modes: Single-player, multiplayer

Salt and Sanctuary is a 2D action role-playing video game developed and published by Ska Studios. The game was released on March 15, 2016 for the PlayStation 4, with later releases for Microsoft Windows, macOS, Linux, PlayStation Vita, Xbox One, and Nintendo Switch. It is heavily inspired by the Dark Souls series by FromSoftware.

The game received positive reception from critics, who praised its graphical style and gameplay. A sequel, Salt and Sacrifice, was released in 2022.

== Gameplay ==
Salt and Sanctuary combines aspects of the Metroidvania and Soulslike genres. The game features 2D hand drawn visuals, as well as gameplay mechanics similar to the Dark Souls series. There are 600 items players may use, and the several weapon categories have special movesets including air attacks. Players can wield two handed weapons for additional power, and shields to defend and parry. Magic and ranged attacks can also be performed. The game implements RPG concepts such as origins, classes and stat development, as well as an extensive skill tree providing hundreds of combinations. The game also provides a local multiplayer option for co-operative and versus play, and asynchronous features such as messages that may be interchanged between players.

== Plot ==
The game begins with the player stowed away in a ship that is also carrying a princess from an unnamed country who is to be married to an opposing country's king in order to avert war. However, a group of marauders attack the ship, murdering its crew. If the player kills all the marauders and escapes to the deck, they are then set upon by a giant "Kraekan" (a corruption of kraken) of the sea resembling Cthulhu. Whether or not they are able to defeat the marauders and the powerful kraeken, the ship is wrecked, sending them drifting to shore on a mysterious island.

There, the player meets a strange old man who gives them an icon of one of three creeds the player says they are a member of, helping them in their quest to find the lost princess. The player places this icon in the first Sanctuary and then continues exploring the island, gathering salt in order to gain power, as in this universe, There are two types of human: Saltborn and Lightborn. Saltborn are ostensibly largely composed of salt, while Lightborn are made out of light. Once a Saltborn dies, they will be sent to the Isle of Salt, while Lightborns will cease to exist. Lightborns can become gods, while Saltborns cannot (This is why the Nameless God imprisons The Three and steals their prayers). There, it is possible to meet several non-player characters with side stories, an unnamed Knight, Thief, and Sorcerer. The player also meets a highly sinister talking Scarecrow that threatens that they will perish.

In the process of conversing with these NPCs throughout the journey, they come to realize that the island is made up of copies of dangerous locations from the various continents of the world, and that some kind of power "collected" them. The player realizes that the Scarecrow is the avatar of a being known as the Nameless God, and also that the princess they were searching for may not have even been royalty, but rather a slave that was to be sacrificed to the Nameless God in exchange for ending the current war, as has been done many times in the past. An optional boss fight also reveals that the Nameless God has killed the current gods of the world, known as the Three, by trapping them in special coffins and receiving and answering prayers meant for them, as gods require worship to survive.

Finally, the main character meets the old man for the final time, and he reveals that he was once Jaret, a great king who once ruled the island and agreed to be the servant of the Nameless God in exchange for power. The Nameless God is an incredibly powerful being who is Saltborn (i.e. mortal), but desires to be a divine being, yet is unable to no matter how much power he collects due to him not having a soul of fire like other gods.

The player travels to the Nameless God's castle and defeats him, finding a well with which they are able to escape from the island and presumably end the cycle of war that the Nameless God perpetuated. Alternatively, they can choose to pick up the Nameless God's helmet and gain his full power, but be trapped on the island.

== Development ==
The game was first announced in an open letter from the developer to the PlayStation Blog on August 28, 2014. The game was released for the PlayStation 4 worldwide on March 15, 2016, and for Microsoft Windows on May 17, 2016. The game also released on PlayStation Vita on March 28, 2017. A Nintendo Switch port, handled by BlitWorks, was released worldwide on August 2, 2018 via the Nintendo eShop, with a physical retail released on December 11, 2018, under the title Salt and Sanctuary: Drowned Tome Edition.

The initial idea behind the game was conceived as a fusion of the combat of the Dark Souls series with the studio's previous Dishwasher series. The Castlevania series, particularly Symphony of the Night and the later Nintendo DS installments (which are noted for their free-roaming exploration-based design), also served as inspiration for the gameplay. The tech demo received a large amount of positive feedback, so the developers decided to continue with that idea.

The game took about two and a half years to develop, though the underlying systems were created before development started in earnest. The original game as designed was much more complex, but some cuts had to be made due to the small size of the development team.

== Reception ==
Reception

Aggregate score
| Aggregator | Score |
|---|---|
| Metacritic | PS4: 84/100; PC: 84/100; NS: 82/100; XONE: 80/100 |

Review scores
| Publication | Score |
|---|---|
| Famitsu | 8/10, 9/10, 8/10, 9/10 |
| Game Informer | 8.5/10 |
| IGN | 8.6/10 |

Salt and Sanctuary received "generally favorable" reception, according to review aggregator website Metacritic.

IGN awarded it a score of 8.6 out of 10, saying "You could call Salt and Sanctuary a 2D mashup of Dark Souls and Castlevania, and you'd be right. But such a simple pronouncement would be a disservice to the tremendous amount of thought that's gone into Salt and Sanctuary, whether it's in the graphic style that evokes horror through the style of comic strips or in the intricate web of dungeons and castles serves as it[s] map."

Pascal Tekaia of RPGamer rated the game 4.5/5, calling it "a remarkable fusion of several distinct styles" and "more than just a passable clone", while expressing dismay at the minimalist storyline and what he called "cheap deaths".

Griffin McElroy of Polygon rated the game 9/10, saying that it accomplished the "impossible" feat of "borrow[ing] the mechanics of another game franchise without getting lost in derivation". He called the game a "loving" adaptation that rivals even its source material.

Favorably comparing the game's mechanics to Dark Souls and Castlevania, Game Informer reviewer Matt Miller said, "Salt and Sanctuary deserves consideration in the same breath as the games to which it pays homage."

All four reviewers in Famitsu compared the game to Dark Souls with two saying the game was not quite original, but fun for the type for the kind of game it was with two describing the sense of accomplishment from progressive with the games high difficulty being a highlight.

In a review of Salt and Sanctuary in Black Gate, John ONeill said "Salt and Sanctuary isn't a bad game by any means, but it's one of those games that comes so close to greatness. The Souls formula is one of those things that will make a game — or break it if you get it wrong. The game has the basic parts parts right, but misses the execution that has helped Soulsborne thrive."
