= The Marvellous Miss Take =

2014 video game

- Developer: Wonderstruck
- Publisher: Rising Star Games
- Platforms: Windows, macOS
- Release: November 20, 2014
- Genre: Stealth
- Mode: Single-player

The Marvellous Miss Take is a 2014 stealth video game developed by Wonderstruck and published by Rising Star Games. The player character Sophia Take is the heiress to her great-aunt's art collection, which is sold off to private collectors. The objective of the game is to steal the collection, displayed in art galleries across London, while avoiding security measures such as guards and cameras. Designed to have only nonviolent gameplay, the game was released in November 2014 for Windows and macOS. Reviewers praised the variety of mechanics offered by additional player characters besides Sophia, but criticised the level design as repetitive and inhibiting gameplay.

== Gameplay ==
The Marvellous Miss Take is a 3D stealth video game. The player character Sophia Take (also known as Miss Take) is the heiress to her great-aunt's art collection, which is sold off to private collectors. Miss Take retrieves her inheritance by heisting the collection, which is displayed across twenty-five art galleries in London. To evade security measures such as guards and cameras, the player can avoid their field of vision, make noise to distract them, or use gadgets such as noisemakers or teleporters. After successfully stealing from a gallery, the player can replay the level with two other characters, Harry and Daisy, each with different gameplay mechanics; the galleries change slightly depending on which character is being played.

== Development ==
The idea for The Marvellous Miss Take's Sophia Take arose from an office party where a Wonderstruck employee complained about his efforts to find a "female action figure for his daughter" for Christmas. A coworker suggested in response that the studio "make the main character of its latest project... a woman", resulting in Miss Take's creation. According to Wonderstruck designer and programmer Chris Matthews, the studio chose to implement solely nonviolent gameplay mechanics to keep the player continually aware of their environment. The studio cited an interview by Shigeru Miyamoto about the difficulty of Super Mario Bros. as inspiration for Harry's player design; Matthews characterised Harry's gameplay as "the expert mode", providing additional gameplay for a gallery level using a "different set of skills, with different paths open and closed to you, and [with] different objectives".

The Marvellous Miss Take was released on November 20, 2014 for Windows and macOS, and was published by Rising Star Games.

== Reception ==
Reception

Aggregate score
Aggregator	Score
Metacritic	69/100 (Note: Score based on 11 reviews.)

Review scores
Publication	Score
GameSpot	6/10
GamesTM	6/10
PC Gamer (US)	68/100
The Guardian	4/5

The Marvellous Miss Take received "mixed or average" reviews according to the review aggregator Metacritic. Reviewers praised the diversity of mechanics offered by the three player characters, but criticised the level design as repetitive and inhibiting gameplay. GamesTM regarded the choice of multiple characters, each with different gameplay mechanics, as "a clever way to flesh out the game". Writing for GameSpot, Jeremy Signor believed this design was effective for encouraging different playstyles: Signor argued that Daisy's pickpocketing mechanic, which requires players to stand right next to guards to steal keys, taught the player to play more confidently around guards when playing as Sophia. However, he claimed that the level design made sneaking around frustrating because of the perceived abundance of guards with random patrol routes, "cramped corridors", and "tiny rooms". PC Gamer's Tyler Wilde also criticised the randomised guard patrols as unreliable and unfun to interact with, and opined that the game became tedious because of traps that took "advantage of an imprecise movement system".

Sophia Take's design was well-received: Ronan Price of the Irish Independent compared the game's plot to the 1966 heist film How to Steal a Million and Sophia to the film's main actress Audrey Hepburn, while GamesTM regarded Miss Take's story as well-written but "presented without the flair of her art-nabbing qualities". Reviewers offered differing opinions on the game's visuals: Rory Summerley of TheGuardian.com considered them "attractive" and effective for displaying situational information, while Tyler Wilde praised the art style but claimed that "the 25 [art galleries] are so visually similar that they blend together". The galleries were also criticised by Jeremy Signor as "looking very sterile and plain"; conversely, GamesTM regarded them as "opulent", albeit with "no London personality".
