= Survival Crisis Z =

2004 video game

- Developer: Ska Studios
- Publisher: Ska Studios
- Platform: Windows
- Release: 2004
- Genres: Role-playing video game, Survival horror
- Mode: Single player

Survival Crisis Z is a video game within both the role playing and survival horror genres for Microsoft Windows. The game was published in 2004 by developer Ska Studios. The game takes place in a city during the wake of a zombie apocalypse. Players assume the role of a survivor, and are given free rein in how they deal with the hostile world.

The game is distributed as a freeware digital download.

== Gameplay ==
Two game modes can be played, the first is Arcade Mode and entails surviving for as long as possible against an onslaught of zombies, this mode has been compared to Robotron: 2084. In the Story Mode, the player must scavenge for supplies, eat due to hunger and sleep to prevent fatigue, as well as improve skills to increase the chances of continued survival. In addition to the zombie horde, two factions are present on the city streets; the Rebels and SWAT. The player can join either faction or remain neutral.

The zombies function as the antagonists of the game, and while they are dangerous at night they can be used to attack faction members if they are lured to the zombies' locations. Three episodes are available in Story Mode with different missions and more enemies. The player advances the plot by taking missions or work from faction leaders. In work missions, the player can take over houses, look for secret dungeons, eliminate rival houses with C4 or simply roam the map looking for items and weapons to trade; as long as they watch out for threats from the post-apocalyptic world—living or dead. In missions the player performs special tasks like saving a scientist who is researching a cure.

There are a number of strategies to employ, weapons to use, and skills to help the player. The player character and party can be configured to accommodate different play styles, all the while dealing with the swelling ranks of living dead.
