= Apple Jack (video game) =

2010 video game

- Developer: My Owl Software
- Publisher: My Owl Software
- Composer: Josh Woodward
- Platform: Xbox 360
- Release: 29 May 2010
- Genre: Puzzle-platform
- Mode: Single-player

Apple Jack is a puzzle-platform video game developed by British indie developer Tim Sycamore under the name My Owl Software. It was released on 29 May 2010 through Xbox Live for the Xbox 360.

== Gameplay ==
The game's plot revolves around Apple Jack rescuing his dog from Mount Snowdon in Wales. There are 5 counties depicted in the game with each one having 20 levels in total.

== Development and release ==
Apple Jack was developed by Tim Sycamore under the name My Owl Software; the name was taken from the song "My Owl", by the band Ectogram. Sycamore had some experience programming for the Amiga. With the announcement of Xbox Live Indie Games, he wanted to create a "proper, sellable" video game. Apple Jack was developed part-time in around a year using C#. Super Mario Bros. 2 (1988) was the game's main inspiration regarding mechanics. Sycamore tried to make the game "very British" in regards to tone and humour, similarly to ZX Spectrum games such as Manic Miner and Monty Mole. The levels were designed from first to last, with whatever idea he had being used in the next level. He felt balancing the game's difficulty was hard; while, in general, the levels get progressively harder, some difficulty spikes are present.

The main character was inspired by The Son of Man, a painting by René Magritte. Sycamore also appreciated characters with big heads, and an apple head seemed to fit this description. When designing the enemies, Sycamore was inspired by "madness", with the enemies being unrelated to the environment or with each other, an aspect which added "surreal randomness" to the game, in his view. Programming these enemies was the hardest programming aspect of the development. Sycamore felt an acoustic guitar soundtrack would fit the rural setting of the game. After looking for free acoustic music on Google, he used the instrumental tracks provided by Josh Woodward. Apple Jack was released on 29 May 2010 as part of Xbox Live Indie Games.

== Reception ==
Reception

Review scores
Publication	Score
Edge	8/10
Eurogamer	9/10
Official Xbox Magazine (UK)	5/5

Apple Jack received positive reviews. Scott Nichols of Digital Spy said the game obtained a notable fan following due to its peculiar humor and appealing gameplay. In July 2010, Sycamore reported the game had sold 4,500 copies by then, higher than what he had expected.

A sequel, Apple Jack 2, was released in 2012. Apple Jack 1&2, which compiles Apple Jack and its sequel, was released for PC in 2013.
