= Biology Battle =

2008 video game

- Developer(s): Novaleaf
- Platform(s): Xbox 360 (XBLIG), Windows
- Release: November 19, 2008: Xbox; March 2010: Windows
- Genre(s): Multidirectional shooter
- Mode(s): Single-player, Multiplayer

Biology Battle is a multidirectional shooter for the Xbox 360 and Microsoft Windows. It is a dual-stick shooter with elements similar to Robotron: 2084, Smash TV, and Geometry Wars.

== Development ==
According to an interview with Novaleaf Game Studios, the game cost US$100,000 to make, higher than other XBLIG games.

The game was written using C# and XNA.

== Reception ==
Reception

Aggregate scores
Aggregator	Score
GameRankings	71.25%
Metacritic	69/100

Review scores
Publication	Score
Destructoid	8/10
Eurogamer	5/10
VideoGamer.com	7/10

Biology Battle received mixed reviews upon release. On Metacritic, the Xbox 360 version of the game holds a score of 69/100 based on 13 reviews, indicating "mixed or average reviews". On GameRankings, the Xbox 360 version of the game holds a score of 71.25% based on 12 reviews.
