= Blazing Birds =

2009 sports video game

- Cover art on the Xbox Live Marketplace
- Developers: Vector 2 Games (now Silver Dollar Games)
- Publisher: Microsoft Game Studios
- Producer: Mark Coates
- Designer: David Flook
- Platform: Xbox 360 (XBLA)
- Release: May 20, 2009
- Genres: Sports, action
- Modes: Single-player, Multiplayer

Blazing Birds is a badminton-like action-sports video game developed by Vector 2 Games (now Silver Dollar Games) and published by Microsoft Games Studios. It was released on May 20, 2009, worldwide for the Xbox 360 (Xbox Live Arcade).

== Gameplay ==
The game's campaign mode consists of three levels of difficulty, each with 20 matches. The player must win all 60 matches to unlock the final match against Signum IV. The game also features a multiplayer mode, which allows up to four players to compete against each other in local matches.

Power-ups can be collected during gameplay to give players an advantage. For example, the speed power-up will make the player's character move faster, while the strength power-up will make their shots hit harder. The game's graphics are colorful and vibrant, and the sound effects are realistic.

== Reception ==
Reception

Aggregate score
Aggregator	Score
Metacritic	57/100

Review scores
Publication	Score
IGN	5.1/10
Official Xbox Magazine (US)	8/10
TeamXbox	48/100

Blazing Birds was met with mixed reviews from critics. Some critics praised the game's simple controls and fast-paced gameplay, while others criticized the game's lack of features and repetitive gameplay.

Blazing Birds received "mixed or average" reviews according to review aggregator Metacritic.

TeamXbox stated, "Our main gripe is that Blazing Birds is just so…flat."

Daemon Hatfield for IGN rated the game 5.1/10, stating "If there was some compelling gameplay here the visuals would be easier to overlook, but this is a pretty simple badminton game with power-ups added. The lack of online play is also disappointing. You'll have more fun slapping your own 'cock around."
