= Beat Hazard =

2009 video game

- Developer: Cold Beam Games
- Publisher: Cold Beam Games
- Platforms: Microsoft Windows, Xbox 360, PlayStation 3, iOS, Android, Linux
- Release: October 28, 2009: Xbox 360; October 28, 2009; July 30, 2013 (Ultra); Microsoft Windows; April 15, 2010; PlayStation 3; October 18, 2011; iOS; February 9, 2012; Android; November 16, 2012
- Genre: Rhythm game
- Mode: Single-player

Beat Hazard is a music-themed video game developed and published by British studio Cold Beam Games on October 28, 2009 for Xbox Live Indie Games.

== Gameplay ==
Beat Hazard is a shoot 'em up where the player controls a small spaceship that must fend off waves of hostile ships and asteroids that spawns around randomly. Destroying ships and asteroids will earn points and sometimes spawn power-ups that can be collected to increase the score multiplier and boost the FX and Sound of the music that is playing. During gameplay, larger enemies known as bosses will occasionally appear. Destroying bosses rewards more points and causes multiple power-ups to appear.

During each music sequence, the main goal is to earn as many points before the song that is playing in the background ends. When the song is finished, a screen then shows how many points was earned and is used as experience to move up ranks. When the player ranks up, a variety of gameplay options can be unlocked, including harder difficulty options and starting with a higher multiplier.

If the player's ship is hit by any enemy projectiles or collides into each other, the ship will be destroyed and a life is deducted. It also causes some of the FX and Sound power-ups to be dropped in the process. If all lives are lost, the music sequence immediately ends, but any points earned will not be lost.

As an important element in Beat Hazard, music affects gameplay in many ways. Enemies spawn in with each beat of the song and the background effects are determined by the sound volumes. Custom soundtracks can also be used, allowing more gameplay opportunities like playing to a song with faster beats that causes enemies to spawn in more frequently.

== Development ==
After being made redundant at his previous employer, director Steve Hunt chose to go indie instead of work for another company. He conceived Beat Hazard because of his interest in music visualizers, leading him to turn the idea into a video game. He was further influenced by the music video game Audiosurf.

A demo of the game was produced over the span of a few days.

== Release ==
Hunt attempted to submit Beat Hazard to Xbox Live Arcade to have the game featured on the Xbox 360, but it was rejected twice.

=== Beat Hazard Ultra ===
An enhanced edition of Beat Hazard was later released for Microsoft Windows, iOS, Android and the PlayStation 3. The Xbox 360 version of the game was re-released under this edition afterwards. This edition added more features, including new weapon power-ups such as missiles and a perk system. It also introduced money that can spawn by destroying enemies and bosses. Money is used to buy and upgrade perks once they're unlocked after ranking up.

=== Shadow Operations ===
In April 2014, the Shadow Operations DLC was released exclusively for the Steam version of the game. It added nine new ships to the game, each with new levels and scoreboards. It also added Steam Workshop support, allowing the creation of custom ships to be created and shared online.

== Reception ==
Reception

Aggregate score
Aggregator	Score		
Aggregator	iOS	PC	PS3
Metacritic	91/100	70/100	63/100

Review scores
Publication	Score		
Publication	iOS	PC	PS3
Destructoid			8.5/10
Eurogamer		6/10	
GameSpot		7/10	
IGN		7.6/10	5/10
Pocket Gamer	4/5		
Push Square			5/10
TouchArcade	4.5/5		

The PC version of Beat Hazard has a rating of 70/100 on Metacritic based on 11 critic reviews. The PlayStation 3 version of Beat Hazard Ultra has a Metacritic rating of 63/100 based on 7 critic reviews, while the iOS version has a rating of 91/100 based on 6 critic reviews.

== Sequels ==
Beat Hazard 2 was released in October 2019. Compared to the original game, the sequel has upgraded graphics and the ability to play music from streaming services in an "Open Mic" mode.

A second sequel, Beat Hazard 3, was released in June 2024 and features an explorable galaxy mapped by music.
