= Microsoft XNA Game Studio =

Integrated development environment

XNA Game Studio
- XNA Logo; The orange dashed line cutting through the 'X' represents X in Morse code
- Developer: Microsoft
- Stable release: 4.0 Refresh / October 6, 2011; 14 years ago
- Platform: Microsoft Windows
- Type: Application framework, integrated development environment
- License: Freeware
- Website: msdn.microsoft.com/en-us/library/ff576659.aspx

Microsoft XNA Game Studio is a discontinued integrated development environment (IDE) for building video games on the Microsoft XNA platform. Such video games can run on Xbox 360, Microsoft Windows, Windows Phone and the Zune. XNA Game Studio is targeted at hobbyists and experienced programmers, and is primarily used to develop 2D and 3D video games for various Microsoft platforms. XNA games can be published for the Xbox 360 using an XNA Creator's Club membership, that has a yearly fee.

Five versions have been released so far, and in 2013, Microsoft stated that it would cease support for XNA in April 2014, and there are no plans to release any further versions. An open-source spiritual successor / API re-implementation exists in the form of the MonoGame framework.

== Versions ==
=== XNA Game Studio Express ===
XNA Game Studio Express, the first release of XNA Game Studio, was intended for students, hobbyists, and independent (and homebrew) game developers. It was available as a free download. Express provides basic "starter kits" for rapid development of specific genres of games, such as platform games, real-time strategy, and first-person shooters. Developers could create Windows games for free with the XNA Framework, but to run their games on the Xbox 360 they will have to pay an annual fee of US$99 (or a four-month fee of US$49) for admission to the Microsoft XNA Creator's Club. The initial release had no way of shipping precompiled binaries to other Xbox 360 players, but this was changed in "XNA Game Studio Express 1.0 Refresh" which made it possible to compile Xbox 360 binaries and share them with other Microsoft XNA Creator's Club members.

The first beta version of XNA Game Studio Express was released for download on August 28, 2006, followed by a second version on November 1, 2006. Microsoft released the final version on December 11, 2006.

On April 24, 2007, Microsoft released an update called XNA Game Studio Express 1.0 Refresh.

=== XNA Game Studio 2.0 ===
XNA Game Studio 2.0 was released on December 13, 2007. XNA Game Studio 2.0 features the ability to be used with all versions of Visual Studio 2005 (including the free Visual C# 2005 Express Edition), a networking API using Xbox Live on both Windows and Xbox 360 and better device handling.

=== XNA Game Studio 3.0 ===
XNA Game Studio 3.0 (for Visual Studio 2008 or the free Visual C# 2008 Express Edition) allows production of games targeting the Zune platform and adds Xbox Live community support. A beta of the toolset was released in September 2008. The final release was released on October 30, 2008. XNA Game Studio 3.0 now supports C# 3.0, LINQ and most versions of Visual Studio 2008. There are several more new features of XNA Game Studio 3.0 also, such as a trial Mode added to XNA Game Studio 3.0 that will enable creators to easily add the required trial feature to their games, Xbox LIVE multi-player features like in-game invites, create cross-platform games that work on Windows, Xbox 360 and Zune.

=== XNA Game Studio 3.1 ===
XNA Game Studio 3.1 was released on June 11, 2009. The API includes support for video playback, a revised audio API, Xbox LIVE Party system and support for games to use the Xbox 360 Avatars.

=== XNA Game Studio 4.0 ===
XNA Game Studio 4.0 was announced and initially released as a "Community Technical Preview" at Game Developers Conference (GDC) on March 9, 2010, and in its final form on September 16, 2010. It adds support for the Windows Phone platform (including 3D hardware acceleration), framework hardware profiles, configurable effects, built-in state objects, graphics device scalars and orientation, cross-platform and multi-touch input, microphone input and buffered audio playback, and Visual Studio 2010 integration.

XNA "Game Studio 4.0 Refresh" was released on 6 October 2011. This added support for Windows Phone 7.5 (Mango), support for Visual Basic, and also bug fixes.

== See also ==
- GameMaker
- Adobe Flash Professional
- Haxe
