= The Dishwasher: Vampire Smile =

2011 video game

- Developer: Ska Studios
- Publishers: Microsoft Game Studios (X360); Ska Studios (PC)
- Designer: James Silva
- Series: The Dishwasher
- Engine: Microsoft XNA
- Platforms: Xbox 360 (XBLA); Microsoft Windows; Linux macOS
- Release: Xbox 360; April 6, 2011; Windows, Linux, macOS; May 12, 2017
- Genres: Side-scroller, beat 'em up, hack and slash
- Modes: Single-player, Multiplayer

The Dishwasher: Vampire Smile is a 2D side-scrolling beat 'em up video game. It was developed by Ska Studios and released for the Xbox 360 via XBLA on April 6, 2011, and for the Microsoft Windows, Linux and macOS on May 12, 2017. It is the sequel to The Dishwasher: Dead Samurai, released in 2009. Players assume the roles of The Dishwasher and his stepsister Yuki, in two separate solo campaigns, as they battle through legions of enemies and try to unravel the secrets of their pasts. The main story revolves around The Dishwasher's quest for universal freedom and Yuki's quest for revenge against the three marks of power that robbed her of her life.

== Plot ==
The game begins with a playable flashback segment of the first game where the player leads The Dishwasher through the Grace Chapel, building up to the boss fight against Yuki. The Dishwasher emerges victorious from this battle and Yuki dies in his hands.

It is revealed that after the events of the first game, The Dishwasher and Chef destroyed the world after it became uninhabitable. This crime was pinned on Yuki however, who was witnessed escaping the scene, having mysteriously been reanimated. During her time in the Iffenhaus prison ship she experiences recurring nightmares caused by an entity known as The Creeper, and wakes up to the image of her slaughtering a prison guard. With her newfound powers she breaks out of the prison and stows herself away in an escape pod shortly after getting her arm cut off in battle.

She crashes onto the Moon and wakes up, only to find herself with a chainsaw implant where her arm used to be. She then and there decides to pursue a quest for revenge against the three figures of power known as The Banker, General and Judge, all of whom were responsible for her incarceration. During this time The Dishwasher who has relocated himself to the moon finds himself searching for the heart of the new Cyborg movement, following Yuki's blood trail of revenge. The game is broken up into two solo campaigns that largely run in tandem with each other. They break off midway into separate stories once the two protagonists meet each other for the first time, however.

In Yuki's storyline, she finds herself in another hallucination where she finds a knife and uses it to kill who she believes is her manipulator, The Creeper. However she regains conscious and finds out that she inadvertently has stabbed The Dishwasher with it. Yuki becomes distressed but is reassured by him that he's okay with it, as it's only fair she repays him the favor for having killed her once. The Dishwasher rips the knife out of his body and dies. The Creeper then appears before Yuki and is killed by her in a fit of rage and hate. Chef then arrives to the scene, explaining to her that killing The Dishwasher shouldn't be possible as the Chef, Dishwasher and Yuki all share the same inhuman blood that makes them unkillable through normal means. He tells Yuki that the knife she extracted from her nightmares should be taken back and used to murder her inner demon who is driving her to the brink of insanity. Yuki succeeds, and proceeds to kill her final mark, the Judge, who has become a symbiont for The Fallen Engineer. In the end after facing the fact that the world is still in chaos and that her stepbrother is dead, her only care in the world is that she's finally free.

In The Dishwasher's storyline, Chef confronts him, explaining to him that Yuki is being manipulated by The Creeper, who must die if Yuki is to have her freedom. The Dishwasher finds Yuki being manipulated by The Creeper, but quickly kills The Creeper so as to not having to resort to killing Yuki again. Yuki regains conscious and finds The Dishwasher standing over The Creeper's dead body. The two then reconcile, however Yuki remains convinced that her mission for revenge is one that she must carry out alone. The Dishwasher leaves her to her mission, as he continues his search for the source of Cyborgs. He eventually reaches the Judge's tower where Yuki prepares to exact her revenge, however through an accursed mask the Judge manages to act as a symbiont for The Fallen Engineer, the true antagonist of the plot, and he partakes with The Dishwasher and Yuki in a battle. The Engineer manages to enter the depths of The Dishwasher's stagnant nightmare and tries to kill him from the inside. The Dishwasher overpowers him however, and ultimately kills him.

== Gameplay ==
Gameplay remains largely similar to that of its predecessor. The game is a side-scrolling beat 'em up where the player must violently dispense of enemies with the help of numerous weapons. Recurring elements from the original include Dish Magic and Shop Bots where one can buy upgrades and items with money received through defeating enemies. The biggest addition is a new playable character, Yuki, who controls differently from The Dishwasher in combat. Co-op has also been fully integrated into the story-mode allowing for an exclusive campaign. There are five new weapons in the game, including a large syringe dubbed The Painkiller and an oversized pair of scissors titled The Guillotine. Combat revisions have been made: now the player can stock up to four weapons at once with the help of two sets of load outs that can be interchanged at all times. Guns are now automatically mapped to function on the right trigger, and normal enemies no longer have exclusive executions as they are all down to weaponry. A new gameplay feature is the addition of collectible Beads that can be equipped to give various status effects such as improved strength against specific enemies or attacks draining health. The guitar minigame also makes a return; however, the Psycho Picks that were granted in the original game for finishing them do not.

== Development and release ==
The game was showcased at the PAX East 2010 convention.

== Reception ==
Reception

Aggregate score
Aggregator	Score
Metacritic	81/100

Review scores
Publication	Score
The A.V. Club	B+
Destructoid	6.5/10
Edge	7/10
Eurogamer	6/10
Game Informer	8.5/10
GameSpot	9/10
GameTrailers	8.5/10
IGN	7.5/10
Joystiq	4.5/5
Official Xbox Magazine (US)	9/10
411Mania	8.2/10

The Xbox 360 version received "favorable" reviews according to the review aggregation website Metacritic. GameSpot's Kevin VanOrd said that the game was "grimly gorgeous and violently entertaining" and went on to say that it "is one of the finest games released so far this year." Destructoid, by contrast, praised the game's goofy violence, character design, bleak aesthetic, and tightly-designed combat while criticizing its convoluted story and inability to engage the player to the end. Game Informer recommended the game, writing, "[The Dishwasher: Vampire Smile's] grim style is accompanied by some of the tightest 2D action around. While the challenge and dark subject matter could be a turn-off for some, most players will find a deep and rewarding action title that is more than worth a download." IGN said, "This is a refined version of the first title, with better dodging, more varied and entertaining enemies, and the same over-the-top violence...The repetitive level design can become mind-numbing in any sort of prolonged session, but the excellent combat is enough to make it worth playing..." VideoGamer.com commended its intense combat but took issue with its fiddly controls and punishing difficulty.
