= Cloudberry Kingdom =

2013 platforming video game

- Developer: Pwnee Studios
- Publishers: Ubisoft; RedoApps Limited (PS4, PS5, Nintendo Switch)
- Platforms: Microsoft Windows, PlayStation 3, PlayStation 4, PlayStation 5, Wii U, Nintendo Switch, Xbox 360
- Release: PlayStation 3: NA: July 30, 2013; PAL: July 31, 2013; Xbox 360; July 31, 2013; Wii U August 1, 2013; Windows; August 2, 2013; PlayStation 5, PlayStation 4 December 12, 2025; Nintendo Switch; February 2, 2026
- Genre: Platform
- Modes: Single-player, multiplayer

Cloudberry Kingdom is a platform game created by Pwnee Studios. The game uses a set of algorithms developed by Jordan Fisher to create procedurally generated levels that can be adaptive to player skill level, player character abilities, and alteration of game physics. It was crowdfunded via Kickstarter.

Cloudberry Kingdom is a downloadable title for Microsoft Windows, PlayStation 3, Wii U and Xbox 360.

On December 12, 2025, RedoApps has rereleased Cloudberry Kingdom on PlayStation 4 and PlayStation 5, with a Nintendo Switch version released on February 2, 2026. The PlayStation 5 can also play the PlayStation 3 version via emulation, making it the first PS3 title to be backwards compatible with PS5.

== Reception ==
Reception

Aggregate score
Aggregator	Score
Metacritic	(PS3, Wii U) 75/100 (X360) 68/100 (PC) 67/100

Review scores
Publication	Score
Destructoid	(PS3) 6/10
Edge	(X360) 5/10
GameRevolution	(PS3) 6/10
GameSpot	(X360) 8.5/10
GameZone	7.5/10
Hardcore Gamer	(X360) 3.5/5
IGN	(PS3) 7.4/10
Nintendo Life	(Wii U) 8/10
Nintendo World Report	(Wii U) 8/10
Official Nintendo Magazine	(Wii U) 80%
PlayStation Official Magazine – UK	(PS3) 7/10
Official Xbox Magazine (US)	(X360) 6/10
PC Gamer (UK)	(PC) 60%
Push Square	(PS3) 8/10
Digital Spy	(X360) 2/5
Metro	(X360) 7/10

The PlayStation 3 and Wii U versions received "generally favorable reviews", while the Xbox 360 and PC versions received "average" reviews, according to the review aggregation website Metacritic.

== Delisting ==
In May 2020, the game's publisher, Ubisoft, delisted Cloudberry Kingdom on Steam with no announcement. Neither Pwnee Studios nor Ubisoft commented on the delisting, though ComicBook.com speculates that Ubisoft has lost the publishing rights to the game.
