= Instruments of Destruction =

2024 video game

- Developer: Radiangames
- Publishers: Radiangames; Secret Mode (PS5, Xbox)
- Designer: Luke Schneider
- Platforms: Windows, PlayStation 5, Xbox Series X/S
- Release: Windows; May 10, 2024; PS5, Xbox Series X/S; October 23, 2025
- Genre: Simulation
- Mode: Single-player

Instruments of Destruction is a 2024 simulation video game developed and published by Radiangames for Windows. Ports for the PlayStation 5 and Xbox Series X/S were released on October 23, 2025.

== Gameplay ==
A main campaign mode consisting of more than 50 missions was added to the 1.0 version. It tasks the player to demolish structures using a selection of over 100 pre-designed vehicles. There's an additional 25 mission campaign where the player designs their own vehicles. A sandbox mode that has no objectives is also included. The designer drew inspiration for the primary campaign mode from the 1997 game Blast Corps.

== Release ==
Radiangames is a one-person developer based in Illinois, U.S. It is headed by Luke Schneider, previously known for being the lead tech designer on Red Faction: Guerrilla, another physics-based destruction game. The game was announced in April 2021 for an early access release in the fourth quarter of 2021. It was released in early access eventually on March 2, 2022. The game was released out of early access on May 10, 2024. Console versions are planned for later in 2024.

== Reception ==
Early access

NME said the "destruction system is both spectacular and wonderfully intricate" but had mixed comparisons to Besiege. Eurogamer said the vehicle editor is easy and fun to use and the game surpasses being merely a imitator of Besiege. GameStar noted the destruction physics as superior to that of Besiege. They also noted the "unexpectedly cool soundtrack". They later included the game on a list of best physics games on Steam. After playing the early access version, TJ Denzer of Shacknews said his time with the game "has been an absolute blast".

Full release

PC Gamer described the destruction tech as beautiful and the game itself as a joy to play.
