= Weapon of Choice (video game) =

2008 video game

- Developer: Mommy's Best Games
- Publisher: Mommy's Best Games
- Designers: Nathan Fouts; Jack Mayer
- Programmer: Nathan Fouts
- Artists: Nathan Fouts; Brian Lawver
- Writer: AJ Johnson
- Composer: Hamdija Ajanovic
- Platforms: Xbox 360; Windows; Weapon of Choice DX; PlayStation 4; Xbox One; Nintendo Switch
- Release: Xbox 360; November 19, 2008; Windows; September 23, 2015; PS4, Xbox One, Switch; September 2, 2021
- Genre: Run and gun
- Mode: Single-player

Weapon of Choice is a run and gun video game developed by independent studio Mommy's Best Games and released on November 19, 2008.

== Gameplay ==
In the game, the player can select between seven "operatives", which are the characters controlled throughout the playthrough. The skills vary depending on the character chosen to play.

== Development ==
Weapon of Choice was developed by Nathan Fouts, who previously was with Insomniac Games. The composer was Hamdija Ajanovic and the writer was AJ Johnson. The game was developed during the period of one year.

== Reception ==
Christopher Troilo from Avault gave the game three stars out of five, stating that "If you require something with a little more depth and thought, I still think you should give it a try, but that’s probably all you’ll need to satisfy your curiosity". Kieron Gillen from Eurogamer gave it a score of 7 out of 10, complimenting the graphic style as "hyperactive amateurish-yet-charming" and stating that it was "a run-and-gun that chooses to step back from the difficulty cliff and just show all the gleeful nonsense its managed to think up." Both reviewers compared the game to Contra. Brad Gallaway of GameCritic's praised the game saying its "a clear love of the genre it builds upon".
