= The Dishwasher: Dead Samurai =

2009 video game

- Developer: Ska Studios
- Publisher: Microsoft Game Studios
- Designer: James Silva
- Engine: Microsoft XNA
- Platform: Xbox 360 (XBLA) Microsoft Windows
- Release: Xbox 360; April 1, 2009 Microsoft Windows: TBA
- Genres: Side-scroller, beat 'em up, hack and slash
- Modes: Single-player, Multiplayer

The Dishwasher: Dead Samurai is a beat 'em up game developed by independent software developer James Silva for the Xbox 360's Xbox Live Arcade service. A Windows port was announced, but a release date on Steam has not yet been set.

== Gameplay ==
Gameplay revolves around an unnamed protagonist, ostensibly a dishwasher, as he fights through waves of increasingly stronger enemies until the boss fight and the end of the level. The player is given a basic starting weapon (meat cleavers) and can earn new weapons and upgrades by defeating bosses and collecting "spirals" from defeated enemies. Weapons include the cleavers, a katana, an Uzi/shotgun combo, chainsaw, and kama. Fighting is done through using either a basic attack, a strong attack, or a grab move, in combination or alone to string together chains of attacks for points. Enemies, once weakened, are susceptible to various "finishing moves" that yield even more points and health to the player. There is also a magic system, dubbed "Dish Magic", which can be bought at later levels. Also present is a guitar minigame, which can be played with the common guitar peripherals from the Guitar Hero and Rock Band series.

== Characters ==
- The Dishwasher: The hyperviolent, unnamed protagonist; killed by the Cyborgs in hopes of making him one of their own, the Dishwasher was saved by Chef—his mentor—who infused him with Alien Blood, resurrecting him and giving him incredible powers. The Dishwasher has flashbacks through a series of comic-strips about his life and hatred for the Cyborgs and their master "Synthesis AI" but more importantly of his sister, Yuki, who gave herself willingly to the Cyborgs. His quest is simple: destroy the head of the Cyborg army so that the world may be saved. The Dishwasher has long black hair that covers the bulk of his face, and he is naked save for a torn garment that covers his lower body.
- Synthesis AI: The Master Computer created by the Fallen Engineer that rules the Cyborg army; destroying Synthesis is the Dishwasher's primary goal for it is the controller of the Cyborgs. It has the several television screens that appear as its many faces and two robotic arms that it uses to control the other computers with. Upon defeat, The Dishwasher smashes the largest television screen thus ending The Cyborg's tyrannical reign.
- Chef: The Dishwasher's mentor and savior. Chef is a mysterious character whose past is ambiguous, however we learn that it was Chef who saved the Dishwasher from the Cyborg army and indeed he is the only one who can stop the Fallen Engineer (the Engineer says this himself at the end of the game). It appears that Chef's powers are superior even to the Dishwasher himself, for example at one point during the game: Chef is cut in two by a Cyborg yet somehow manages to come back to life. He assists the Dishwasher at times during the game combating enemies and appears once again in the final battle against the Fallen Engineer. He is presented in a stereotypical French-Chef attire, he has a short beard and squinting eyes; Chef fights with a meat cleaver and throwing kitchen knives.
- The Fallen Engineer: Chef's nemesis and the silent antagonist of the game. The Fallen Engineer is encountered twice: once in the very beginning and once at the very end as the final boss of the game. We learn that the Fallen Engineer is actually the original creator of Synthesis AI and the Cyborg Army. From his speech it seems that he and Chef have fought on several occasions and he believes Chef to be the only one powerful enough to stop him. When first encountered, the Fallen Engineer rides a Cyborg Stallion and wields the "Shift Blade" (which is adopted by the player upon defeat). When encountered in the end, the Fallen Engineer wields the plucked electrical cords of Synthesis AI. The Dishwasher hacks both his arms off and decapitates him, only for his enemy to resurrect himself. When finally defeated, the Engineer's head erupts in a shower of blood and his body ignites. He is presented in a long, black cloak with a grinning white, doll-like mask.
- Yuki: The Dishwasher's prodigal sister whom he lost to the Cyborgs years before. He often reminisces of his sister but thinks she is dead. Whilst pursuing Synthesis, the Dishwasher is accosted by a masked assassin in Grace Chapel: the Dishwasher quickly disposes of his enemy only for the assassin's hood to fall and reveal the face of his sister. She thanks him with her dying breath for "saving her". Distraught at her death, the Dishwasher's hatred grows ever stronger.
- The Doctor: Synthesis AIs' most loyal servant is the Doctor: a psychopathic Cyborg who is responsible for the process that is used to turn humans into machines. He recognizes the Dishwasher instantly upon confrontation and claims that he is "property"—nothing more. Upon defeat, the Dishwasher cuts the Doctor's head clean in two.

=== Game modes ===
There are two different game modes besides the Story Mode. In Dish Challenge the player must survive wave after wave of enemy attacks while attempting to score combos for points. The second extra mode is Arcade, which are short, one room levels which sometimes have certain themes or types on their own. The player is locked in with two weapons and one magic ability, and must kill all enemies. In addition to the standard Story Mode, there is a ranked mode that is set at the hardest difficulty, and up to 3 extra players in co-op mode which can play through the whole story (non-ranked only).

== Development ==
The Dishwasher: Dead Samurai gameplay screenshot

Inspiration for The Dishwasher began in 2004 when James Silva was working as a dishwasher, and felt that the position earned too little respect. After pointing out to many people that Bruce Lee was a dishwasher, he began to envision a game about a dishwasher who "mercilessly slaughtered piles of extremely well trained evil minions". Several attempts were made on the game, with the first idea as a third-person shooter. This was later scrapped for a side-scrolling shooter, then a 3D side-scroller. Silva eventually settled on the current 2D design after working with XNA Game Studio Express. Work on the game proceeded for about four months before the eventual submission to Dream.Build.Play, and in the end had numerous levels, weapons, bosses, and thousands of frames of animation.

The Dishwasher was the winner of Microsoft's initial Dream-Build-Play game development contest in 2007. Silva received US$10,000 and an Xbox Live Arcade publishing contract.

== Reception ==
Reception

Aggregate score
Aggregator	Score
Metacritic	75/100

Review scores
Publication	Score
Destructoid	8/10
Edge	8/10
Eurogamer	8/10
GamePro	3.75/5
GameRevolution	C+
GamesMaster	84%
GameSpot	7.5/10
IGN	7.3/10
Official Xbox Magazine (US)	8/10
TeamXbox	8.8/10
Teletext GameCentral	3/10

The Dishwasher received "generally favorable reviews" according to the review aggregation website Metacritic.

Destructoid praised its art style, combat, character design, enemy variety, and amount of content while criticizing its dramatic writing and difficult learning curve. Eurogamer heavily praised the game's visuals, writing, "Indeed, The Dishwasher is deceptively pretty - all sketchbook-and-crayons layered with smudgy atmosphere, caught in a deathly limbo somewhere between Ōkami, Castlevania, and Alien Hominid, while finding fault with overly precise controls and frustrating bosses." GameSpot, GamesRadar+, and IGN similarly commended the unique art design, challenging gameplay, and tight controls, while taking minor issue with the sometimes punishing difficulty and its inability to remain engaging until the end. Official Xbox Magazine gave the game a favorable review, a few months before it was released worldwide.

== Sequel ==
A sequel, The Dishwasher: Vampire Smile, was released in April 2011.
