= Xbox Live Indie Games =

Video games program by Microsoft

The splash screen used at the beginning of every Xbox Live Indie Game

Xbox Live Indie Games (previously called Xbox Live Community Games) were video games created by individual developers or small teams of developers released on Microsoft's Xbox Live Marketplace for the Xbox 360. The games were developed using Microsoft XNA, and developed by one or more independent developers that are registered with App Hub. Unlike Xbox Live Arcade titles, these were generally only tested within the local creator community, had much lower costs of production, and generally were less expensive to purchase.

The service was released to widespread use alongside the New Xbox Experience, and as of November 2014, over 3,300 games had been released on the service, many receiving media attention. All Indie Games currently require the user to be logged into their Xbox Live account to initiate the start-up of each game. Indie Games were not available in Australia due to local classification requirements which were unable to be fulfilled, though there were workarounds which allowed Australian users to download them regardless. The Xbox Live Indie Games program did not continue with the release of the Xbox One, and the marketplace for these games was shuttered on October 7, 2017.

== History ==
Initial tools for the development of games on the Xbox 360 platform were bundled in the XNA Game Studio Express 1.0, released in December 2006, as a means of introducing newer programmers to the steps in game programming. Additional releases of the XNA Game Studio added further features with the core software libraries, but the created games were limited to the developer's own console unit and could not be shared with others. During the Game Developers Conference in February 2008, Microsoft announced that it would be bringing the Xbox Live Community Games service to Marketplace, allowing these games to be shared with others. According to Microsoft's David Edery, portfolio planner for Xbox Live Arcade's, the company envisioned the Community Games as a way for programmers to bring niche experimental games to wider attention without justifying the cost of a full Arcade title with only a limited audience, while still potentially earning some money for the effort. Edery also cited the Community Games as a potential differentiator from either of the PlayStation Store and WiiWare services.

A closed beta of Community Games was introduced on May 21, 2008, limited to Premium members of the XNA Creators' Club. Community Games were introduced with the New Xbox Experience on November 19, 2008. Upon the release of XNA 3.1, Microsoft changed the games to "Xbox Live Indie Games" with hopes that it will help increase the "understanding and discoverability" of user-created games. After the fourth quarter Dashboard update in 2010, the Indie Games tab on the Marketplace was moved to the "Specialty Shops" section of the dashboard, away from where regular Xbox Live Arcade titles would be shown. Independent developers that published through the Indie Game service were concerned that this move reduced the visibility of the games, leading to lower sales and fewer incentives to develop for the series. Microsoft stated that the move was designed to benefit independent game developers, highlighting such games through the Specialty Shop tab. However within a week, Microsoft quietly reverted this change, moving the Indie Games tab back to the main "Game Marketplace" section. The most successful game on XBLIG is DigitalDNA Games' CastleMiner Z, which was the first title on the service to reach one million paid downloads.

=== Availability in Australia ===
Indie Games were not available in Australia, due to the requirement for all games to be rated by the Australian Classification Board, and the prohibitive expenses involved. It was possible, however, to bypass this restriction and download Indie Games in Australia by either changing one's Microsoft account locale to another country (though this would require payment for the Indie Games in that locale's currency instead of Australian currency) or downloading the profile of an account that had already purchased one or more Indie Games, using that profile to download the game(s) again, then transferring the game licenses to the Xbox 360 console that was intended to be played on, which then allowed all profiles downloaded to that specific console (whether on the Australian locale or otherwise) to play those games.

== Game development ==
Xbox Live Indie Games were developed under certain distribution restrictions:

- The binary distribution package must be no larger than 500 MB, upgraded from the original 150 MB, as of January 4, 2012.
- The games are priced at 80, 240, or 400 Microsoft Points (approximately US$1, $3, and $5, respectively). Games larger than 150 MB (previously larger than 50 MB) must be priced at least 240 Microsoft Points as of the January 4, 2012 update. Prior to the August 2009 update, the pricing structure was set at 200, 400, or 800 Microsoft Points (approximately US$2.50, $5, and $10, respectively).
- An eight-minute trial period is enforced for Indie Games, after which, if the player has not yet purchased the game, the game will end and inform them they need to purchase the full version to keep playing. The developers have no control over this trial period. This limit was initially four minutes but feedback from players and developers extended the trial period.
- XBLIG titles lack some of the features found in XBLA games. XBLIG games do not have achievements or leaderboards, nor are they listed on a player's "Gamer Card". However, such games can be integrated with other parts of the Xbox Live Experience, including using multiplayer support, game invitations, and game information on friend lists. XNA also includes support for party chat and Xbox Live Avatars.
- XBLIG developers were only allowed to publish up to eight titles, but as of January 4, 2012, the limit has been raised to twenty.

Indie Games were created and added to the Xbox Live service by a four-step process:

- Create – Games are written in C# or Visual Basic .NET using the XNA Game Studio framework, allowing the developers to debug and test their game internally before release. The final code is compiled into a single binary package.
- Submission – The developer uploads their binary to the App Hub website, during which they can specify metadata for the game such as the target region for release, the cost they wish to offer the game, media for the game that can be displayed in the Marketplace screens, and suggested content ratings for the game.
- Playtest – Initially not part of the beta program for Indie Games, the playtest phase allows for developers to allow the game to be played by Premium members of the App Hub for a week, giving them feedback which they can use to revise their submissions prior to the peer review process.
- Peer Review – Indie Games must undergo peer review before they are released to the service. These are performed by other developers on the Indie Games service, who review the game for unacceptable content, game instability, and other factors that would be detrimental for wide release on the service, though these reviewers do not attempt to qualify the quality of the game itself. Reviewers also provided suggested content ratings for the games, similar to the submission phase. Games require multiple trusted reviews before they are released. Rejected games can be resubmitted using feedback provided by the reviewers. When the program moved out of beta phase, which was limited to the United States, and into wide distribution, covering both North America and Western Europe, the peer review process was amended to include additional review for games that support multiple languages.
- Release – Games that pass the Peer Review are released onto the service. Developers receive 70% of sales of the game, with Microsoft retaining the right to an additional 10–30% of the sales if they have decided to market the game further. However, until they have worked out how to factor in the benefits of the marketing efforts, Microsoft has promised to maintain the 70/30 split for all games.

With an August 11, 2009, update to the Xbox Live system, Xbox Live Indie Games supported user ratings, a feature which was also applied to other content in the Xbox Live Marketplace.

Most XBLIG games had been developed by students or hobbyist developers, who have invested a minimal amount of money, including the yearly fee for the App Hub membership, to develop their games. However, at least one game has incurred much larger development costs: Biology Battle by Novaleaf, developed by Novaleaf Software, took eleven months to complete the game with development costs just under $100,000. The game was originally planned as a standard Xbox Live Arcade title, but was rejected by Microsoft about seven months into the project; Novaleaf decided to press forward and release the game as an Indie Game. Another game, Techno Kitten Adventure, was developed by a smaller developer, XMONOX, who then partnered with design studio Elite Gudz to relaunch the game with gameplay improvements and ports to mobile devices.

While distributing for XBLIG was relatively easy, games on the platform often made very small earnings, compared to other platforms, prompting many indie developers to move on from the Xbox 360 platform. Zeboyd Games, who developed Breath of Death VII and Cthulhu Saves the World for XBLIG, ported the games to Microsoft Windows about a year and a half later; within six days of their release on the Steam platform, the Windows-version sales, roughly $100,000, had surpassed the previous year-and-a-half sales from XBLIG.

== Promotions ==
Developers had come together to promote Xbox Live Indie Games with community driven promotions featuring select games, called the Indie Games Uprising. There had been four "uprisings", the "Indie Games Winter Uprising", which took place during December 2010, and the "Indie Games Summer Uprising" which took place during August 2011, and the "Indie Games Uprising III" which took place during September 2012. On September 28, 2015, the Uprising returned with a tribute page showcasing developers that got their start on XBLIG and are now working on projects for Xbox One, PlayStation 4 and Wii U thanks to the platform.

== End of service ==
As Microsoft transitioned from the Xbox 360 to the Xbox One, the Xbox Live Indie Games program was not brought over to the new platform. The XNA software was discontinued in 2013, and in September 2015, Microsoft emailed developers outlining the end-of-life of the Xbox Live Indie Games program. The Indie Games Marketplace was originally scheduled to be shuttered on September 29, 2017; users that had already purchased these games could continue to play and download the titles. However, due to player demand, Microsoft extended the shutdown date until October 7. Microsoft has stated they are interested in helping to bring more successful titles from the program into their Xbox Live Creators Program, part of their ID@Xbox indie game initiative, to help preserve these titles.

== Notable games ==
- Apple Jack
- Biology Battle
- Blocks That Matter
- CarneyVale: Showtime
- CastleMiner
- Flotilla
- FortressCraft
- I MAED A GAM3 W1TH Z0MB1ES 1N IT!!!1
- The Impossible Game
- Kodu Game Lab
- Snops Attack! Zombie Defense
- Solar 2
- Super Amazing Wagon Adventure
- Techno Kitten Adventure
- Total Miner
- Weapon of Choice
