= Sickhead Games =

American video game developer

Sickhead Games, LLC
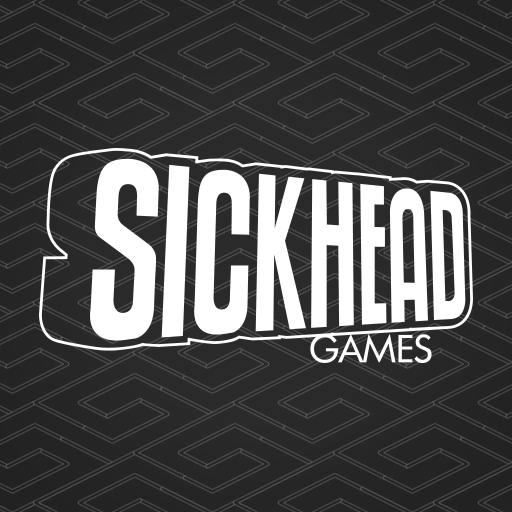
- Type: Limited liability company
- Industry: Video games
- Founded: October 2002; 24 years ago
- Founders: Tom Spilman; Russell Fincher
- Headquarters: Dallas, Texas, U.S.
- Products: ARMED!; Stardew Valley (port); Celeste (port); Slay the Spire (port); Space Invaders Deck Commander
- Number of employees: 5–10
- Website: sickheadgames.com

Sickhead Games, LLC is an American independent video game developer based in Dallas, Texas. It was founded in October 2002 by Tom Spilman and Russell Fincher and specializes in porting, remastering, and co-developing games for consoles and PC, in addition to producing its own original titles. Titles the studio has ported or co-developed include Darkest Dungeon, Stardew Valley, Celeste, and Slay the Spire.

Sickhead's early work centered on the Torque engine before the studio shifted its focus to MonoGame, an open-source framework for which Spilman is a project lead. It released its first original title, ARMED!, in 2013, and the following year began porting console versions of independently developed games, starting with TowerFall Ascension. Since then, the studio has ported dozens of titles to PlayStation, Xbox, Nintendo Switch, and mobile platforms and has produced HD remasters of older games such as Grandia and ExZeus. It released Space Invaders Deck Commander in 2024 and began releasing the Jaleco Sports Series in 2025, a line of revived NES, SNES, and Famicom sports games developed with Jaleco.

== History ==
Sickhead Games was founded in Dallas, Texas, in October 2002 by Tom Spilman and Russell Fincher. In its early years the studio worked with the Torque series of game engines, later shifting its focus to MonoGame, an open-source framework that lowered the barrier for indie developers bringing their games to consoles.

In 2013, the studio released its first original title, ARMED!, a multiplatform turn-based strategy game for mobile devices and Windows. In 2014, Sickhead began porting independently developed games to consoles, starting with the PlayStation 4 version of TowerFall Ascension. Later ports included Octodad: Dadliest Catch for the PlayStation Vita in 2015.

The studio went on to port further indie titles to PlayStation and Xbox One consoles, including Darkest Dungeon, Stardew Valley, Axiom Verge, and Slay the Spire. Support later expanded to Nintendo Switch and mobile platforms.

Alongside its ports of contemporary indie games, Sickhead has produced updated versions of older console and PC games for modern systems, including ExZeus, Enclave, and Grandia. In 2024, the studio released Space Invaders Deck Commander with Rock It Games and Taito. In 2025, it began reviving classic NES, SNES, and Famicom Jaleco sports titles, beginning with Jaleco Sports: Bases Loaded and Jaleco Sports: GOAL! on Windows.

== MonoGame ==
Co-founder Tom Spilman has served as one of the framework's project leads and, as of July 2026, sits on the board of the MonoGame Foundation. After Sony and the MonoGame team connected in 2013, Sickhead was brought on to help move the arena-combat game TowerFall from the Ouya to PlayStation 4 as TowerFall Ascension. That project led to further porting contracts for numerous other MonoGame- and XNA-based indie titles.

== Video games ==
=== Developed games ===
Year	Title	Platform(s)	Publisher
2013	ARMED!	Mobile, Windows	Sickhead Games
2015	Be the Astronaut	Windows	Eureka Exhibits
2015	Be the Dinosaur	Windows	Eureka Exhibits
2018	Floating Log Raft Simulator	Windows	Eureka Exhibits
2024	Space Invaders Deck Commander	PlayStation, Xbox One/X/S, Nintendo Switch, Windows	Rock It Games / Taito
2025	Jaleco Sports Series	Windows, Nintendo Switch, PlayStation 5	Rock It Games / Jaleco

=== Ports and remasters ===
Title	Release date	Platform	Developer / Publisher
TowerFall Ascension	March 11, 2014	PlayStation 4	Maddy Makes Games, Inc, Extremely OK, Ltd
TowerFall Ascension	December 15, 2015	PlayStation Vita	Maddy Makes Games, Inc, Extremely OK, Ltd
TowerFall Ascension	January 24, 2017	Xbox One	Maddy Makes Games, Inc, Extremely OK, Ltd
Dust: An Elysian Tail	October 7, 2014	PlayStation 4	Humble Hearts
Escape Goat 2	October 21, 2014	PlayStation 4	MagicalTimeBean
Ironclad Tactics	January 20, 2015	PlayStation 4	Zachtronics Industries
Apotheon	February 3, 2015	PlayStation 4	Alientrap
TowerFall Dark World Expansion	May 12, 2015	PlayStation 4	Maddy Makes Games, Inc, Extremely OK, Ltd
TowerFall Dark World Expansion	January 25, 2017	Xbox One	Maddy Makes Games, Inc, Extremely OK, Ltd
Octodad: Dadliest Catch	May 26, 2015	PlayStation Vita	Young Horses, Inc
Skulls of the Shogun: Bone-a-Fide Edition	June 2, 2015	PlayStation 4	17-Bit
Skulls of the Shogun: Bone-a-Fide Edition	July 11, 2019	Nintendo Switch	17-Bit
Axiom Verge	April 19, 2016	PlayStation Vita	Thomas Happ Games
Axiom Verge	September 29, 2016	Xbox One	Thomas Happ Games
Axiom Verge	October 5, 2017	Nintendo Switch	Thomas Happ Games
Score Rush Extended	May 31, 2016	PlayStation 4	Xona Games
Darkest Dungeon	September 28, 2016	PlayStation 4	Red Hook Studios
Darkest Dungeon	September 28, 2016	PlayStation Vita	Red Hook Studios
Stardew Valley	July 29, 2016	Mac OS X	ConcernedApe
Stardew Valley	July 29, 2016	Linux	ConcernedApe
Stardew Valley	December 13, 2016	PlayStation 4	ConcernedApe
Stardew Valley	May 22, 2018	PlayStation Vita	ConcernedApe
Stardew Valley	December 13, 2016	Xbox One	ConcernedApe
Stardew Valley	October 5, 2017	Nintendo Switch	ConcernedApe
Stardew Valley	December 25, 2025	Nintendo Switch 2	ConcernedApe
Salt and Sanctuary	March 28, 2017	PlayStation Vita	Ska Studios
CRYPTARK	June 27, 2017	PlayStation 4	Alientrap
Tooth and Tail	September 12, 2017	PlayStation 4	Pocketwatch Games
Celeste	January 25, 2018	PlayStation 4	Maddy Makes Games, Inc, Extremely OK, Ltd
Celeste	January 25, 2018	Xbox One	Maddy Makes Games, Inc, Extremely OK, Ltd
Celeste	January 25, 2018	Nintendo Switch	Maddy Makes Games, Inc, Extremely OK, Ltd
Mercenary Kings: Reloaded	February 6, 2018	Xbox One	Tribute Games
Mercenary Kings: Reloaded	February 6, 2018	PlayStation Vita	Tribute Games
TowerFall	September 27, 2018	Nintendo Switch	Maddy Makes Games
Chasm	July 31, 2018	PlayStation Vita	Bit Kid, Inc.
Chasm	October 11, 2018	Nintendo Switch	Bit Kid, Inc.
Slay the Spire	May 21, 2019	PlayStation 4	MegaCrit / Humble Games
Slay the Spire	June 6, 2019	Nintendo Switch	MegaCrit / Humble Games
Slay the Spire	August 13, 2019	Xbox One	MegaCrit / Humble Games
Slay the Spire	June 13, 2020	iOS	MegaCrit / Humble Games
Slay the Spire	February 3, 2021	Android	MegaCrit / Humble Games
Eagle Island	July 11, 2019	Nintendo Switch	Pixelnicks / Retroware
Grandia HD Collection	August 16, 2019	Nintendo Switch	Game Arts
Grandia HD Collection	March 26, 2024	PlayStation 4	Game Arts
Grandia HD Collection	March 26, 2024	Xbox One	Game Arts
Grandia HD Remaster	October 15, 2019	Windows	Game Arts
Grandia II HD Remaster	October 15, 2019	Windows	Game Arts
Monaco: Complete Edition	October 21, 2019	Nintendo Switch	Pocketwatch Games
Door Kickers: Action Squad	October 23, 2019	Xbox One	KillHouse Games
Door Kickers: Action Squad	October 24, 2019	PlayStation 4	KillHouse Games
Door Kickers: Action Squad	October 28, 2019	Nintendo Switch	KillHouse Games
Real Heroes: Firefighter	November 27, 2019	Nintendo Switch	Epicenter Studios / Golem Entertainment
Real Heroes: Firefighter	March 10, 2020	PlayStation 4	Epicenter Studios / 612 Entertainment, LLC
Real Heroes: Firefighter	March 30, 2022	Xbox One	Epicenter Studios / Ziggurat Interactive
Ikenfell	October 8, 2020	Xbox One	Happy Ray Games / Humble Games
Ikenfell	October 8, 2020	PlayStation 4	Happy Ray Games / Humble Games
Ikenfell	October 8, 2020	Nintendo Switch	Happy Ray Games / Humble Games
Unrailed!	September 23, 2020	Xbox One	Indoor Astronaut / Daedalic Entertainment
Unrailed!	September 23, 2020	PlayStation 4	Indoor Astronaut / Daedalic Entertainment
Wildfire	December 3, 2020	Xbox One	Sneaky Bastards / Humble Games
Wildfire	December 3, 2020	PlayStation 4	Sneaky Bastards / Humble Games
Wildfire	December 3, 2020	Nintendo Switch	Sneaky Bastards / Humble Games
Mundaun	March 15, 2021	Xbox One	MWM Interactive
Mundaun	March 15, 2021	PlayStation 4	MWM Interactive
Heavy Burger	April 27, 2021	PlayStation 4	Lub Blub, International Headquarters / G-MODE, 612 Entertainment
Eagle Island Twist	May 28, 2021	Nintendo Switch	Pixelnicks / Retroware
Eagle Island Twist	May 28, 2021	PlayStation 4	Pixelnicks / Retroware
Eagle Island Twist	May 28, 2021	Xbox One	Pixelnicks / Retroware
Axiom Verge 2	August 11, 2021	PlayStation 4	Thomas Happ Games
ExZeus: The Complete Collection	September 30, 2021	Xbox One	HyperDevBox, Sickhead Games / Ziggurat Interactive
ExZeus: The Complete Collection	September 30, 2021	PlayStation 4	HyperDevBox, Sickhead Games / Ziggurat Interactive
ExZeus: The Complete Collection	September 30, 2021	Nintendo Switch	HyperDevBox, Sickhead Games / Ziggurat Interactive
Fae Tactics	November 17, 2021	Xbox One	Endlessfluff Games / Humble Games
Fae Tactics	November 17, 2021	Windows	Endlessfluff Games / Humble Games
Prodeus	September 23, 2022	Windows	Bounding Box Software / Humble Games
Prodeus	September 23, 2022	Xbox One	Bounding Box Software / Humble Games
Prodeus	September 23, 2022	Xbox Series X/S	Bounding Box Software / Humble Games
Prodeus	September 23, 2022	PlayStation 4	Bounding Box Software / Humble Games
Prodeus	September 23, 2022	PlayStation 5	Bounding Box Software / Humble Games
Prodeus	October 28, 2022	Nintendo Switch	Bounding Box Software / Humble Games
Space Engineers	May 11, 2023	PlayStation 4	Keen Software House
Enclave HD	June 29, 2023	Nintendo Switch	Starbreeze Studios / Ziggurat Interactive
Enclave HD	June 29, 2023	PlayStation 4	Starbreeze Studios / Ziggurat Interactive
Enclave HD	June 29, 2023	Xbox One	Starbreeze Studios / Ziggurat Interactive
Until Then	June 25, 2024	PlayStation 5	Polychroma Games / Maximum Games
Real Heroes: Firefighter HD	December 6, 2024	PlayStation 5	Epicenter Studios / Ziggurat Interactive
Jaleco Sports: GOAL!	June 26, 2025	Windows	Jaleco, Sickhead Games / Rock It Games
Jaleco Sports: GOAL!	November 20, 2025	PlayStation 4	Jaleco, Sickhead Games / Rock It Games
Jaleco Sports: GOAL!	April 2, 2026	Nintendo Switch	Jaleco, Sickhead Games / Rock It Games
Jaleco Sports: Bases Loaded	April 15, 2025	Windows	Jaleco, Sickhead Games / Rock It Games
Jaleco Sports: Bases Loaded	November 20, 2025	Nintendo Switch	Jaleco, Sickhead Games / Rock It Games
Jaleco Sports: Bases Loaded	November 20, 2025	PlayStation 4	Jaleco, Sickhead Games / Rock It Games
Jaleco Sports: GOAL! 2	April 2, 2026	Nintendo Switch	Jaleco, Sickhead Games / Rock It Games
Jaleco Sports: GOAL! 2	April 2, 2026	PlayStation 4	Jaleco, Sickhead Games / Rock It Games
Jaleco Sports: Bases Loaded 2	April 2, 2026	Nintendo Switch	Jaleco, Sickhead Games / Rock It Games
Jaleco Sports: Bases Loaded 2	April 2, 2026	PlayStation 4	Jaleco, Sickhead Games / Rock It Games
Tamashika	April 21, 2026	Nintendo Switch	QuickTequila / EDGLRD
Tamashika	April 21, 2026	Xbox One	QuickTequila / EDGLRD
Tamashika	April 21, 2026	Xbox Series X/S	QuickTequila / EDGLRD
Tamashika	April 21, 2026	Windows Store	QuickTequila / EDGLRD
Tamashika	April 21, 2026	PlayStation 5	QuickTequila / EDGLRD
Kynseed	August 4, 2026	Nintendo Switch	PixelCount Studios
Kynseed	August 4, 2026	PlayStation 4	PixelCount Studios
Kynseed	August 4, 2026	PlayStation 5	PixelCount Studios
Kynseed	August 4, 2026	Xbox Series X/S	PixelCount Studios
Jaleco Sports: Faceoffs	September 4, 2026	PlayStation 5	Jaleco, Sickhead Games / Rock It Games
Jaleco Sports: Faceoffs	September 4, 2026	Nintendo Switch	Jaleco, Sickhead Games / Rock It Games
The Royal Writ	September 10, 2026	Nintendo Switch	Save Sloth Studios / Yogscast Games
The Royal Writ	September 10, 2026	PlayStation 5	Save Sloth Studios / Yogscast Games
The Royal Writ	September 10, 2026	Xbox Series X/S	Save Sloth Studios / Yogscast Games
