= DK2 =

DK2 may refer to:

== Entertainment ==
- Donkey Kong Jr., a 1982 video game sometimes unofficially referred to as "Donkey Kong 2"
- Donkey Kong II, a 1983 Game & Watch game
- Dungeon Keeper 2, a 1999 video game
- Door Kickers 2: Task Force North, a 2025 video game
- The Dark Knight Strikes Again, a 2001–2002 Batman comic series

== Other uses ==
- Oculus Rift Development Kit 2, a virtual reality headset released in 2014
- Droga krajowa nr 2, a national road in Poland
