= Tom Spilman =

American programmer and businessman

- Occupation(s): Programmer, Game developer

Tom Spilman is a programmer, founder, and co-owner at Sickhead Games, a Dallas-based indie game development studio, and a project lead on the MonoGame open source game framework. Spilman has lectured publicly about MonoGame at the 2014 Game Developers Conference and Microsoft Virtual Academy.
