= Ex Zeus =

2003 video game

- European box art
- Developers: HyperDevbox Japan, Octopus Studio (iPhone, Android)
- Publishers: Windows; HyperDevbox Japan; PlayStation 2 Metro3D; Wii: NA: Conspiracy Entertainment; EU: 505 Games
- Director: Carlo Perconti
- Designer: Carlo Perconti
- Programmers: Carlo Perconti; Christophe Le Bouil
- Artists: Makoto Higuchi; Hiroyuki Nakashima
- Composers: Michel Golgevit; Olivier Rabat
- Platforms: Arcade, Wii, PlayStation 2, iPhone OS, Microsoft Windows, Android
- Release: Microsoft Windows: EU: May 1, 2003; PlayStation 2: EU: October 20, 2004; Wii: NA: October 5, 2007; EU: April 1, 2008; iPhone; 2009 Android; 2010
- Genre: Rail shooter
- Mode: Single-player

ExZeus (also known as Counter Force for the Wii release) is a video game developed by HyperDevbox Japan. Despite the company's name, it was founded by Carlo Perconti, one of the founders of the France-based video game company Toka who moved to Japan and set up a game development studio in Tokyo. It was released in 2003 for the arcades running on a Tsunami Visual Technologies TsuMo arcade cabinet and was later released for Microsoft Windows as shareware. In 2004, a PlayStation 2 version was released in 2004 as a budget title by Conspiracy Entertainment exclusively in Europe. Then in 2005, the game had a re-release in the arcades, this time running on Sega NAOMI GD-ROM hardware, and only released in Japanese arcades. It was later released to the Wii under the working title of Shoot Out, later changed to Counter Force, and released in 2007. It was ported in 2009 for the iPhone by Octopus Studio, under the name ExZeus. An Android port by Octopus Studio was released in 2010.

== Reception ==
IGN gave the Wii version a positive review, praising its accurate infrared controls, graphical design, and "deep-rooted sense of nostalgic fun". However, they scored the game a 4/10 based on its price, saying "If it was on Wii Ware for $5, we’d have a hard time not nerding out entirely".

== Re-release ==
In August 2021, video game publisher Ziggurat Interactive announced through their YouTube channel that they would be re-releasing ExZeus and ExZeus 2 as ExZeus: The Complete Collection for PC, Xbox One, PlayStation 4, and Nintendo Switch in Summer 2021, with porting completed by developer Sickhead Games.
