= Venture Arctic =

2007 video game

- Developer: Pocketwatch Games
- Publishers: Pocketwatch Games; Brighter Minds Media
- Designer: Andy Schatz
- Series: World Ventures
- Engine: Torque Game Engine
- Platforms: Windows, Mac
- Release: NA: May 2007
- Genre: Simulation
- Mode: Single-player

Venture Arctic is an ecosystem simulation video game from Pocketwatch Games. Following its predecessor Wildlife Tycoon: Venture Africa, this Arctic sequel combines educational value and entertainment. The game allows players to build and manage ecosystems of Arctic animals by interacting with the environment using "tools of nature", such as the sun, snow, wind, and sickness.

There are five different environments in the game, from an oil-rig off the coast of Svalbard, Norway, to a new pipeline disturbing the caribou herds in the Alaskan level. While the game maintains impartiality on environmental issues, players are left to discover for themselves the impact of global warming and deforestation throughout the seasons in their sim-ecosystems and the 22 animal species which comprise them.

The visual art was inspired by traditional Inuit sculpture. The music is a reinterpretation of Vivaldi's Four Seasons Concerto using Inuit-inspired instruments and instruments brought to the region by explorers. Venture Arctic was designed, produced, and programmed by Andy Schatz, founder of Pocketwatch Games and host of the 2007 and 2008 Independent Games Festival Awards ceremonies.
