= Tooth and Tail =

2017 video game

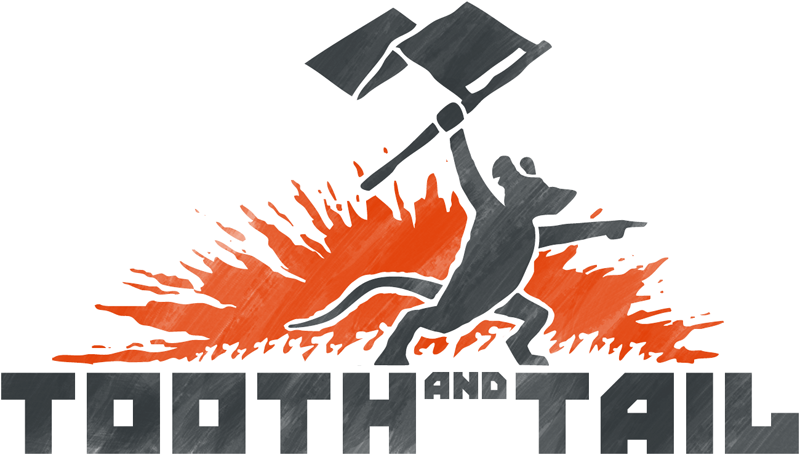
- Developer: Pocketwatch Games
- Publisher: Pocketwatch Games
- Platforms: Microsoft Windows, MacOS, Linux, PlayStation 4
- Release: September 12, 2017
- Genre: Real-time strategy
- Modes: Single-player, multiplayer

Tooth and Tail is a real-time strategy video game developed and published by indie development team Pocketwatch Games, the company behind Monaco: What's Yours Is Mine. Tooth and Tail was released in September 2017 for Windows, MacOS, Linux and PlayStation 4.

The game is set in a society of anthropomorphic animals during a time of severe food shortages, resulting in the uprising of political parties with differing ideologies regarding the acquisition of food. The gameplay consists of single-player and multiplayer modes and supports gamepads and keyboard and mouse arrangements. Players begin by choosing six units out of a pool of twenty to use during the match. Once each player has chosen, the goal is to destroy the enemy's resources through building structures and creating units. Each player controls a commander rather than having a top-down view.

Development of Tooth and Tail began towards the end of development for Monaco. Various real-time strategy (RTS) games were prototyped before the game, then titled Armada, was announced in March 2014. The premise was to create an RTS game without micromanagement or the necessity of high quantities of actions per minute. From the outset, the game was designed to work well on both gamepads and keyboard-and-mouse setups. In August 2014, the game's title was changed to Lead to Fire before being finally changed to Tooth and Tail, a reference to the tooth-to-tail ratio, in August 2015. Before its official release, the game's developers proposed a launch on Steam's Early Access platform, though this did not occur.

The game was positively received and won two awards in 2016; "Best Character Design" at Intel Level Up and tied with Giant Cop for "Guest's Pick" at Media Indie Exchange. The single-player mode was not praised as highly as the multiplayer modes; reviewers said the difficulty spikes impaired enjoyment. Many comparisons with other games and media were made; mostly with the novel series Redwall and the novella Animal Farm.

== Plot ==
Tooth and Tail is set during the 19th century in a society where anthropomorphic animals are facing chronic food shortages. Many animals decided to resort to cannibalism to overcome the shortage. The Civilized, led by Archimedes, created a lottery system that ultimately controlled who was eaten. This way of life sparked controversy throughout the nation; the Commonfolk liked neither the idea of being eaten nor the high cost of food. The son of the wealthy merchant Bellafide was selected to be eaten; he revolted, intending to reshape the food-selection system into one based on some version of a meritocracy. The Commonfolk—led by Hopper who wanted to impose a voting system to replace the lottery—also revolted. To overthrow the Civilized, Hopper and Bellafide joined forces despite their different ideals.

The Civilized engaged in the fight to maintain power and the status quo. Though the revolution had thrown the leadership into general chaos, certain military elements remained organized. Quartermaster, the shady and pragmatic head of the late Tsarina's K.S.R secret police, seized control of military elements and supported Archimedes and the Civilized for the time being.

Towards the end of the game, the pigs, who are dying out from the war, tell the four armies they had relayed false information to the three other armies, tricking them into gathering in one location. As the armies fight each other to the point of destruction, the pigs revolt, revealing they had a plan to overthrow the Tsarina and get revenge for the slavery and eating of their kind. A horde of pigs then ambushes the final standing army, destroying it and leaving the fate of the commanders and the rest of the meat-eating animals ambiguous.

== Gameplay ==
Gameplay of Tooth and Tail

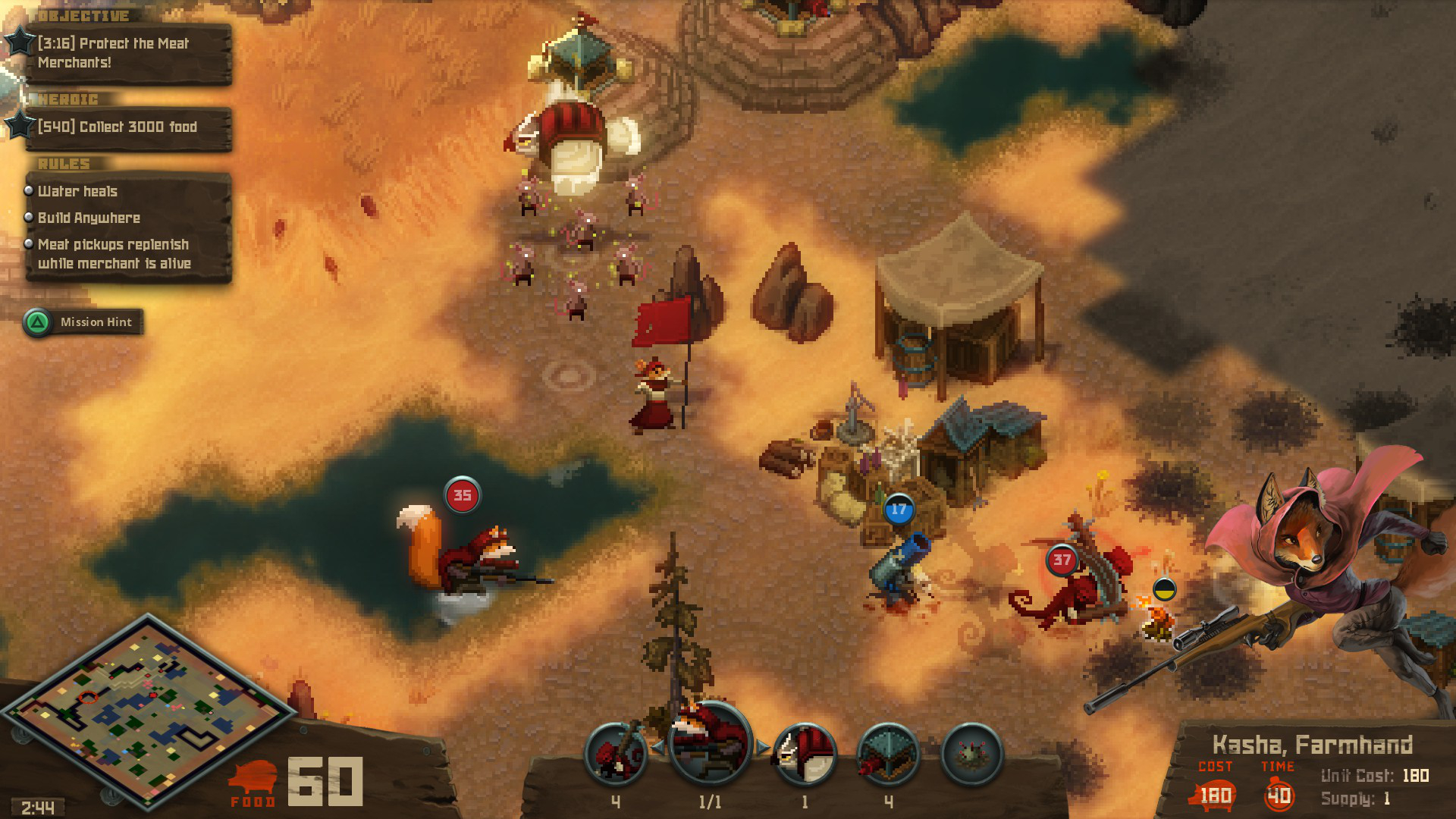
A screenshot of the game showing the HUD, along with various structures and units

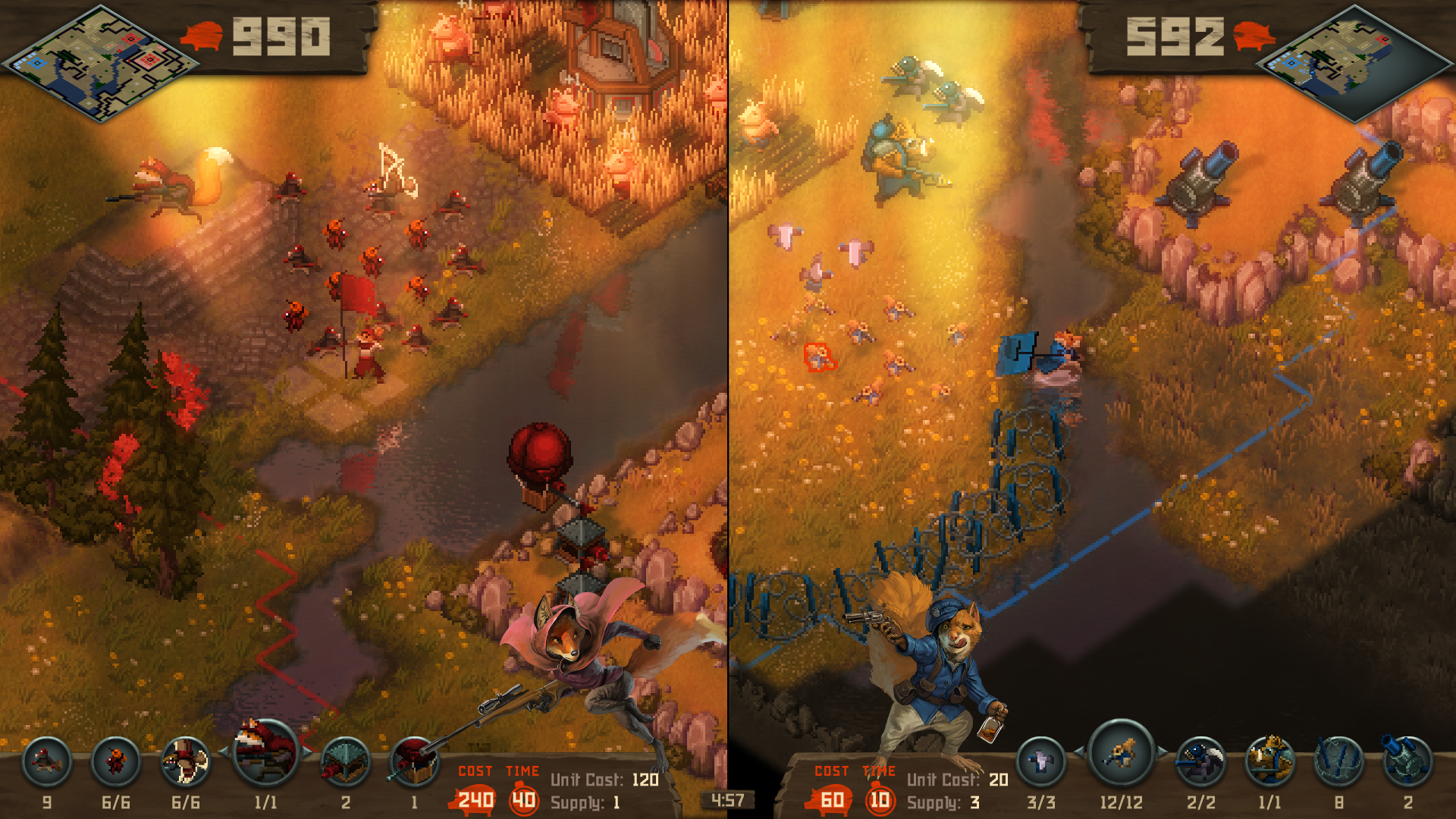
A demonstration of the game's split screen capabilities

Tooth and Tail is a real-time strategy video game designed for use with gamepads and keyboard-and-mouse setups. The game has single-player and multiplayer modes. In the single-player mode, the player progresses through the story by completing levels of increasing difficulty. Each level features objectives with varying degrees of onerousness, depending on the player's advancement. To complete each level, the basic objectives must be met while "heroic" ones—usually more arduous—are optional. Multiplayer mode can be accomplished through ranked or unranked online matchmaking and local multiplayer split screen. Up to four players may play at once, either as teams of two or compete to be the last one standing.

Before a match begins, players must choose a commander from four factions and then draft six units from a pool of twenty to use during the match. Fifteen of these units are offensive and tiered depending on their strength and cost. The other five units are defensive. All choices are final; other units cannot be unlocked during the match. Once all players have chosen their units, they control a commander of an army and must build structures, such as farms, to gather required resources. Most structures can only be built near gristmills, preventing players from building near enemies while scouting or spying. At any time, players can burrow their commanders back to allow them to create structures. Units are produced at structures called warrens, assuming the player has sufficient food to summon the desired units. Depending on the tier, some units cost more than others. Food is a limited resource, meaning players must strategize their attack in advance. Structures called campfires act as a combination of gristmills and farms, allowing structures to be built near them while also producing food. To win, the player must destroy the enemy's gristmills and campfires. The map is procedurally generated, implying each player will have different advantages and disadvantages each match.

== Development ==
Following the success of Pocketwatch Games' 2013 video game Monaco: What's Yours Is Mine, the development of Tooth and Tail was announced on March 11, 2014. The game was loosely based on a design Andy Schatz, the founder of Pocketwatch Games, and roommate Tom Wexler had made during college, called Dino Drop. As with the development of Monaco, many games with similar mechanics were prototyped. Schatz told Jim Rossignol of Rock, Paper, Shotgun about Dino Drop, which he described as "a split-screen strategy game with autonomous units". Schatz and co-designer Andy Nguyen heavily developed this version of real-time strategy towards the end of Monaco's development. Originally developed under the working title Armada—stylized as [ARMADA]—the game was advertised as a real-time strategy (RTS) game without the necessary micromanagement and high quantity of actions per minute, an issue he attributed to the StarCraft series; Starcraft and Command & Conquer were credited as influences on Tooth and Tail.

Armada was developed to appeal to people who did not usually play RTS games but also had the ability to "play [the] game at a deep level". The game was designed to be controller and gamepad friendly; Schatz implied there had been no "good" RTS games that used them. Schatz compared Armada with Monaco, saying "I want to do the thing with RTS that we did with Monaco, with the stealth genre, and that's constrain the control set in order to make the actual, physical interaction easy to pick up without limiting the complexity of the game itself". He pitched this idea to around forty people at the Game Developers Conference to positive feedback. At this point, there was no timeframe for development and no definite specifics (such as the title, theme, and style).

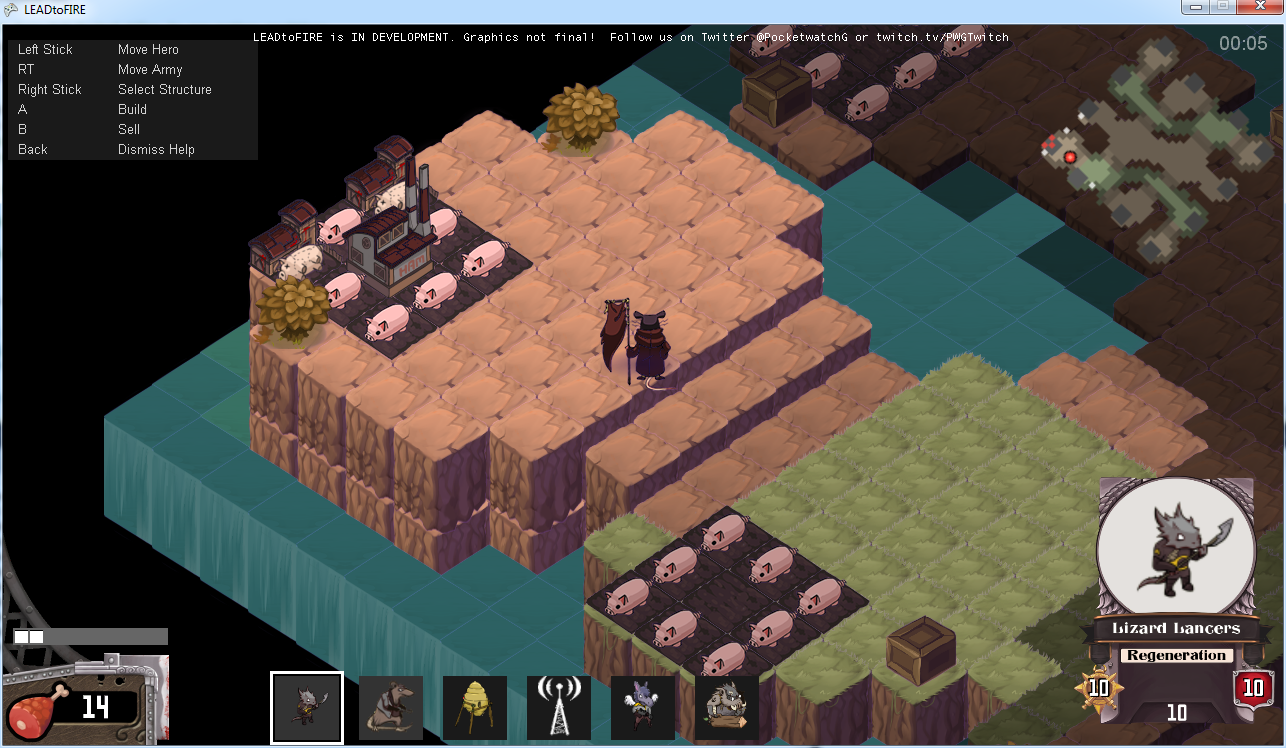
Screenshot of Tooth and Tail when it was titled LEADtoFIRE

The game's title was later changed to Lead to Fire—stylized as LEADtoFIRE—in August 2014. Throughout these stages of development, Pocketwatch Games streamed their progress on the streaming platform Twitch. This was described as a "miniature PAX"; a way to show off the development and allow fans to play test the game. It was around this time that the game drew inspiration from Blizzard Entertainment and Hearthstone, a card game in which players build decks and compete against others. This comparison was drawn as Schatz expressed admiration for the ability of Blizzard Entertainment, the developers of Hearthstone, to simplify complicated game genre mechanics for a wider audience, using Hearthstone as an example for card games and Heroes of the Storm for multiplayer online battle arenas. Schatz believed Tooth and Tail could be a similar simplification of the StarCraft series. At this stage, it was planned to have around thirty units and structures to interact and build, and while this was not yet definitive, it was estimated players would be able to choose six-to-eight of them per match. Around this time, Polygon reported a tentative release date of "sometime in 2015"

In August 2015, the game received its official name: Tooth and Tail. The change was attributed to Lead to Fire not boding well with the developers, and believing no one knew how to properly pronounce it. The title is a reference to the tooth-to-tail ratio; the art style was revealed at the same time as the official title. Schatz wrote that like SpyParty, "the game should look utterly shitty until it's absolutely amazing". The art style was described as a modernized version of 1990s pixel art. Having released the official artwork, the development process became more public and the team believed the game would be released in late 2016, with the possibility of using Steam's Early Access platform.

Composer Austin Wintory, who also worked on Monaco, was hired to create the game's soundtrack. Sound design was done by PowerUp Audio, the team behind both Crypt of the Necrodancer and Darkest Dungeon. The game's characters speak a language based on Russian that was invented by PowerUp Audio's Kevin Regamey; Schatz told Louis Brierley of Heavy Mag the in-game language is translatable to English. In July 2017, Tooth and Tail's official release date of September 12 was announced for PlayStation 4, Microsoft Windows, macOS, and Linux. Alongside this announcement was the game's trailer. Since release, the development team plans to continue updating the game with new content.

== Reception ==
Tooth and Tail reviews

Aggregate scores
Aggregator	Score
Metacritic	PC: 80/100; PS4: 78/100
OpenCritic	80/100; 88% Critics Recommend

Review scores
Publication	Score
Destructoid	9.5/10
GameSpot	8/10
Hardcore Gamer	4/5
Eurogamer Italy	9/10
AusGamers	8.1/10

Awards
Publication	Award
Intel Level Up 2016	Best Character Design
Media Indie Exchange	Guest's Pick (tied)

=== Pre-release ===
Prior to Tooth and Tail's release, the game received substantial media coverage because of the development process being made public and the release of alpha play tests. Many writers compared Tooth and Tail to the novels Animal Farm and Redwall. Reviewers including Adam Smith of Rock, Paper, Shotgun, Kyle LeClair of Hardcore Gamer and Tom Marks of PC Gamer praised the game for redesigning the concept of the real-time strategy genre. In March 2017, Marks described the single player campaign as being similar to "a bite-sized StarCraft campaign." The art style was also praised prior to release.

=== Post-release ===
Tooth and Tail was released to positive reviews from critics, garnering "generally favorable reviews" on both PC and PS4 according to review aggregator website Metacritic.

Critics, such as Eric Van Allen of Kotaku, praised the game's ability to be inviting to newcomers to the real-time strategy genre while also appealing to veterans. Because of this, IGN listed it as a "game you might have missed" in September 2017. Davide Pessach of Eurogamer Italy recommended the game to everyone because of its many hours of fun. Patrick Hancock of Destructoid listed Tooth and Tail on his personal Game of the Year (GOTY) list, saying he would recommend it to anyone, including those who dislike real-time strategy games. Polygon writer Charlie Hall compared the game to StarCraft and wrote "the initial learning curve right now is simply too steep for most players". Brendan Caldwell of Rock, Paper, Shotgun concurred, saying "a tough mission [can] come along and take a chunk out of your enjoyment".

The gameplay mechanics of multiplayer matches, such as the length and controls, received mostly positive reception. Hall wrote that while the game's single-player mode may be poorly balanced, the multiplayer mode is where the game excels. In Hancock's GOTY list, he noted the game would have appeared on it had it been a single-player game with the multiplayer mode as "a cherry on top". Hall said that because matches last around ten minutes, he found himself saying "just one more [match]". He said while the controls were good for newcomers, they have the potential to dissuade strategy veterans because of the inability to directly control certain units.

Tooth and Tail's art style, soundtrack, and audio received positive reactions from critics. Chloi Rad at IGN wrote that because of the combination of these elements, it was an "arcade-like strategy game experience like no other this year". Kotaku's Alex Walker praised Pocketwatch Games for their ability to create "truly, truly beautiful" artwork without spending "millions of dollars teams of artists". AusGamers's Kosta Andreadis considered the art, while not the most impressive of 2017, subtle and pleasing in its presentation. He praised the ability of the animation to change intensities depending on the setting. Andreadis also commented on the audio, believing it added to the experience. Hancock commented on the similarities between the soundtracks of Monaco's and Tooth and Tail; both of which were composed by Austin Wintory. The main similarities he noted were the fast-paced tracks during battle sequences and the use of slower tracks during less intense moments to imply a "revolutionary feel". He concluded by commending the accomplishment of matching the soundtrack with the game's theme.

==== Awards and accolades ====
Tooth and Tail won the award for "Best Character Design" at Intel Level Up 2016 and tied with Giant Cop for the 2016 Media Indie Exchange's Guest's Pick. It was also nominated for "Gamer's Voice (Multiplayer)" at the 2017 SXSW Gamer's Voice Awards. The game was nominated for "Best Strategy Game" three times; once at The Game Awards 2017, once at PC Gamer's 2017 Game of the Year Awards, and once at IGN's Best of 2017 Awards. PC Gamer included Tooth and Tail on the list of the best game music of 2017. The game was nominated for the "Excellence in Narrative" award at the 2018 Independent Games Festival, and for "2017 ASCAP Video Game Score of the Year" at the ASCAP Composers' Choice Awards.
