= Monaco 2 =

- Developer: Pocketwatch Games
- Publisher: Humble Games
- Director: Andy Schatz
- Producer: Esmeralda Hoffman
- Designer: Clark Bakstran
- Programmer: Phil Homan
- Artist: Lee Dotson
- Writers: Chris Tihor; Cash DeCuir; Paul Rose; Kirsten Bakstran
- Composer: Austin Wintory
- Platforms: PlayStation 5; Windows; Xbox Series X/S
- Release: April 10, 2025
- Genres: Stealth, action

Monaco 2 is a stealth action video game developed by Pocketwatch Games and published by Balor Games. The game is a sequel to Monaco: What's Yours Is Mine (2013), and was released for PlayStation 5, Windows and Xbox Series X/S on April 10, 2025. The game includes a form of isometric 3D graphics as opposed to its predecessor's 2D birds-eye view. Further, Monaco 2's introduction of procedural level generation is new to the series.

== Gameplay ==
Like its predecessor, Monaco 2 is a stealth and action video game where the player partakes in heists and robberies. Players will be able to select from a cast of playable characters to assist them in completing the level. The game is planned to include 3D isometric graphics displayed through a top-down perspective with camera options to allow players to adjust their vision. Additionally, the introduction of procedural generation means the levels are not static.

== Development ==
Monaco 2 is set to be the sequel to the award winning Monaco: What's Yours Is Mine and was announced on March 17, 2022 during the Humble Games Showcase 2022 event by Pocketwatch Games' lead developer Andy Schatz. An animated teaser trailer accompanied the announcement. During the event, Schatz noted that the game would feature 3D graphics to allow players to explore vertically, a concept which was compared to Mission: Impossible, as well as procedural level generation. Despite these changes, he ensured that the game would remain faithful to the genres and themes of its predecessor. Another deviation from Monaco is the removal of the greyscale blueprint map design. At the time, Schatz described the game to be the "ultimate heist simulator", with the procedural generation helping to make the environments feel real. Immediate reception to the announcement was positive, especially regarding the early visualisations. Following the announcement, Schatz livestreamed the development of Monaco 2 on Twitch.tv.

The game released on April 10, 2025 for PC, PlayStation 5, and Xbox Series X/S.
