= Monaco: What's Yours Is Mine =

2013 stealth video game

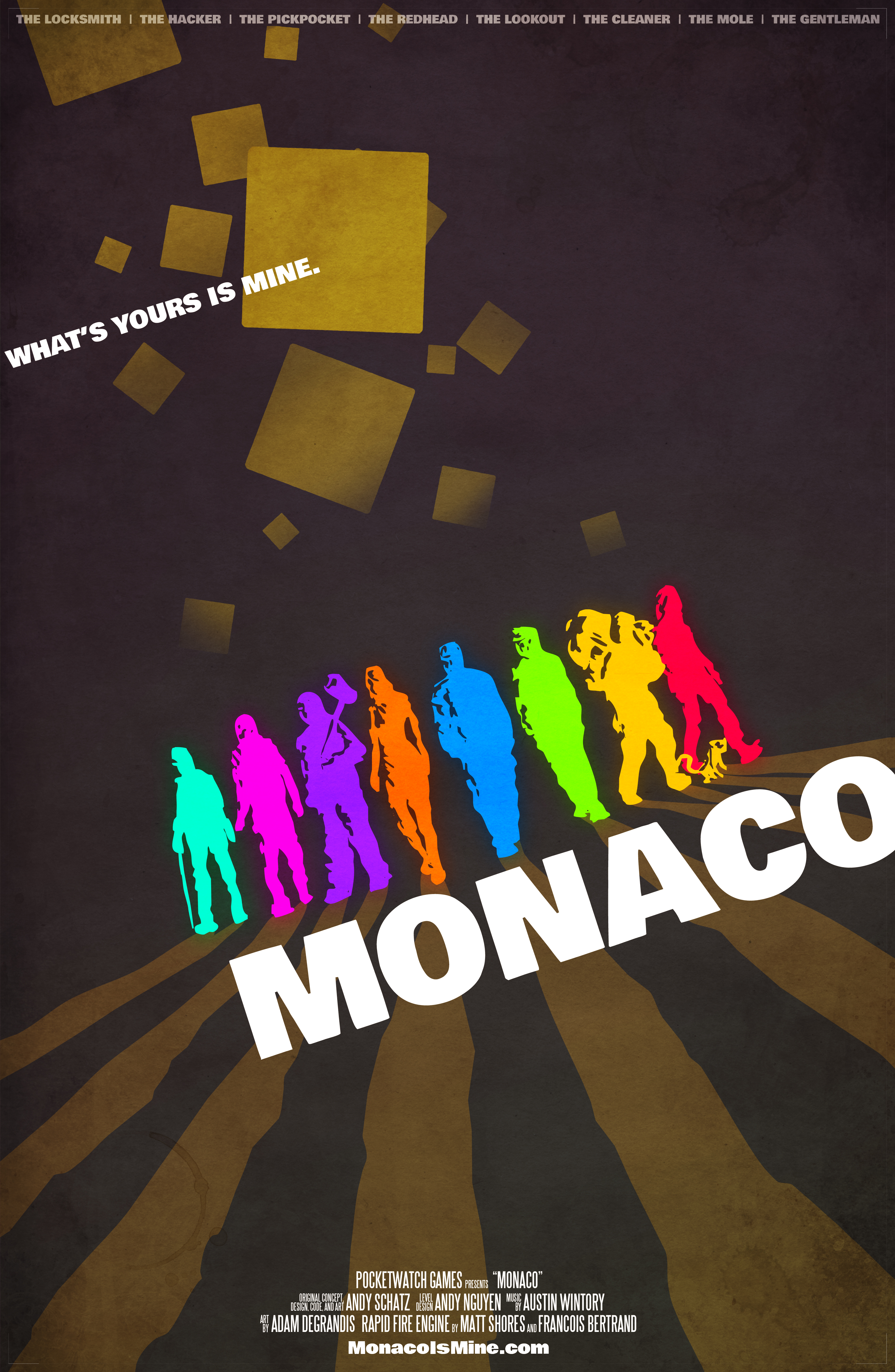
- Promotional poster in the style of a film poster
- Developer: Pocketwatch Games
- Publishers: Pocketwatch Games; Majesco (Xbox 360); Humble Games (Nintendo Switch)
- Designers: Andy Schatz; Andy Nguyen
- Artists: Adam deGrandis; Andy Schatz; Ben Swinden
- Composer: Austin Wintory
- Platforms: Windows, Xbox 360, OS X, Linux, Nintendo Switch
- Release: April 24, 2013: Windows; April 24, 2013; Xbox 360; May 10, 2013; OS X; July 3, 2013; Linux; October 25, 2013; Nintendo Switch; October 21, 2019
- Genres: Stealth, action
- Modes: Single-player, multiplayer

Monaco: What's Yours Is Mine is a 2013 stealth video game developed by Pocketwatch Games in which players, alone or cooperatively, perform heists and robberies. Players choose from eight characters, each of whom has a unique and beneficial skill, such as the ability to change appearance or tunnel through walls. Monaco's single-player story is told in four acts from perspectives of different characters. The cooperative mode lets up to four players play together in different locations.

Lead developer Andy Schatz began developing Monaco while working for TKO Software. He later founded his independent company Pocketwatch, where he continued development and planned to release it as an Xbox Live Indie Game. While looking for playtesters, Schatz met Andy Nguyen, who became a level designer, producer, and promoter for Monaco. Pocketwatch Games released the game in 2013 for Windows, OS X, and Linux. Majesco handled its Xbox 360 release after Microsoft Game Studios twice rejected the game. A Nintendo Switch version, Monaco: Complete Edition, was released in 2019 by Humble Games.

Monaco received positive reviews and won two awards at the 2010 Independent Games Festival. Critics praised its cooperative modes but considered its single-player gameplay inferior for lacking content. Frequently compared to heist films, reviewers praised Monaco's art style and how its minimalist design suited its gameplay. Austin Wintory's soundtrack also received praise. Pocketwatch announced a sequel, Monaco 2, in March 2022.

== Gameplay ==
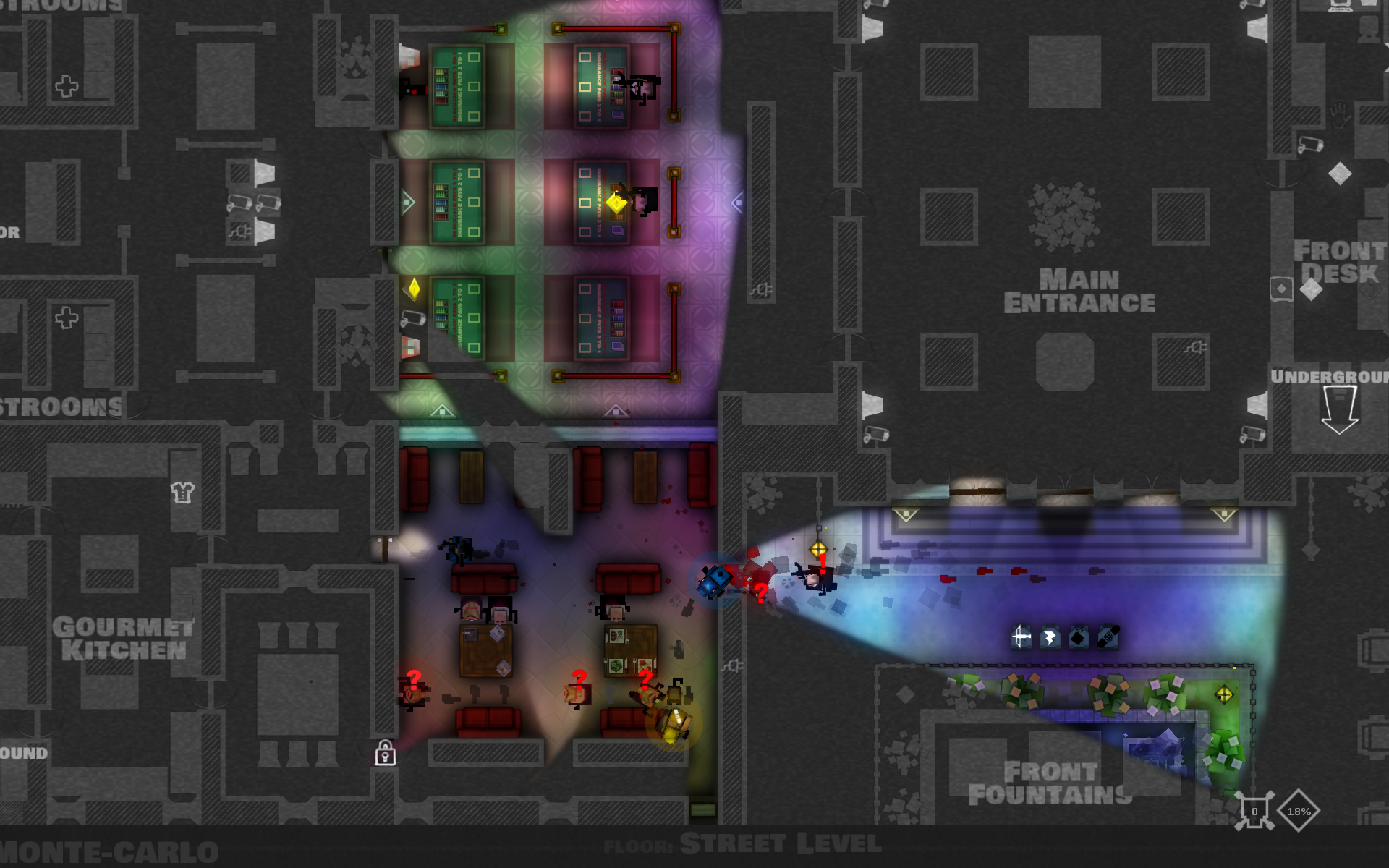
Players can work together to pull off heists in many locations. Note that the map is greyed out for areas where the players lack line of sight.

Monaco is a stealth video game played through a top-down perspective. It features single-player and cooperative modes, allowing up to four players to partake in heists and robberies. The game has four main campaigns for the player to complete, each through the perspective of a different character. Each campaign is split into individual missions. Missions take place in locations varying from nightclubs to yachts, with different obstacles and problems to solve. As players only have vision of areas within direct line of sight, they must traverse each mission strategically to navigate the fog of war shrouding the map. Players work together to complete the missions; if one player dies, another must revive them before finishing the mission. The campaign is offered in two modes: "Classic", which is the original and full-length story, and "Enhanced", which is a condensed version released in a later update. Outside of the campaign, Monaco has other game modes, including a zombie mode and player vs player maps.

There are eight characters, each with different traits and advantages; the Locksmith, the Cleaner, the Lookout, and the Pickpocket are available immediately, while the Mole, the Gentleman, the Redhead, and the Hacker must be unlocked as the campaign progresses. The Locksmith can open doors faster than other characters; the Lookout is able to see enemies who are not in the player's direct line of sight; the Pickpocket owns a coin-collecting monkey; the Cleaner can put guards to sleep; the Mole can dig through walls and open vents quickly; the Gentleman has the ability to temporarily change his appearance, making the player less detectable to enemies; the Hacker has the ability to upload computer viruses to security systems, shutting them off temporarily; and the Redhead can charm enemies into not attacking and making characters follow her. Players can select one character per mission, with different levels suiting different characters. However, each mission can be completed with any character, and the strategy depends on the chosen characters.

Players can find and use items in each mission, including smoke bombs and C4 explosives, as well as firearms including a shotgun and machine gun. These items are single-use, but can be replenished by collecting ten coins scattered around the missions. Items are not shared in the cooperative mode, meaning only the player who collects the coins receives the bonus.

== Plot ==
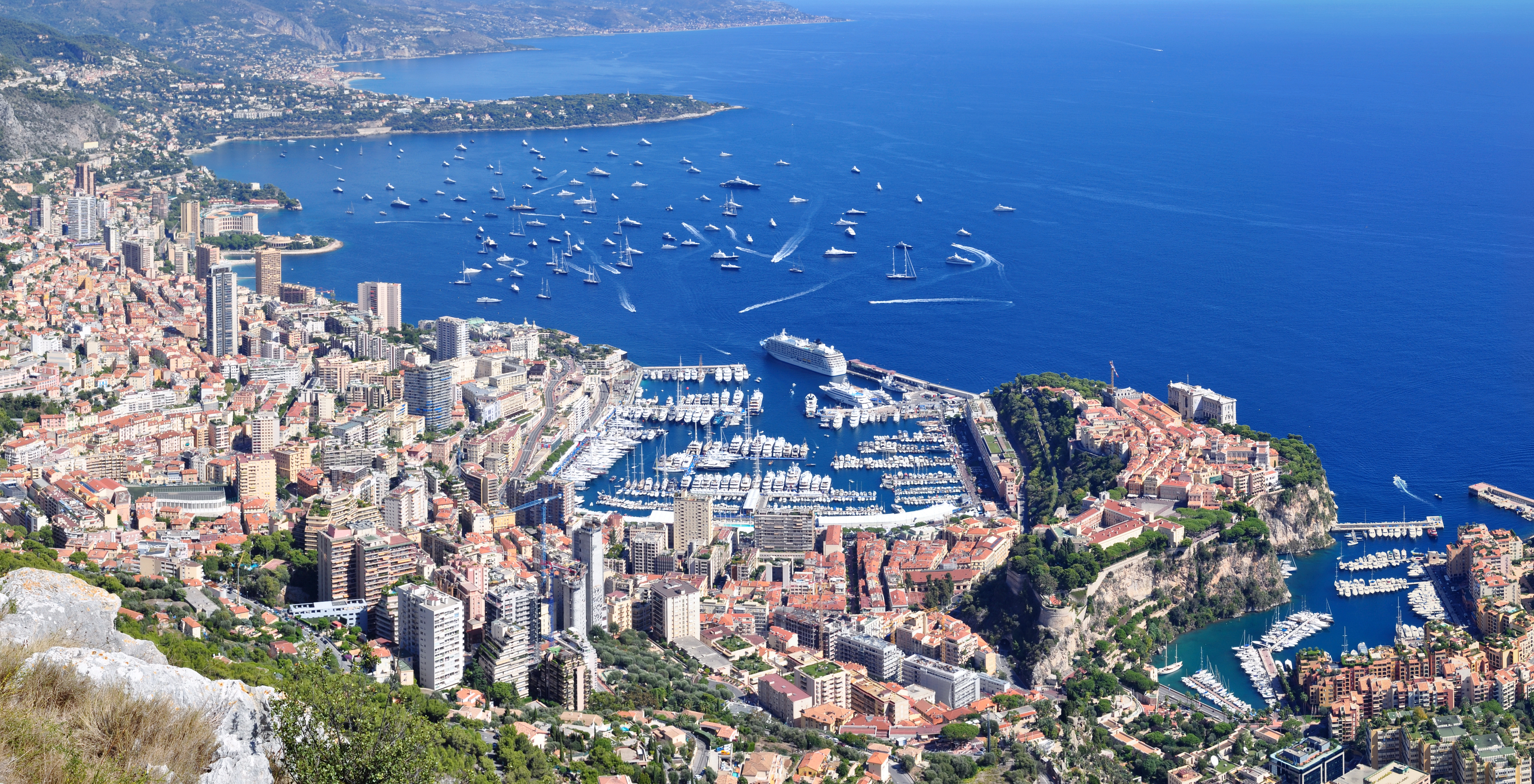
A panoramic view of Monaco, the namesake and primary setting for the game, pictured here from the Tête de Chien lookout

The Locksmith is questioned by Inspector Voltaire about his recent actions with the Pickpocket, the Cleaner, and Lookout. The Locksmith describes the criminals' prison escape in Monaco alongside another inmate, the Mole. They meet the Gentleman while stealing passports and money to be smuggled out of the country. They board the Gentleman's booby-trapped yacht and try to leave the harbor; while doing so, the Gentleman receives an anonymous telephone call from a man he later identifies as Davide, after which the boat explodes. After receiving medical care at a hospital, the thieves help the Gentleman dispose of evidence from a previous heist and rescue his girlfriend, the Redhead. The group proceeds to steal valuables and hire the Hacker. While attempting to steal from a casino, they are caught by the police and taken back to prison.

The Pickpocket, next to be interviewed, recalls events differently from the Locksmith. He says the Hacker, the Redhead, and the Gentleman escaped with them. The Gentleman had experienced legal turmoil in his financial affairs, which drove the thieves to escape and retrieve the money. This intrigues Inspector Voltaire, who believed the money was used to smuggle them out of the country, whereas the Pickpocket claims that it was used to smuggle weapons. The Pickpocket reveals the crooks purposefully blew up the boat to distract Interpol. Later, Davide is believed to have been murdered at a nightclub until Inspector Voltaire receives a phone call revealing that Davide's DNA did not match any of the bodies. To further confuse the police, the thieves planted evidence with Davide's fingerprints at a different crime scene. After confessing this to Inspector Voltaire, the Pickpocket reveals he was a spy sent by Interpol. The Pickpocket claims the Gentleman has assumed Davide's identity and that if Inspector Voltaire attempts to confirm the story, the Gentleman will know one of his accomplices is a spy.

In exchange for asylum, Inspector Voltaire then interrogates the Lookout for information on the thieves' backgrounds. Inspector Voltaire asks about the Mole, whom the Lookout says has already been caught. She then tells him about herself and says she steals because of "a moral debt". When discussing why the Locksmith disregards the law, she recalls the time when he had his hand broken after being caught counting cards in blackjack. The Lookout informs Inspector Voltaire that the Pickpocket used to be rich before he was arrested and that the Hacker had also been in trouble before; he was caught trespassing in Interpol's headquarters. She says the Gentleman garnered the nickname "The Rat" because he was responsible for tipping off the police, leading to their recapture. The Lookout tells Inspector Voltaire that the Redhead used to be called the Blonde and was caught burgling the Gentleman's house, ultimately falling in love. The final thief she tells him about is the Cleaner, who she says is acting on behalf of his disabled brother. After disclosing this information, they begin discussing asylum.

Inspector Voltaire and Candide, a constable, are told the Locksmith, the Lookout, the Pickpocket, and the Hacker have escaped from prison. The two try and fail to recapture the thieves. They meet the Gentleman, for whom Candide works. Candide poisons Inspector Voltaire and the Mole disposes of the body.

== Development ==
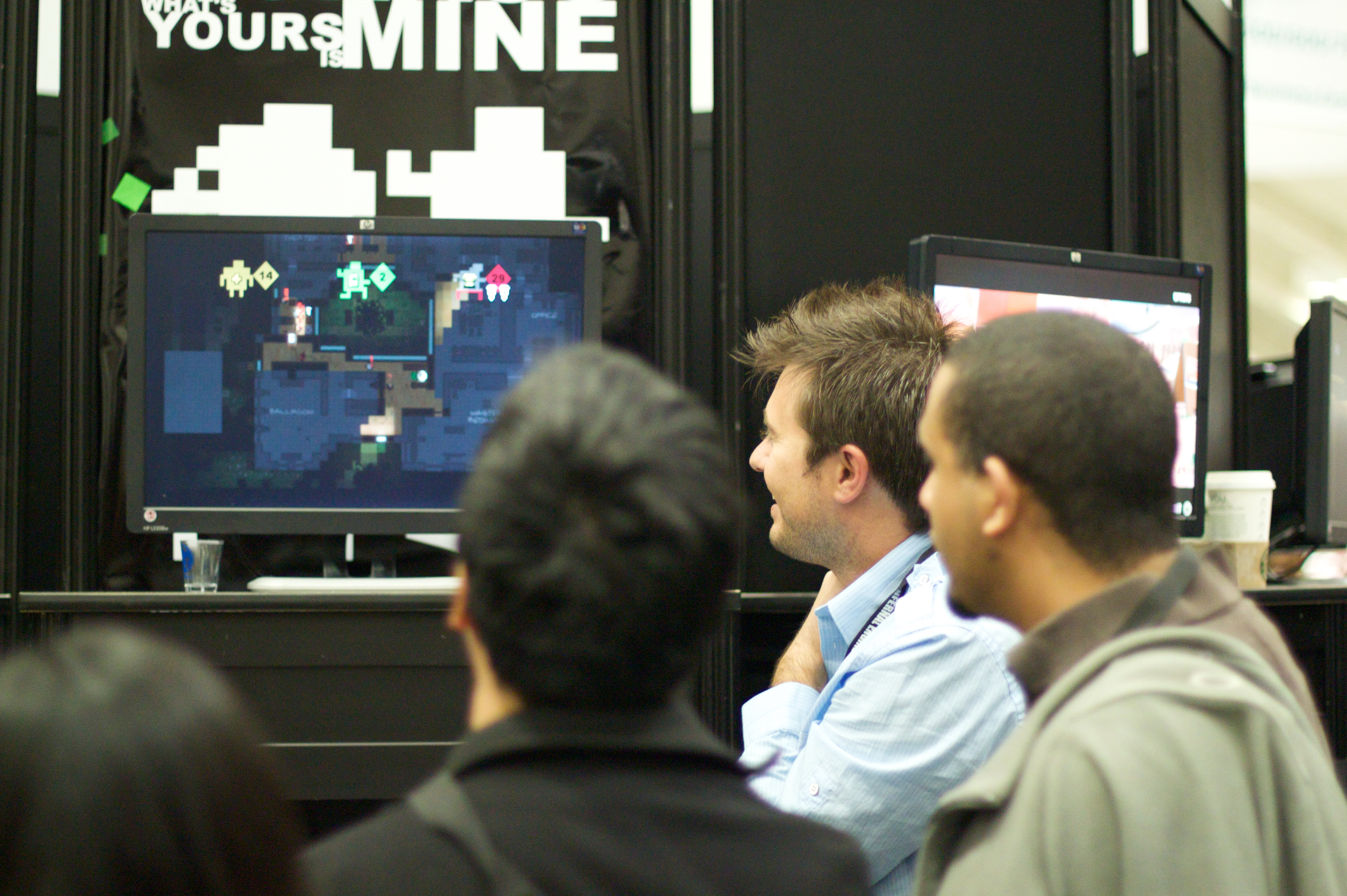
Andy Schatz displaying Monaco at the Game Developers Conference in 2010

Developer Andy Schatz first prototyped Monaco while working for TKO Software, a video game development company based in Santa Cruz, California. The prototype was a house-robbing game, where players would steal from others' homes while defending their own with traps. Schatz described it as a combination of The Sims, Diablo meets Hitman, and that the later indie game The Castle Doctrine had many similarities to this prototype. His original plan was to develop and release Monaco as an Xbox Live Indie Games game. The development at TKO was done in three weeks while the company searched for solicited paid work, although Monaco's development was ultimately shelved before TKO shut down. Schatz retained the contractual rights to the concept, and founded his own independent company, Pocketwatch Games. After Pocketwatch Games had experimented with simulation games, such as the 2006 Independent Games Festival finalist Wildlife Tycoon: Venture Africa, Schatz returned to Monaco's concept in 2009 and developed an early version of the game using Microsoft XNA to see if it worked on the Xbox 360, with the possibility of releasing the game onto the Xbox Live Indie Games portion of the Xbox Games Store. After only fifteen weeks of development, the game won the 2010 IGF award for "Excellence in Design" alongside the Seumas McNally Grand Prize. After this, the plan to release Monaco directly onto the Xbox Games Store was gone; having won two awards after a short period of development, Schatz described the game as "gold" that he did not want to risk. He was soon approached by Valve, who offered to publish the game on the Steam distribution platform.

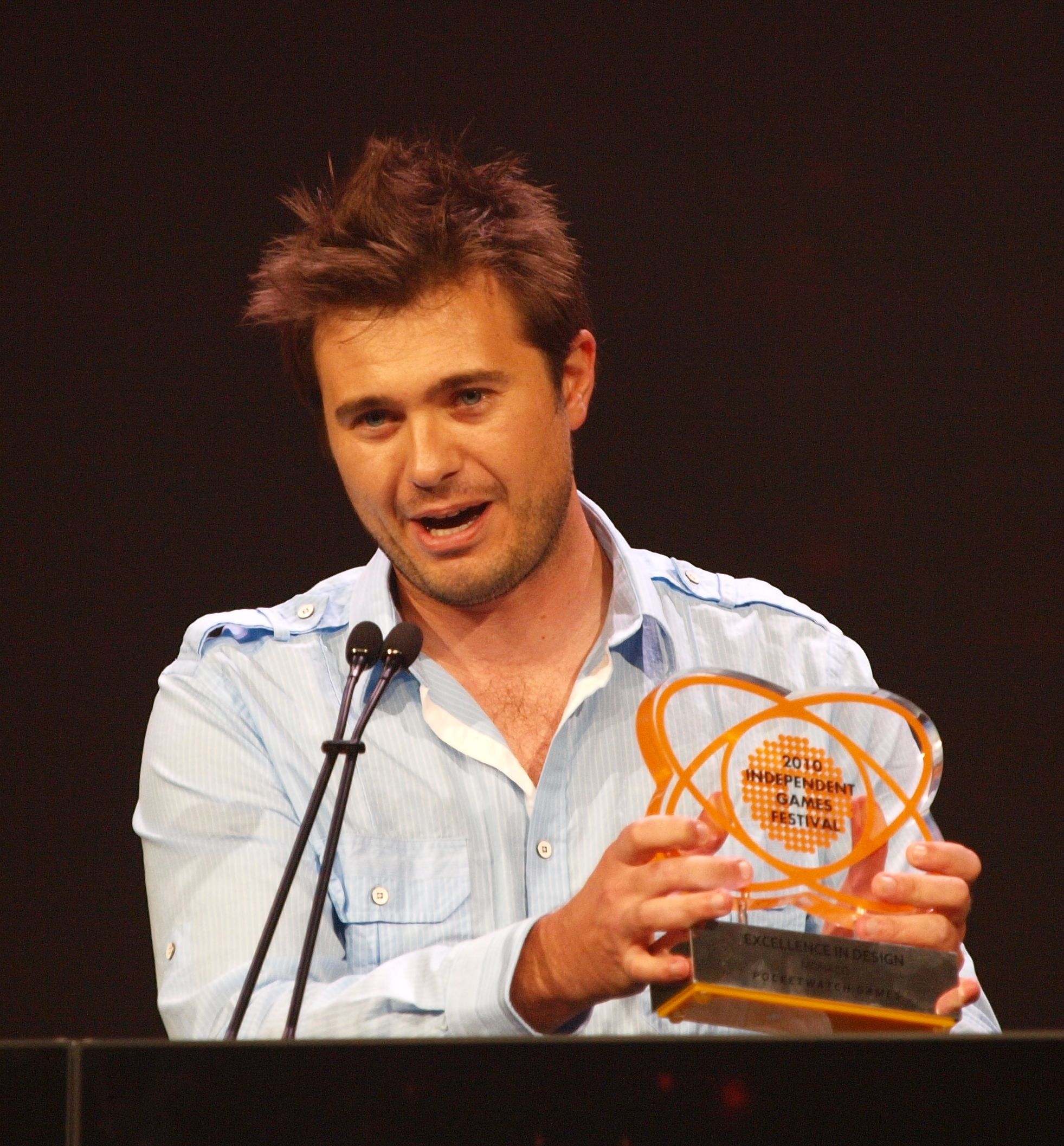
Andy Schatz accepting the award at the 2010 Independent Games Festival for "Excellence in Design"

For release on the Xbox 360, Schatz pitched the game to Microsoft Game Studios twice but was turned down due to marketability concerns. After these events, Schatz thought the game would not be released on the Xbox 360, disappointing him. He felt the platform and its marketplace were easy to work with and that it would have made an ideal platform for the game. Schatz considered releasing the game on PlayStation 3. Empty Clip Studios was hired to port the game to the RapidFire engine so it could be released on the PlayStation 3, but the port was never finished. Schatz decided to partner with a video game publishing company, Majesco. Majesco published the game on Xbox, while Schatz self-published the game on personal computer (PC).

Schatz met Andy Nguyen while looking for playtesters in 2011; he described Nguyen as a man he "clicked with" who made an energizing work environment. Schatz hired Nguyen to work in festival booths and to sell the company's merchandise at events. Nguyen did not know programming, but eventually became a level designer and producer for Monaco, leaving his job at Citibank to devote more time to the game and to Pocketwatch Games. Schatz described Nguyen as being critical about the game during its development in ways that ultimately improved its design. Also in 2011, Monaco received funding from the Indie Fund project. The additional funding relieved financial pressure and allowed them to refrain from rushing out an unfinished product.

The soundtrack for Monaco was composed by Grammy-nominated Austin Wintory, who had previously composed scores for several games, including Journey. Schatz originally used licensed music but asked Wintory to replace some of it with original pieces. Wintory later persuaded Schatz that a complete original soundtrack was warranted. Wintory was excited by the project because it involved using humorous "old-timey piano", saying, "when else am I ever going to be asked to write anything remotely like this?" The stylistic choice of primarily using pianos was explained by Schatz: "the music felt sneaky [and] naughty", with a "farcical silliness" he considered ideal for the game. Wintory described the score for Monaco as being a heavy deviation from Journey and his other past works, although during the 2012 Game Developers Conference explained that its purpose and goal of being able to tell a story through music remained the same. An album called the Gentleman's Private Collection was also produced, consisting of remixes of the original soundtrack by other composers, including Peter Hollens, Tina Guo—who played the violin in the Journey soundtrack—and Chipzel, who composed the soundtrack for Super Hexagon. The full original soundtrack and the Gentleman's Private Collection were released onto Wintory's microsite on Bandcamp on April 24, 2013.

=== Release ===
Monaco was released for Windows on April 24, 2013; the Xbox 360 version was delayed until May 10 that year. Mac and Linux versions were released on July 4 and October 21, 2013, respectively. After the release, Pocketwatch Games updated the game to include more levels and mini-games, including two campaign entries, "Origins" and "Fin", the final chapter. After this update's release, development was halted to allow Pocketwatch Games to focus on Tooth and Tail, their next game. On October 21, 2019, a port for the Nintendo Switch, Monaco: Complete Edition, was released which contained all the post-release PC content. The port was published on the Nintendo eShop by Humble Games.

== Reception ==
Reception

Aggregate score
Aggregator	Score
Metacritic	83/100 (PC); 81/100 (Xbox 360)

Review scores
Publication	Score
Destructoid	9.5/10
Edge	8/10
Giant Bomb	4/5
IGN	9/10
Polygon	7/10
Digital Spy	4/5

Awards
Publication	Award
Independent Games Festival	Seumas McNally Grand Prize
Independent Games Festival	Excellence in Design

The PC and Xbox 360 versions of Monaco received "generally favorable reviews", according to the review aggregation website Metacritic. The Nintendo Switch version also received favorable reviews. Destructoid's considered it the best 2013 co-op multiplayer game against games like Diablo III, Guacamelee!, and Payday 2. Despite praise, the Xbox 360 release sold poorly and Andy Schatz believed this was because of the weak demonstration version, the delayed release, and the bugs in the multiplayer mode. After its inclusion in a Humble Bundle, by March 2014, the game surpassed 750,000 sales and by that September, it had sold over a million. Overall, Monaco sold enough copies for Andy Schatz to have "no complaints".

The cooperative gamemode, one of the main selling points, was lauded by critics, while the single-player mode was less well reviewed. Marty Sliva (IGN) regarded it as being one of the best co-op experiences he had in a while and stated that the gameplay mechanics made it one of the most unique and addictive games released in 2013. This sentiment was echoed by Jeff Grubb (VentureBeat), who complimented the game's ability to be both an arcade and a strategic game. Riccio described it as a "well-oiled four-player game", as well as going on to compliment the plot progression. Despite almost universal praise for the cooperative mode, reviewers did not express the same admiration for the single-player mode. Grubb said the game should be skipped if there were no plans on playing it cooperatively. Scott Nichols (Digital Spy) agreed and remarked that while the game contained much content to discover, it is best done cooperatively. Danielle Riendeau (Polygon) considered the single-player mode unfinished and said it needed work. David Sanchez (GameZone) gave the game high praise in his review, and unlike the other critics, enjoyed both gamemodes.

While some reviewers criticised the repetitiveness of the levels, others commended the replayability. Francesco Serino (Eurogamer Italy) criticised the variation and complained it was not long until he saw similar levels because of the simplicity. While saying they were usually well-made, he opined that they were often made for certain characters, which adds more gameplay because of the time it takes to discover the best strategies. Alex Navarro (Giant Bomb) proposed a similar viewpoint and held the opinion that some of the later levels turned into "tedious exercises in trial-and-error". Conversely, Anton Bjurvald (Eurogamer Sweden) enjoyed the simplicity. However, he took issue with the artificial intelligence and critiqued them as being too easy to fool. Aaron Riccio (Slant Magazine) and the Edge staff commended the replayability, with the Edge staff saying that while they disliked the inability to preplan, they continued testing different strategies and approaches. Additionally, Serino appreciated the ability to select characters that matched different playstyles, but disliked that many levels felt designed for specific characters.

The soundtrack was well received by critics, and comparisons were drawn for both the game's music and gameplay. Kirk Hamilton (Kotaku) heavily enjoyed it and said Wintory had produced something that managed the tone and pace of the gameplay effectively, smoothly tying into the player's actions. Hamilton drew comparisons with Looney Tunes in this regard. Christian Donlan (Eurogamer) described the piano as akin to that of a vaudeville performance and echoed Hamilton's commendation that the soundtrack provided additional context queues for the stealthy gameplay. Donlan specifically praised the music found in the later levels. Outside the soundtrack, reviewers compared Monaco to other games and films, especially the heist film Ocean's Eleven, with Nichols saying Monaco shared its "ensemble cast, daring break-ins and carefully laid plans" and that it mimicked an "interactive heist flick". Bjurvald and Richard Grisham (GamesRadar) also made this connection, with further positive comparisons being drawn with Pac-Man, Metal Gear, and Wizard of Wor by Grishamm, calling the combination of influences "fresh and fun".

== Sequel ==
Monaco 2 (stylised as Monaco II) was announced by Pocketwatch Games and Humble Games on March 17, 2022, during the Humble Games Showcase 2022. During the announcement, Andy Schatz noted that the game would feature 3D graphics, as opposed to the 2D graphics in Monaco, to allow players to explore the levels vertically. However, Monaco 2 will retain Monaco's top-down view, though it will be aided by isometric camera options. Monaco 2 will also incorporate procedural level generation. The sequel will feature new playable characters, with none of the existing characters being confirmed to return. The sequel will retain the stealth and heist genres. As of the game's announcement, there is no release date established and only a PC release has been confirmed. As of April 10, 2025, the sequel has been released on Steam.
