= Critter Round-Up =

2008 video game

- Developers: Epicenter Studios; Konami
- Engine: Vicious Engine
- Platform: Wii
- Release: JP: March 25, 2008; NA: May 19, 2008; EU: August 29, 2008
- Genre: Puzzle
- Modes: Single player, multiplayer

Critter Round-Up (Saku Saku Animal Panic in Japan) is a puzzle video game developed by Epicenter Studios and Konami for the Wii. It was released as a WiiWare launch title in Japan on March 25, 2008, North America on May 19, 2008 and in Europe on August 29, 2008. It costs 1,000 Wii Points.

== Gameplay ==
The player controls a farmer who must build fences to contain several animals. Players must separate species from each other while avoiding running into them and keeping them away from predators. Occasionally, a present will drop from the sky which, if collected, gives the player a power-up such as food to attract the animals or a spray to repel them. Elements of the gameplay resemble that of the arcade game Qix.

The main Adventure Mode features 50 levels across five different environments, each with their own species. In addition, Critter Round-Up also features a Marathon mode with infinite levels and support for up to four players, as well as minigames such as Snowball Soccer and Predator Rampage.

== Development ==
During a brainstorming session, the Chief Creative Officer of developer Epicenter Studios, Brian Jury, had been thinking about games like Qix a lot, and was trying to think of a way to make a new game out of that kind of game. The method to executing this came to him in a dream. After this, he wrote down the concept and presented it to the team, and development of Critter Round-Up began. Development began in November 2007.

Epicenter Studios began working with Konami on the game after its agent recommended pitching ideas to it. Konami enjoyed the concept for Critter Roung-Up, with the caveats being that they wanted it to be a launch title for the Wii's WiiWare service. However, the exact date the service would launch was up in the air, and Epicenter had to guess when it may launch. They speculated that it would launch in March, and so they limited the development time to three months They were able to get it done in this span of time by using the Vicious Engine, which they were familiar with. They were also able to get the game made with only part-time support from one programmer. This engine also allowed them to more easily prototype ideas. Development was planned to be complete mid-February 2008, but the developers had a couple extra weeks of development time. A variety of ideas for the story were presented, including the idea that the protagonist was trying to prevent a "global critter genocide," but the game's story was kept simple. Because of the WiiWare's size limitations, they also had to manage the size of their game. Due to time constraints, a multiplayer mode had to be cut.

== Reception ==
Critter Round-Up received generally average to above average reviews.

Wii Fanboy gave it 7.5/10, believing that the gameplay was "fun and addicting" and "loaded with a surprising amount of depth." GameSpot gave it a 7/10, praising the co-op mode and calling it "a good choice for light puzzle action and wacky multiplayer fun", but noting that, with the game aimed towards a younger audience, "folks looking for a mature puzzler are advised to look elsewhere".

However, IGN gave it 6.1 out of 10, believing that while the game has its charms and might be "fascinating" for younger players, the gameplay becomes much less engaging after extended play and that the minigames were "forgettable". 1UP.com, which gave it a C grade, also claimed the minigames were "uniformly uninteresting" and the single player was a "one note" experience, but thought the co-op mode livened up the game. They also had trouble deciding if the cel-shaded graphics were a distinct style or just "sloppy and unrefined".
