= Rock of the Dead =

2010 video game

- Developer: Epicenter Studios
- Publishers: Conspiracy Entertainment; UFO Interactive Games
- Platforms: iOS, PlayStation 3, Xbox 360
- Release: iOS; September 2, 2010; PlayStation 3, Xbox 360: NA: October 19, 2010
- Genres: Rhythm game, Rail shooter

Rock of the Dead is a music video game. It was developed by Epicenter Studios and distributed by Conspiracy Entertainment and UFO Interactive Games. The game was released in 2010 for iOS, PlayStation 3, and Xbox 360.

== Gameplay ==
Players use a guitar or drum peripheral to control the game. Two players can play what is called a "competitive co-op" throughout the game.

== Plot ==
Players will take on the role of the main character (voiced by Neil Patrick Harris) who has the ability to defeat enemies (often zombies) with the power of rock as he searches for his love interest (voiced by Felicia Day). Players have a few weapons at their disposal (including a shield and blast power-up), but the player can only use these by strumming the correct colored fret buttons in order on their guitar controller. The developers have bands record rock versions of classical music.

== Development ==
Epicenter described the game, saying, "Picture Typing of the Dead but with Guitar Hero guitars."

While originally announced as a Wii exclusive title, the title would ultimately release on PlayStation 3, Xbox 360 and iOS. While Epicenter claimed that a planned Wii version was not cancelled and simply on the back burner, the game never saw a release on the Wii console.

== Reception ==
Reception

Aggregate score
Aggregator	Score	
Aggregator	PS3	Xbox 360
Metacritic	45/100	48/100

Review scores
Publication	Score	
Publication	PS3	Xbox 360
1Up.com	C−	C−
Destructoid	3/10	3/10
GamePro	N/A	2/5
GamesRadar+	N/A	2.5/5
IGN	5/10	5/10
Joystiq	N/A	2.5/5
PlayStation Official Magazine – UK	3/10	N/A
Official Xbox Magazine (US)	N/A	4.5/10

The game received "generally unfavorable reviews" on both platforms according to the review aggregation website Metacritic. David Wolinsky of 1UP.com felt there was a great idea on paper but was hampered by the "riffs and chord progressions" mechanic not corresponding to the background music, the soundtrack mostly consisting of "lazy, metal renditions" of classical compositions and the boss battles being stale and "arbitrarily drag on too long," concluding that: "There's a great idea lurking around in Rock Of The Dead's dumb-fun concept, but instead the game winds up being dumb even when it isn't trying to be." Corey Cohen from the Official Xbox Magazine was also intriguted by the idea but criticized the repetitive "key-smacking gameplay" and "campy but laugh-less" tone, concluding that: "With co-op play, four difficulty levels, and multi-instrument support, Rock's developers clearly put effort into it. We just wish it were a shorter, cheaper proposition — like a $10 slice on Live Arcade. Even at $40, it's hard to recommend to anyone besides serious thrashmasters." Will Herring of GamePro found it to be a "surprisingly lengthy game" that boasts a great concept but was poorly executed in its "mundane gameplay", "cluttered interface", overused tracks and a "barebones presentation." Ian Bonds of Destructoid criticized the "confusing controls", lack of a targeting system and the "hum drum voicework" from an inconsistent cast, concluding that: "[T]his game does not in fact rock, but succeeds in doing quite the opposite."
