= Andy Schatz =

American video game developer (born 1978)

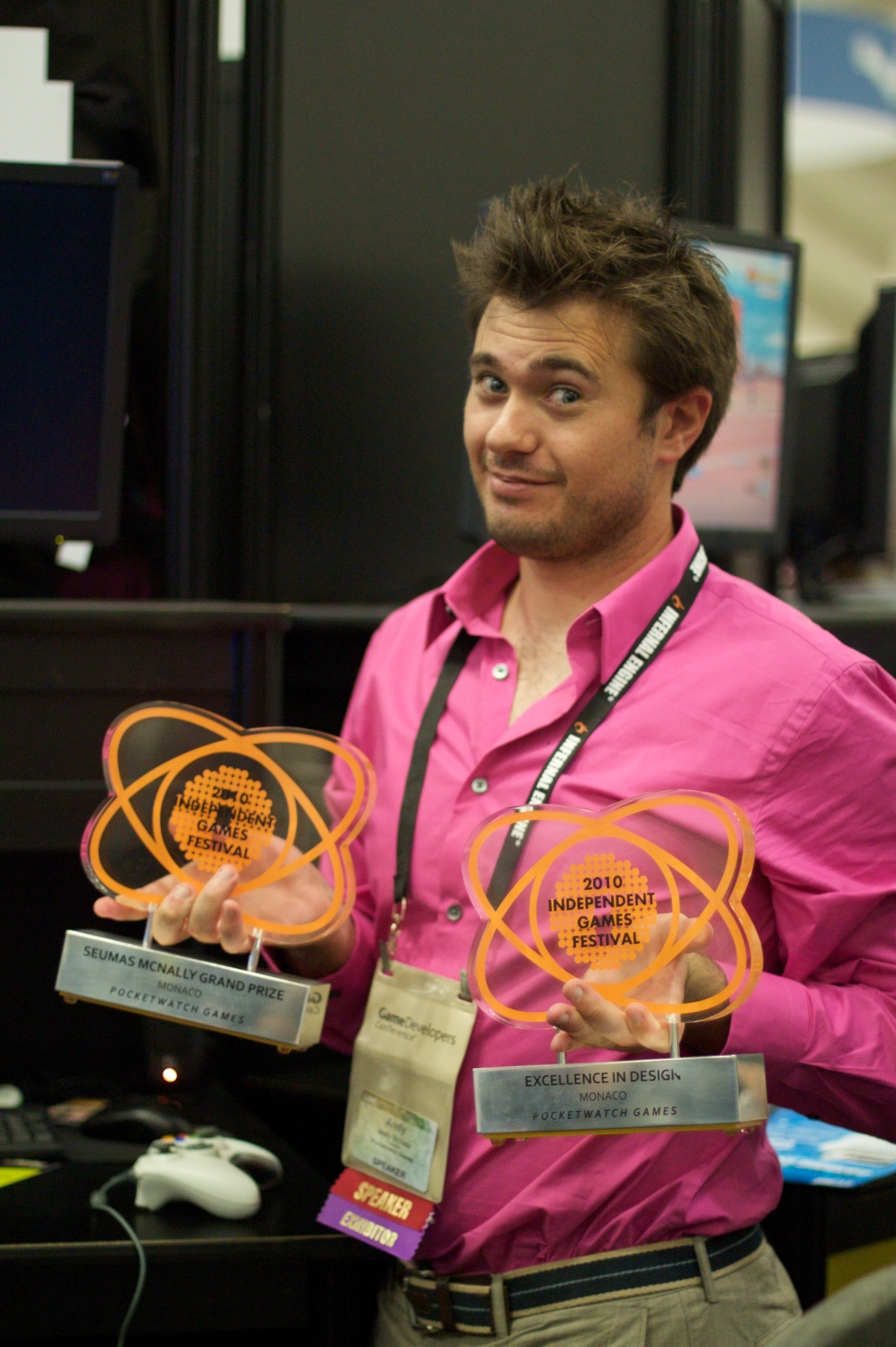
- Andy Schatz at the Independent Games Festival in 2010
- Born: March 9, 1978 (age 48); San Diego, California, U.S.
- Occupations: Video game designer CEO of Pocketwatch Games
- Known for: Pocketwatch Games
- Notable work: Monaco: What's Yours Is Mine, Tooth and Tail
- Spouse: Tierney Schatz

Andy Schatz (/ʃɑːts/; born March 9, 1978) is a video game designer based in San Diego. He began developing video games at a young age and graduated from Amherst College. After graduation, he worked for various video game development companies, including TKO Software, before founding his own independent video game development studio Pocketwatch Games in 2004. Attempting to expand his company, Schatz tried enrolling into business school; all applications were rejected. As a result, he began working on games he was passionate about. Schatz has released five video games under Pocketwatch Games: Wildlife Tycoon: Venture Africa, Venture Arctic, Monaco: What's Yours Is Mine, Tooth and Tail, and Monaco 2. His design philosophy revolves around taking inspiration from already existing media, such as films, and transforming it into a video game.

== Early life ==
Andy Schatz was born in San Diego. His father was a geophysicist, his mother a philosophy professor. At the age of four, Schatz received a Commodore 64, which sparked his desire to create video games. By the age of seven, he had designed maze games and applied BASIC scripts to make them work. When he was in seventh grade, he developed code for a game he called Servants of Darkness, a "Warlords-esque game" for the Commodore 64. His work on game development led to an invitation to the 1995 California State Science Fair. In the same year, Schatz began working on Netplay, an online gaming portal, which acted as his introduction to the video game industry. He later enrolled at Amherst College, where he graduated with a degree in Computer Science and Fine Arts.

== Career ==
=== Early career and TKO Software ===
Schatz' first job after college was at the viral marketing firm e-tractions, where he helped create a virtual Christmas snowglobe. After his work at Netplay, he worked on his first commercial release at Presto Studios, where he helped develop Star Trek: Hidden Evil (1999) as a level builder. He left Presto Studios temporarily to work for e-tractions again, only to return later to help with the AI on the Xbox Live version of Whacked! (2002). After leaving Presto Studios, Schatz moved to Santa Cruz to work for TKO Software, and in the early 2000s helped develop Medal of Honor: Allied Assault Breakthrough (2003) and GoldenEye: Rogue Agent (2004) among other games. During a time when the development team had nothing to work on, Schatz proposed a prototype of a game he had been working on described as "a house-robbing game" where players would build a home and defend it, then attempt to break into other players' homes. He sent this prototype to Microsoft, but it did not interest them.

=== 2004–2014: Pocketwatch Games' inception and Monaco ===
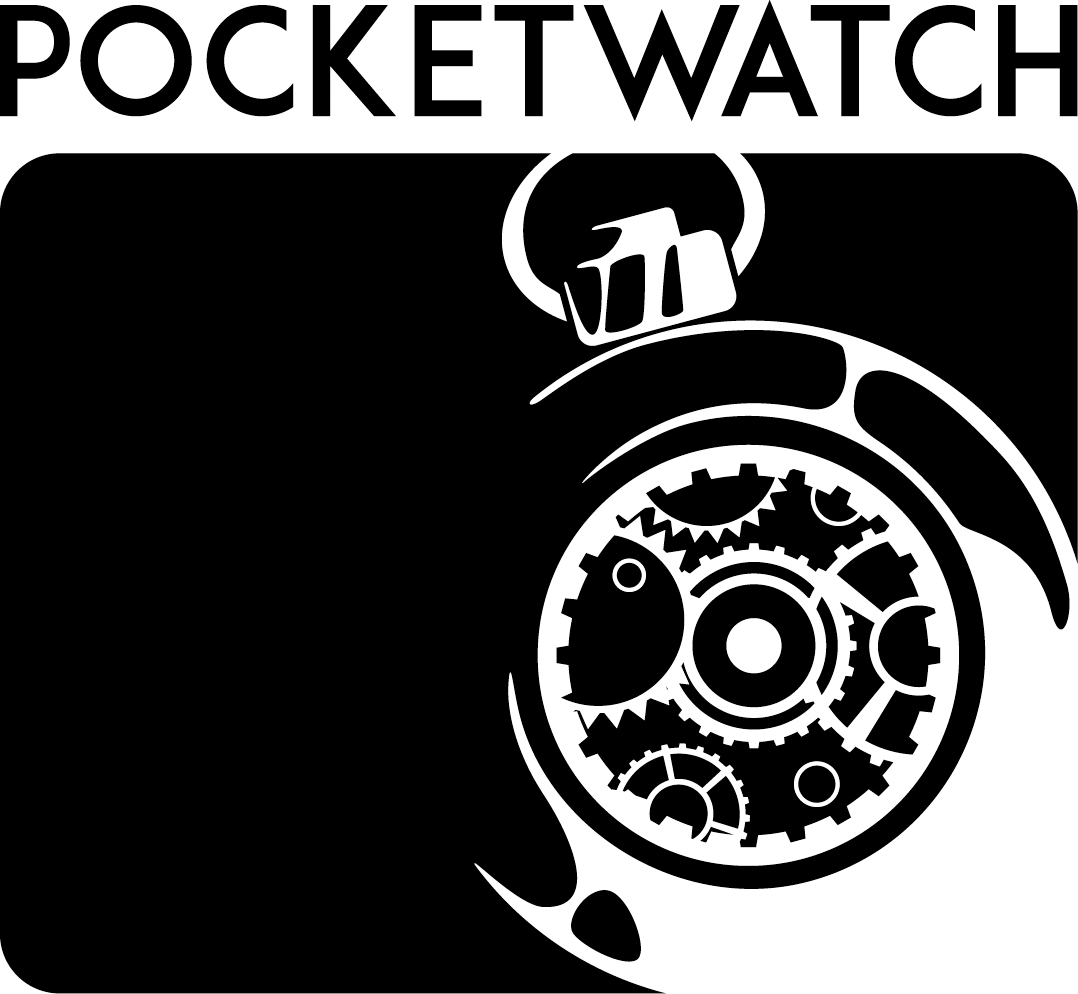
Logo for Pocketwatch Games, Schatz' independent video game studio

Schatz founded Pocketwatch Games, an independent video game development studio as a sole proprietorship in December 2004, before TKO shut down in 2005. The first game Schatz developed and released was Wildlife Tycoon: Venture Africa (2005), a tycoon game designed to appeal to the same audience as Zoo Tycoon (2001). Set in the African wilderness, the game focused on a number of themes including balancing the ecosystem, species' relationships and weather cycles. It was a success and became an Independent Games Festival (IGF) finalist helping Schatz' secure the budget for the sequel: Venture Arctic (2007). Venture Arctic had the same premise as Venture Africa. While some critics praised it, and it won Gametunnel's simulation game of the year in 2007, it had complications that players did not enjoy. As a result, it was a commercial failure compared to Venture Africa. Schatz was then hired by Jim Safka, co-founder of Match.com, to develop a flash game for Green.com. This contract slowly waned, and Schatz began to work on Venture Dinosauria. It was cancelled before its 2009 release date. Looking back Schatz said he had failed to find "a way to make it both fun and open-ended, but also a small, self-contained experience at the same time". Throughout this period Schatz wanted to expand Pocketwatch Games from a studio to a business and applied for enrollment in various business schools. He was never accepted, something he now considers "the biggest blessing of [his] entire career".

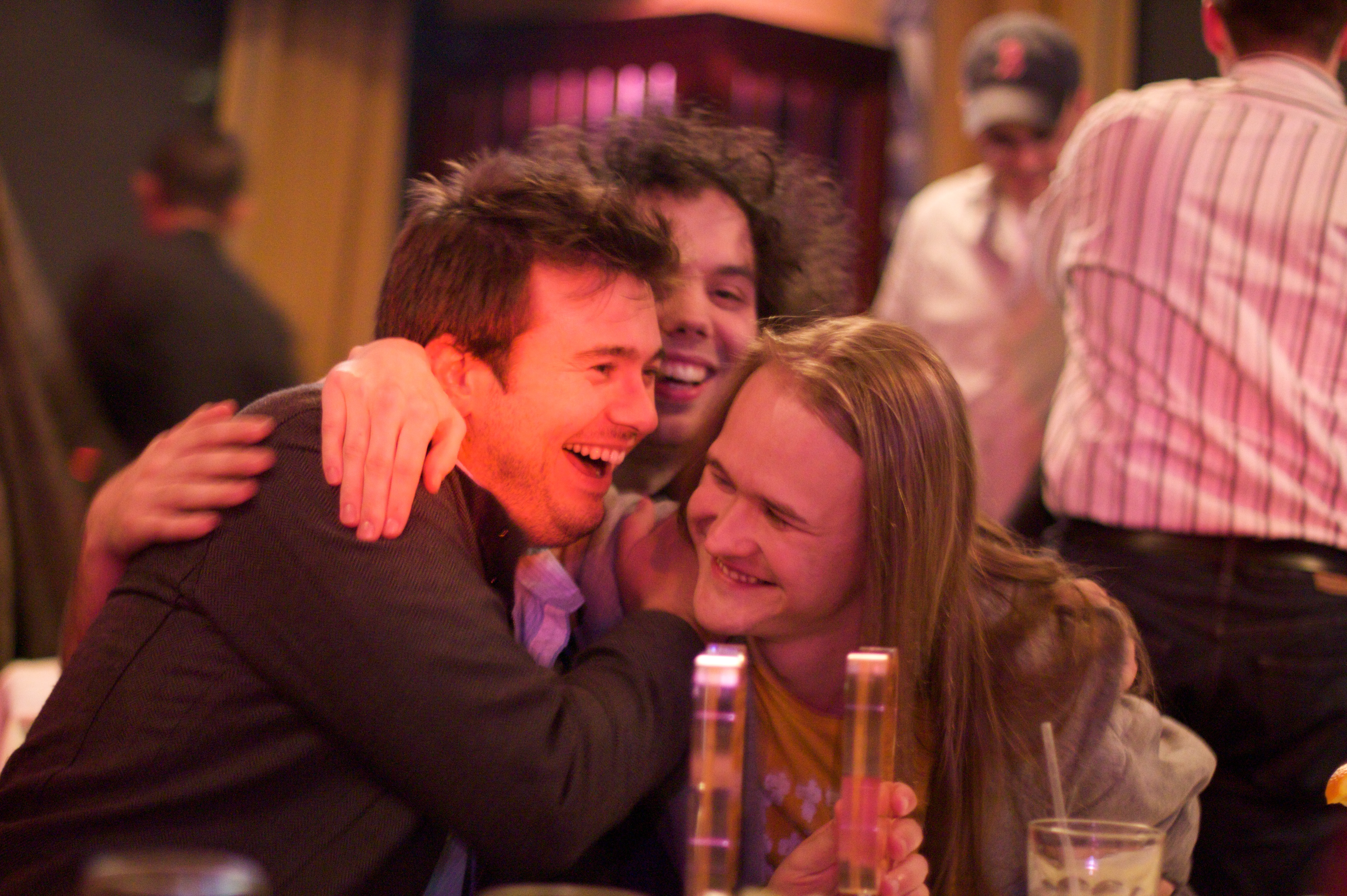
Andy Schatz and previous Seumas McNally Grand Prize winners Petri Purho and Erik Svedang pictured after Schatz' award in 2010

In 2009, Schatz, feeling despondent after the failure of Venture Dinosauria, began learning Microsoft XNA to enable him to develop games for both PC and Xbox 360. Having been rejected by business schools, he slowly discarded that idea and focused on making "whatever game [I'm] passionate about in the moment". In 2009, he was low on cash and gave himself one last chance before getting "a corporate job". He began to code a game inspired by Hitman and other games that resembled Pac-Man without the ghosts. This was the foundation of Monaco: What's Yours Is Mine (2013) and within a week Schatz had added enemies, ambience, and abilities. Shortly after, he began to look over design documents he made years earlier. After fifteen weeks of development, he had a prototype that won two IGF 2010 awards—the Seumas McNally Grand Prize and the Excellence in Design award. With the game still unfinished, these awards allowed Schatz to continue to work on what became, as Polygon described, "a magnificent return to the four-player couch madness of '90s console games". Schatz originally planned to release the game on the Xbox Live Indie Games (XBLIG) marketplace. Having received these awards, however, he changed his mind, describing XBLIG as being "a roll of the dice".

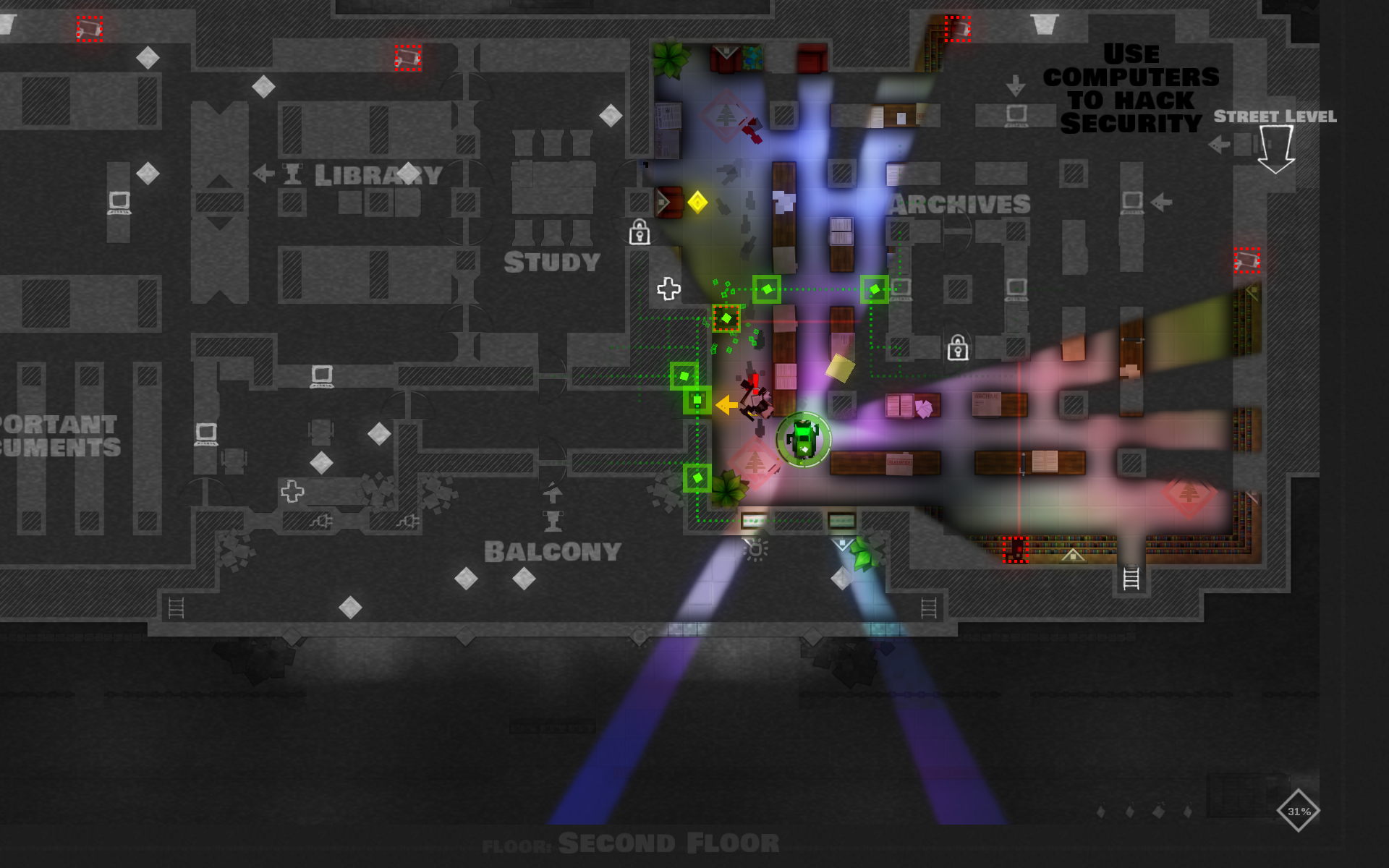
Screenshot of Monaco: What's Yours Is Mine

Soon after, Valve (the company behind Steam) and Schatz began discussing the idea of selling the game on Steam. Before this he had contacted Microsoft to discuss selling the game on the Xbox Live Arcade (XBLA). Schatz's idea was rejected by Microsoft for its lack of marketability. Microsoft gave him another chance, and with a "no-risk loan" of $100,000 from the Indie Fund, he continued to work on the game. In 2011, Microsoft rejected the game again. Around the same time, hackers had compromised the PlayStation Network databases ending Schatz' plans to port it to PlayStation 3. Despite these issues, he persisted with the idea of getting the game on consoles. It was around this time he met San Diego-born Andy Nguyen. Nguyen took an interest in Monaco: What's Yours Is Mine thanks to the accolades it had received and sent Schatz a cold call e-mail asking if he needed "a beta tester within walking distance". Because Schatz was becoming increasingly desperate for more feedback, he hired Nguyen, whose input reaffirmed his desire to work on Monaco. He later partnered with Majesco to get the game released on XBLA.

Schatz met composer Austin Wintory during Monaco's development. Initially, Schatz was using licensed music with an "old timey, silent era piano style". He contacted Wintory and proposed replacing some of the licensed music with original music. They began to discuss it in more depth as Schatz knew of Wintory's work on Thatgamecompany's Flow and Journey. Wintory eventually persuaded Schatz to use a soundtrack throughout the game. Wintory explained in an interview with IndieGames.com that Schatz was the one who created the premise for each part of Monaco's soundtrack. Schatz would present Wintory with an idea and then he would compose something. He recalled thinking: "When else am I ever going to be asked to write anything remotely like this?" This process was unlike the one he had while working with Thatgamecompany; there he would make a suggestion and it would be discussed bureaucratically.

=== 2014–present: Tooth and Tail and Monaco 2 ===
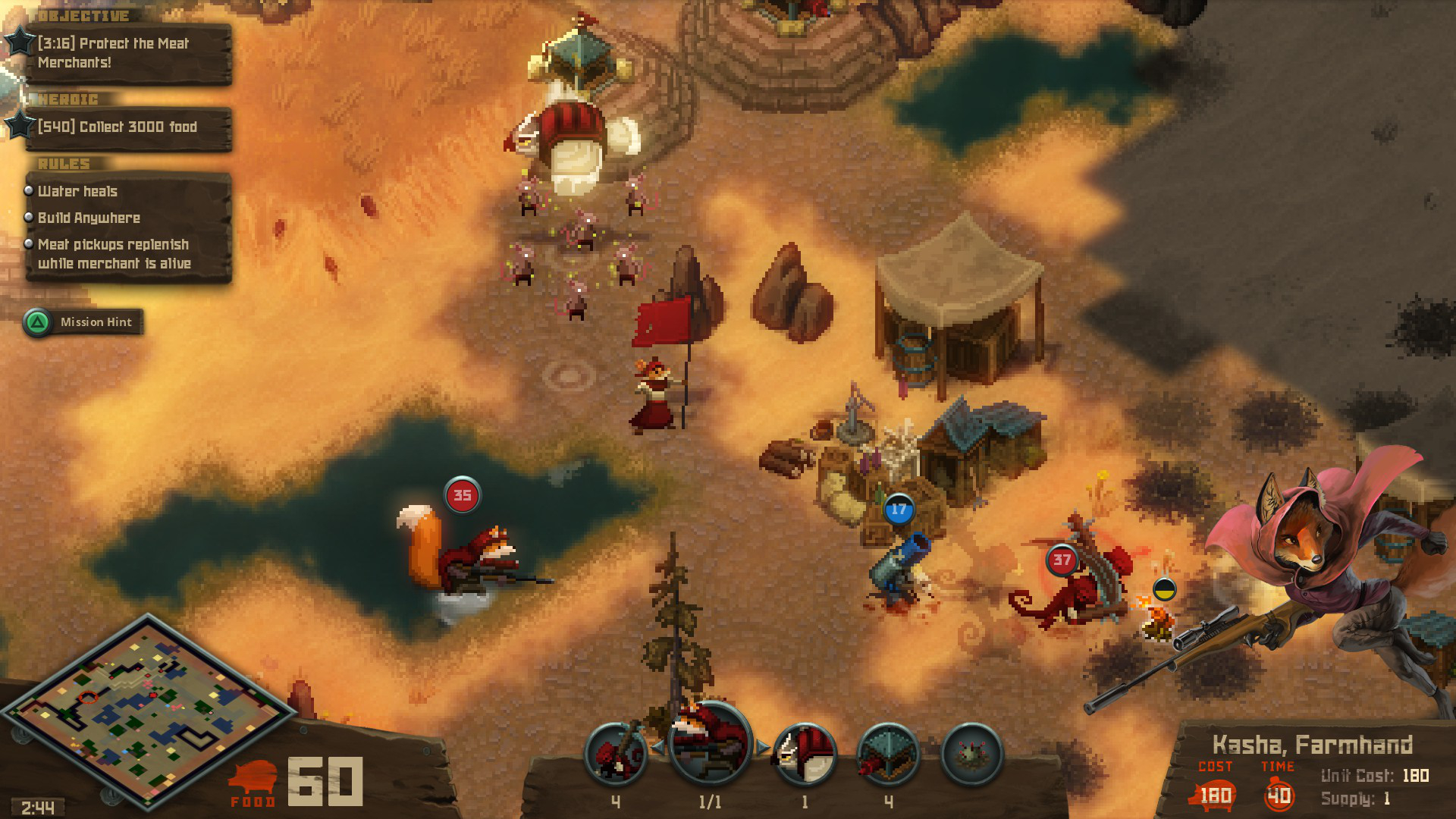
Screenshot of Tooth and Tail

Having released the final content pack for Monaco, development of Tooth and Tail (2017) began in March 2014. The premise was loosely based on a design Schatz, and college roommate Tom Wexler, had developed called Dino Drop. The game was originally codenamed Armada and was initially designed to be gamepad friendly as Schatz believed there had been no "good" real-time strategy (RTS) games that utilized them. During development Schatz noted he wanted Armada to act in a similar fashion as Monaco. He did this by taking the control system and "constraining [it] in order to make the actual, physical interaction easy to pick up without limiting the complexity of the game itself". At the Game Developers Conference, Schatz asked several people for their opinions and received positive feedback. Nothing was definite at this point including the title and theme.

The title was later changed to Lead to Fire. During this stage of its development, the team took inspiration from Blizzard Entertainment's design strategy in their ability to simplify complex mechanics. Around the same time, the game's development began being broadcast on Twitch. Schatz called it a "miniature PAX (gaming festival)", a way to discuss the development with fans. The developers were unhappy with the title Lead to Fire and changed it to Tooth and Tail about a year later. The official title is a reference to the tooth-to-tail ratio. (Note: The tooth-to-tail ratio refers to the number of military support personnel ("tail") required to support one combat soldier ("tooth").) The finalized art style was also announced around the same time, with some comparing it to a modernized version of 1990s pixel art. Schatz wrote that like the development of the art for SpyParty, "the game should look utterly shitty until it's absolutely amazing". Wintory also composed the soundtrack for Tooth and Tail.

In March 2022, Monaco 2 was announced. Schatz noted that the game features 3D graphics as opposed to Monaco's 2D top-down view, as well as incorporating procedural level generation. Monaco 2 retains the stealth and heist genres, though there is new characters introduced for players to select when playing through the game.

== Personal life ==
Schatz lives with his wife, Tierney Schatz, in San Diego.

== Design philosophy ==
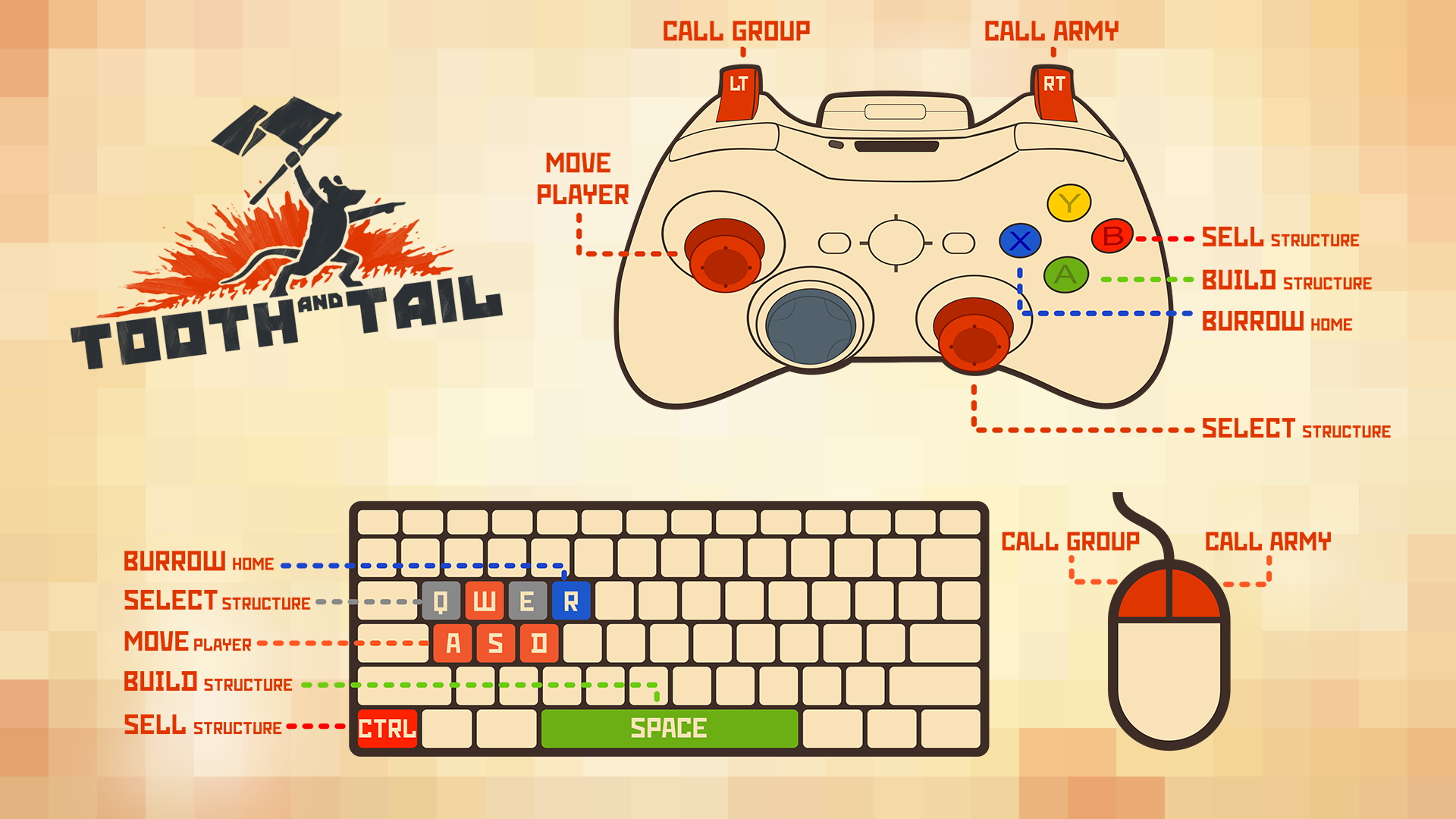
Tooth and Tail's controls, an example of Schatz' desire to make games with semi-simplistic controls

When designing video games, Schatz prefers to take inspiration from non-game concepts, such as films. From this point, he uses gaming themes to translate it into a playable video game. This trope was used heavily during Monaco's development as it was substantially influenced by the 1960 heist film Ocean's 11. This is also seen in the plot of Tooth and Tail, given it is set during the Russian Revolution. Schatz also tries to make the controls of each video game intuitive to allow the player to become more immersed in the gameplay. He mentioned Geometry Wars as being one of the games that inspired this design philosophy, saying he has "never played a game with better controls". The controls of both Monaco and Tooth and Tail are "directly inspired by the simplicity" of those of Geometry Wars. Schatz designs games that look "simple on their face but are driven by complex machinery".

== Games developed ==
Game	Release date	Platform	Refs
Wildlife Tycoon: Venture Africa	October 2005	Microsoft Windows, macOS	
Venture Arctic	May 2007	Microsoft Windows, macOS	
Venture Dinosauria	Cancelled		
Monaco: What's Yours Is Mine	April 24, 2013	Microsoft Windows, macOS, Linux, Xbox 360	—
Tooth and Tail	September 12, 2017	Microsoft Windows, macOS, Linux, PlayStation 4	
Monaco 2	April 10, 2025	Microsoft Windows, PlayStation 5, Xbox Series X/S	
