= Real Heroes: Firefighter =

2009 video game

- Developers: Epicenter Studios; Scientifically Proven Entertainment (PC, PS4); Golem Entertainment (NS); Ziggurat Interactive (PC HD re-release); Sickhead Games (XBO)
- Publishers: Conspiracy Entertainment; Zordix (3DS); Flying Tiger Entertainment (PC); Golem Entertainment (NS); 612 Entertainment (PS4); Ziggurat Interactive (XBO)
- Engine: Vicious
- Platforms: Wii; Nintendo 3DS; Microsoft Windows; PlayStation 4; Nintendo Switch; Xbox One
- Release: Wii: NA: August 4, 2009; EU: September 24, 2010; Nintendo 3DS; September 12, 2012; Microsoft Windows; March 14, 2017 January 21, 2021 (HD re-release); Nintendo Switch; November 27, 2019; PlayStation 4; February 25, 2020; Xbox One; March 31, 2022
- Genre: First-person shooter
- Mode: Single-player

Real Heroes: Firefighter is a first-person shooter video game developed by Epicenter Studios and published by Conspiracy Entertainment for the Wii in 2009. A Nintendo 3DS version was released in September 2012 by Zordix. A remastered PC version (on Steam) was released in March 2017 by Flying Tiger Entertainment, with a high definition re-release published by Ziggurat Interactive in January 2021. It was then released for Nintendo Switch and PlayStation 4 around the game's tenth anniversary, and for Xbox One by Ziggurat Interactive in March 2022.

== Gameplay ==
Firefighter is a firefighting video game that plays like a first-person shooter. The player, controlling a firefighter who the fellow firefighters refer to as Probie, uses a hose and fire extinguisher to fight flames (the former has unlimited water but limited range, while the latter can be used anywhere but has limited supply), a halligan bar to pry open locked doors and vent coverings, and a fire axe to destroy obstacles, all controlled by movement of the Wii Remote in the game's original release, which also maps the firefighter's movement style and direction to the Nunchuk's buttons and analog stick, respectively. There are also a few places in some levels where the player will need to use a rotary saw or hydraulic spreader, provided by another firefighter and not carried in the inventory, to create a hole in a wall or rip apart obstacles. The player will work with at least one other firefighter with an extinguisher in some areas though in others, he is alone, with other firefighters in his squad communicating with him through a walkie-talkie, emulated by the Wii Remote's speaker. The player has objectives to complete such as rescuing civilians or other firefighters, extinguishing all fires in an area, disabling something that causes the fire to spread, and more.

There are eight playable fire scenarios (excluding a brief tutorial level), with most of them divided into multiple acts by a loading screen, and once the player finishes an act, the next act begins immediately and the player cannot go back to the previous one until the current level is completed with all acts completed in order. Each act will have several checkpoints that play will resume from should the firefighter perish in the line of duty or fail a critical objective, and the firefighter can gradually recover health lost from hazards by moving to a safe area. Each scenario features diverse hazards, objectives and level design, as well as four secret, optional collectibles to add replay value. The four collectibles consist of three "Fire Cause Determination" pieces, represented as golden fire department badges, that will unveil the cause of the fire leading to the events of the level, as well as an item that unlocks special skins for equipment. In between levels, the player can navigate through Engine Company 13's firehouse, with all menu options presented diegetically as objects in three rooms: the recreation room, the office and the garage.

== Plot ==
A newly graduated fire academy cadet, dubbed "Probie", begins his professional firefighting career in the Los Angeles Engine Company 13 firehouse, consisting of Lieutenant Dylan Scott, Captain Tomihiro Kotaka, Engineer Ed Martin, veteran Louis "Match" Morris and younger firefighters Marc Cameron and Ezzy Vasquez. Prior to his first mission, Probie is tasked by Scott to complete a training course, with Cameron playing a victim. In the heat of yet another fire season in the city, Probie and Engine Company 13 respond to eight different fire situations in unique locations: an industrial park, a shopping mall, a neighborhood, a high-rise building, a museum, a robotics research facility, a bridge, and an amusement park. Throughout these missions, the firefighters extinguish flames and rescue citizens, including pets and fellow firefighters, left and right.

== Reception ==
Real Heroes: Firefighter received generally mixed to positive reviews for the Wii version and negative reviews for the 3DS. The Wii version has a score of 67 and the 3DS version a score of 49 on Metacritic.

=== Awards ===
Real Heroes: Firefighter was nominated by IGN for Wii Shooter of the Year.
