= Door Kickers =

2014 video game

- Developer: KillHouse Games
- Publishers: KillHouse Games; QubicGames (Switch)
- Designer: Dan Dimitrescu
- Programmers: Mihai Gosa; Catalin Saitan
- Artists: Adrian Cruceanu; Bogdan Petrica
- Platforms: Windows, Linux, iOS, Android, Switch
- Release: Windows: WW: October 20, 2014; iOS: NA: June 24, 2015; Android: NA: September 4, 2015; Switch: WW: December 26, 2020
- Genre: Real-time tactics
- Modes: Single-player, multiplayer

Door Kickers is a real-time tactics video game developed and published by Romanian indie studio KillHouse Games for Microsoft Windows on October 20, 2014, and later for iOS and Android on June 24 and September 4, 2015 respectively. A Nintendo Switch version was published by QubicGames on December 26, 2020. In Door Kickers, the player commands the SWAT team of the fictional Nowhere City Police Department in operations against criminals and terrorists.

A spin-off action side-scroller, Door Kickers: Action Squad, was released in 2017. A direct sequel with more faithful gameplay, Door Kickers 2: Task Force North, was released in early access in 2020 and fully released in 2025.

== Gameplay ==
Door Kickers combines elements of strategy games and tactical shooters. The game is played from a 2D top-down perspective, providing a full view of each level.

Gameplay is divided into three phases: deployment, planning, and engagement. In deployment, the player is given a basic overview of the level, selecting the SWAT troopers they wish to use and placing them in preset deployment positions. In planning, the game is paused, and the player is directed to plan the individual movements and actions of each trooper; the extent to which the player does this is entirely up to them, and players may freely plan basic entry, map the team's actions through the entire level, or even skip planning entirely. In engagement, the game is unpaused, and the troopers follow their assigned pathing and actions; the player can still draw paths during the engagement stage, and can switch between engagement and planning at any time.

Each trooper's pathing is created by drawing a line from a trooper or pathing circle to another location in the level. While active, troopers will automatically fire on any armed enemies that enter their line of sight cone (except Stealth troopers, who will hold fire as long as they are undetected). By default, white circles denote positioning (such as specifically facing in a certain direction), while blue icon circles denote actions (such as breaching doors, throwing grenades, or collecting evidence); if the "Colored Paths" option is enabled, each trooper's paths and circles are shown in a color specific to them. Orange icons on pathing circles or troopers denote a hold order, where the trooper will hold a position or refrain from an action until visible enemies are neutralized or no longer within their sight cone, or until ordered to continue by the player (done by clicking them or, if assigned to one, activating one of four "go orders"). Most level elements and enemies are concealed by a translucent blue or solid black fog of war effect that is removed when a trooper's sight cone passes through it.

In some missions, the player is supported by an unseen sniper that can target and instantly kill any enemy visible from their end of the screen. However, the sniper requires time to target an enemy, can unintentionally hit others in the crossfire, and usually only covers a small section of the level.

=== Team management and equipment ===
The player manages a SWAT team of ten troopers, who can have their classes, weapons, armor, utilities, gear, and character customized. As the team completes missions they will level up, both as a team and individually, improving their individual skills in accuracy, reaction time, and action speed. Stars earned from completing missions can be spent on new weapons and equipment, while doctrine points earned from leveling up the team can be used in a skill tree to improve their overall proficiency.

There are five available classes that can be assigned to troopers: Pointman, fast and quick but lacking a primary weapon slot, only armed with handguns; Assaulter, basic and all-rounded, armed with rifles and submachine guns; Breacher, specializing in breaching and close-quarters combat, armed with shotguns; Stealth, able to stealthily flank and kill enemies with suppressed weapons, but otherwise just a weaker Assaulter; and Shield, carrying a ballistic shield capable of blocking bullets, but also very slow, unable to carry equipment or utilities, and only armed with handguns.

Equipment includes flashbangs that stun those in their detonation radius, stinger grenades that can kill or daze depending on proximity, breaching charges that destroy any door but can kill those on the other side, lockpick machines that hasten lockpicking, and tasers that can be used to non-lethally stun and arrest suspects. Utilities include spy cameras to peek through doors without opening them, sledgehammers to quickly breach reinforced doors, bolt cutters to break locks and gates, and breaching kits that combine both but greatly decrease mobility. Body armor improves survivability for specific sides of the trooper's body at the cost of mobility.

=== Campaigns and missions ===
Door Kickers features six main campaigns, each with a certain number of missions and a loose plot involving the NCPD's efforts to counter organized crime and terrorism. Also available are single missions, which are missions that are not tied to a campaign and can be completed at the player's own leisure. Each mission has a rating of three stars, awarded to the player based on the methods they used to complete the mission.

In campaigns, any sustained casualties are kept until completion (so if a trooper is injured, they will remain injured for that playthrough). If a trooper is killed in a campaign, they are permanently lost, with their stats and rank reset and their character replaced with a new game-generated character. Single missions lack this mechanic, meaning killed troopers will be retained.

There are eight mission varieties: "Clear Hostiles", where all enemies in the level must be neutralized; "Hostage Rescue", similar to Clear Hostiles but featuring rescuable civilian hostages; "Bomb Defusal", where a time bomb must be defused before it can detonate; "Stop Execution", essentially Hostage Rescue but with enemies that can execute hostages if not stopped within a certain time frame; "Protect the VIP", where a controllable VIP must be protected from enemy assassins; "Arrest Warrant", where a wanted suspect must be apprehended; "Dope Raid", where evidence must be recovered before suspects can destroy them; and "Robbery in Progress", where robbers must be stopped before they can reach an escape point.

Door Kickers features a level editor and full modding support, allowing players to create their own levels and download other user-created levels or mods through the Steam Workshop. There is also a level generator, though the maps and options available are limited.

== Reception ==
Reception

Aggregate score
Aggregator	Score
Metacritic	82/100

Review scores
Publication	Score
IGN	9/10
PC Gamer (US)	8.4/10

Door Kickers was positively received by critics. Rock Paper Shotgun stated that "Door Kickers is a smashing top-down tactical masterclass, with enough missions to shake a nightstick at, randomised enemy placements to add further variety, and a bundled level editor allows devious designers to create their own maps and missions … Door Kickers is a complete package of planning, panicking and policing". Indie Statik proclaimed that "...it's a thing of beauty and manages to capture the planning and satisfying execution of more complex strategy games, as well as the gung-ho and the popping-off of growly man in military shooters. ... It's probably the best man-shootery game I've played in years". In a Giant Bomb Quick Look, Matt Rorie praised it and said he enjoyed the game.

Rock Paper Shotgun awarded Door Kickers their Best Tactics of 2014 award.

== Sequels ==
=== Door Kickers: Action Squad ===
Door Kickers: Action Squad is a spin-off of Door Kickers, created on behalf of KillHouse Games by another studio, pixelshard. Action Squad was released on early access on November 20, 2017. Full release was on September 10, 2018 for Windows PCs. It received console ports to Nintendo Switch, PlayStation 4, and Xbox One on October 28, 2019. A port for the iOS was released on April 2, 2020. The game received generally positive reviews.

Door Kickers: Action Squad strays from the series' traditional top-down gameplay in favor of a less-serious side-scrolling action game, featuring characters loosely based on the classes from Door Kickers.

=== Door Kickers 2: Task Force North ===
Door Kickers 2: Task Force North, a direct sequel to Door Kickers, was released through Steam Early Access on November 3, 2020, and fully released on February 10, 2025. While the game was initially planned for a Q4 2016 release, the game received substantial delays and was trapped in development hell for several years.

Door Kickers 2 departs from the law enforcement setting of the first game and is set in the fictional country of Nowheraki during special forces counterinsurgency operations in the country. Door Kickers 2 features improved weapon variety, equipment, AI, and various new gameplay features in a 3D environment. Many features that were criticized in Door Kickers were improved in the sequel, such as the stealth mechanics.
