= Epicenter Studios =

Defunct American video game company

Epicenter Studios, LLC
- Company type: Privately held company
- Industry: Video games
- Founded: March 2007
- Founders: Bryan Jury
- Headquarters: Sherman Oaks, California, USA
- Products: Critter Round-Up; Real Heroes: Firefighter; Rock of the Dead
- Website: Epicenter Studios

Epicenter Studios, based in Sherman Oaks, California, was a video game developer founded by talent from, among other titles, the commercially successful, critically acclaimed Call of Duty franchise. Epicenter Studios released its first title Critter Round-Up (Animal Panic in Japan) at the Japanese Nintendo WiiWare launch on March 25, 2008. Critter Round-up was the only game in the group developed by a US team.

== Games developed ==
Year	Title	Platform(s)				
Year	Title	Wii	3DS	PS3	X360	Win
2008	Critter Round-Up	Yes	No	No	No	No
2009	Real Heroes: Firefighter	Yes	Yes	No	No	Yes
2010	Rock of the Dead	No	No	Yes	Yes	No
