= Wildlife Tycoon: Venture Africa =

2005 video game

- Developer: Pocketwatch Games
- Publishers: Pocketwatch Games, MumboJumbo
- Designer: Andy Schatz
- Series: World Ventures
- Engine: Torque Game Engine
- Platforms: Windows, Mac OS X
- Release: NA: October 2005; (v1.0)
- Genre: Simulation
- Mode: Single-player

Wildlife Tycoon: Venture Africa is a simulation video game set in Africa. Players create and control African animals such as lions, elephants, zebras in this strategy game. To succeed, the player must discover the unique behaviors of each species and build food and water sources to suit them. They must plan their ecosystem well so that it can help both predator and prey achieve balance in the wild. The player can also select any animal and teach it about far away food sources, or select a predator to take down a herbivore.

Venture Africa was published by casual game publisher, MumboJumbo, and is also sold online from the Pocketwatch Games website as well as a number of other gaming portals.

The title was developed in 10 months for a total of USD8,000, and sold about 65,000 copies. Andy Schatz, CEO and founder of Pocketwatch Games, designed, programmed, produced and contributed art to the game. A team of seven remote contractors provided the rest of the art and media for the game.

== Awards and reception ==
- Independent Games Festival 2006

- Grand Prize Finalist

- Slamdance Guerilla Gamemaker Competition 2006

- Grand Prize Finalist

- Indie Games Con 2005

- Most Innovative Runner Up
- Best Overall Runner Up

Hyper's Tim Henderson commends the game for its "simple interface" as well as "great life and death balance". However, he criticises the game for its "tutorial [which] is a little vague and no camera rotation".

== Legacy ==
Venture Africa spawned a sequel called Venture Arctic. Venture Arctic was released on the 26 May 2007 and has approximately double the number of animals compared to Venture Africa. Venture Dinosauria was cancelled before its 2009 release date.
