= Tooth-to-tail ratio =

Proportion of fighting force to support elements

The tooth-to-tail ratio (T3R), in military jargon, is the number of military personnel it takes to supply and support ("tail") each combat soldier ("tooth"). While both "tooth" and "tail" soldiers may find themselves in combat or other life-threatening situations, and both may spend much time in non-combat duties, "tooth" soldiers are those whose primary function is to engage in combat. The ratio is not a specific measure but rather a general indication of a force's might in relation to the resources it devotes to supply, upkeep, and logistics. It may be measured for an entire national military, a single branch, a theater of operations, or down to individual formations.

US Army tooth-to-tail 1917-2005
Conflict	Combat proportion (%)	T3R (ratio)
WW1	28	1 : 2.6
WW2	19	1 : 4.3
Korea	7.5	1 : 12.3
Vietnam	7.2	1 : 12.9
Cold War (1974)	6.5	1 : 14.4
Gulf War (1991)	17	1 : 4.9
Iraq 2005	11	1 : 8.1

A force's tooth-to-tail ratio is often inversely related to its technological capabilities and subsequently its overall power. While a force with a high tooth-to-tail ratio will have more personnel devoted to combat, these soldiers will lack the support provided by the tail. Such support includes the logistics and communication infrastructure on which modern forces depend. A force with a higher tooth-to-tail ratio may have more combat troops, but each will be less effective.

The tooth-to-tail ratio of the US military has varied widely in its different conflicts.
