= Game program =

Game program may refer to:

- Programme (booklet), booklet available at live events, including sporting events
- Game programming, software development of video games
