= Once Upon a Time in Venice =

2017 American film by Mark Cullen

- Theatrical release poster
- Directed by: Mark Cullen
- Written by: Mark Cullen; Robb Cullen
- Produced by: Mark Cullen; Robb Cullen; Nicolas Chartier; Zev Foreman; Laura Ford
- Starring: Bruce Willis; Jason Momoa; John Goodman; Thomas Middleditch; Famke Janssen; Adam Goldberg; Jessica Gomes
- Cinematography: Amir Mokri
- Edited by: Matt Deizel
- Music by: Jeff Cardoni
- Production companies: Voltage Pictures; Cullen Brothers Films
- Distributed by: RLJ Entertainment
- Release date: June 16, 2017
- Running time: 94 minutes
- Country: United States
- Language: English
- Box office: $855,888

Once Upon a Time in Venice is a 2017 American crime comedy film directed by Mark Cullen in his directorial debut, who co-wrote with his brother Robb. The film stars Bruce Willis, Jason Momoa, John Goodman, Thomas Middleditch, Famke Janssen, Adam Goldberg, and Jessica Gomes. The film follows private detective Steve Ford (Willis) and his assistant (Middleditch) as they face many tasks, notably the capture of Ford's dog by a gang leader named Spyder (Momoa).

Once Upon a Time in Venice was released in a limited theatrical release and through video on demand on June 16, 2017, by RLJ Entertainment. The film received negative reviews from critics.

== Plot ==
In Venice, Los Angeles, private investigator Steve Ford gets his assistant John to locate a young woman, Nola, that he was hired to find, only for Ford to have sex with her. This results in him being chased by her brothers, who had hired him. He hides at his friend Tino's pizza place, and in return, agrees to steal back Tino's stolen car from a gang leader named Spyder. He disguises himself as a pizza man to get into Spyder's house, and barely gets the car out alive.

Ford juggles time with his beloved dog, his sister-in-law Katey and her daughter, and his best friend Dave Phillips, who is going through a divorce. He also has a new job from real estate salesman Lew the Jew, regarding lewd graffiti art on his buildings in exchange for his childhood home, which Lew had bought. Spyder's clients robs Katey's home, taking the dog too. Ford asks only for the dog back; Spyder says he will return the dog in exchange for a couple thousand dollars to pay for the damage Ford caused his home with the earlier car theft fiasco.

Ford sends John to stake out the mysterious graffiti artist. John runs into Nola, forming a romance. After getting the cash from Yuri, a loan shark, Ford pays Spyder, only for Spyder to inform him that his ex-girlfriend Lupe stole the dog along with Spyder's cocaine. Spyder makes a deal with Ford, asking him to get the cocaine back; in exchange, he will return the money Ford paid him for the dog. After tracking Lupe to a motel, Ford breaks into her room but is subdued by a transvestite before escaping. Ford and John uncover the graffiti artist's identity and find out he was hired by rivals of Lew.

Ford recruits Phillips to confront Lew's rivals and close Lew's case. They learn that Lupe had sold the cocaine to a gang led by Prince, and infiltrate his club to steal it back. Fearing their exchange is a set-up, Ford and Phillips come armed and prepared to Spyder's house. After being caught in a standoff, Spyder follows through on the deal with little fanfare, parting with Ford on good terms.

After receiving his childhood house from Lew, Ford gives it to his sister and niece. Unfortunately, John is kidnapped by Prince, who is looking for revenge on Ford. When they learn where Ford is, they head out for him, leaving John tied up.

== Cast ==
- Bruce Willis as Steve Ford, a Los Angeles private detective whose dog is stolen by a gang.
- Jason Momoa as Spyder, a drug lord who forces Steve to do some jobs for the safety of his dog.
- John Goodman as Dave Phillips, Steve's best friend.
- Thomas Middleditch as John, an assistant in his operation to Steve.
- Famke Janssen as Katey Ford, Steve's sister-in-law.
- Adam Goldberg as Lew the Jew, a real estate developer
- Jessica Gomes as Nola
- Stephanie Sigman as Lupe, Spyder's girlfriend.
- Wood Harris as Prince
- Ken Davitian as Yuri
- Victor Ortiz as Chuy
- Elisabeth Röhm as Anne Phillips, Dave's ex
- Adrian Martinez as Tino, the owner of a local pizza store who wants to help Steve.
- Christopher McDonald as Mr. Carter
- Ron Funches as Mocha
- Sol Rodríguez as Consuela
- Kal Penn as Rajeesh, a grocery store clerk.
- Emily Robinson as Taylor

== Production ==
By May 16, 2015, Bruce Willis was cast to star in a comedy film playing a Los Angeles private detective whose dog is stolen by a gang. Mark and Robb Cullen penned the script with the former making his directorial debut, and they would also produce the film along with Nicolas Chartier, Zev Foreman, and Laura Ford, while Voltage Pictures financing and selling the film at Cannes. On June 16, 2015, Jason Momoa, Thomas Middleditch and Famke Janssen joined the cast of the film, Momoa to play the gang leader who forces Willis' character to do some jobs for his dog, Middleditch to play Willis' assistant in his operation, while Janssen would play Willis' sister-in-law. Later on June 30, 2015, John Goodman, Stephanie Sigman, Adrian Martinez, Kal Penn, and Emily Robinson round out the remaining cast of the film, Goodman playing Willis' best friend, Sigman playing Momoa's character's girlfriend, Martinez playing the owner of a local pizza store who wants to help Willis' character, while Penn would play a grocery store clerk. On July 13, 2015, Adam Goldberg was set to play Lou the Jew in the film. Next day on July 14, 2015, four more joined the cast of the film, including Tyga, Ken Davitian, David Arquette, and Victor Ortiz.

Actor Ralph Garman was meant to play a role in the movie, but he revealed on his Hollywood Babble-On podcast that his character was written out of the film when Willis refused to shoot a scene between them. The Cullen brothers offered him another role, and again, Willis declined to shoot the scene. The next day, the producers of the film stated that the scene needed to be cut, leaving Garman without an appearance in the film. The story mirrored that of his co-host, director Kevin Smith, who had similar stories of Willis' behaviour during the filming of Cop Out.

Principal photography began on June 29, 2015, in Venice, Los Angeles. The film was shooting under the working title Going Under.

== Release ==
On April 4, 2017, RLJ Entertainment acquired distribution rights to the film. It was released in a limited release and through video on demand on June 16, 2017. It was released in the UK as L.A. Vengeance.

== Reception ==
=== Box office ===
Once Upon a Time in Venice grossed $855,888 in the international box office; countries include United Arab Emirates, Hungary, Turkey, Portugal, South Africa, Romania, Ukraine, Lithuania, Bulgaria, Slovenia, Greece, Iceland, Russia, and South Korea.

=== Critical response ===
On the review aggregator website Rotten Tomatoes, 21% of 38 critics' reviews are positive, with an average rating of 4.1/10. The website's consensus reads: "Once Upon a Time in Venice has a little more of a spark than typical late-period Bruce Willis tough guy movies, but it's still a steep, disappointing tumble from his best work." Metacritic, which uses a weighted average, assigned the film a score of 28 out of 100, based on 9 critics, indicating "generally unfavorable" reviews.
