= MonoGame =

Free and open-source C# framework for game development

- Developer: MonoGame Foundation
- Release: December 2, 2009; 16 years ago
- Stable release: 3.8.5.1 / August 14, 2026; 2 months ago
- Written in: C#
- Platform: Microsoft Windows, macOS, Linux, Android, iOS, iPadOS, PlayStation 4, PlayStation 5, Xbox One, Xbox Series X/S, Nintendo Switch, Nintendo Switch 2
- Type: Application framework
- License: Microsoft Public License (some portions under the MIT License)
- Website: monogame.net
- Repository: github.com/MonoGame/MonoGame

MonoGame is a free and open source software framework for developing video games in C#. It began as a way to bring existing XNA-based Windows and Windows Phone games to platforms Microsoft did not officially support, and is now also used to build new games from scratch. It is a code-first framework: it provides libraries for graphics, audio, input and content management but no built-in editor, so developers choose their own tools. It supports desktop platforms (Windows, macOS and Linux), mobile platforms (Android, iOS and iPadOS) and, for developers authorized by the platform holders, the PlayStation 4, PlayStation 5, Xbox One, Xbox Series X/S, Nintendo Switch and Nintendo Switch 2. It implements the Microsoft XNA 4 application programming interface (API). Games built with MonoGame include Bastion, Celeste, Barotrauma, Fez, and Stardew Valley.

MonoGame originated in December 2009 as a port of XNA to the iPhone, and was renamed and moved to GitHub in 2011. After Microsoft ended development of XNA in 2013, MonoGame continued as an independent open-source project, later adding 3D rendering and support for consoles including PlayStation 4, PlayStation 5, Xbox One, Xbox Series X/S, and Nintendo Switch. Since September 2023, the project has been owned and stewarded by the MonoGame Foundation, a US-based non-profit organization that funds development through individual and corporate donations rather than subscription fees, royalties, or licensing costs. The framework's source code is distributed under the Microsoft Public License, with the exception of a few portions of the code.

MonoGame's long-established targets render graphics using DirectX on Windows and OpenGL elsewhere. Version 3.8.5, released in July 2026 after a public preview that began in late 2025, added a new native backend and two targets built on the newer Vulkan and DirectX 12 graphics APIs. Because MonoGame is an independent reimplementation of the XNA API rather than a copy of Microsoft's original source code, and because it has extended and modified that API over time rather than reproducing it exactly, developer Ethan Lee forked the project in 2013 into a stricter, accuracy-focused alternative called FNA. MonoGame is also used in academic and hobbyist settings to teach fundamental game programming concepts.

== History ==
=== Origins in XNA (2004–2010) ===
Microsoft announced XNA, a set of tools and a managed runtime for game development, at the Game Developers Conference in March 2004, with a public preview of the toolset following in 2006. XNA became a popular platform for small and independent Windows and Xbox 360 developers and was used to create games such as Bastion and Terraria, but Microsoft never extended official support to mobile devices. This gap led to independent porting efforts: in 2009, Bill Reiss released SilverSprite, an open-source 2D framework for Windows Phone inspired by XNA, and José Antonio Leal de Farias combined code from SilverSprite and the community project Mono.XNA to create XNA Touch, a port of XNA aimed at the iPhone, released in December 2009. Several games built with XNA Touch reached the Apple App Store in 2010.

=== Formation of MonoGame (2011–2013) ===
In 2011, XNA Touch was renamed MonoGame and moved to GitHub, adding support for Android, Mac, Linux and OpenGL on Windows; Dominique Louis took over as the project's full-time lead. MonoGame 2.0, the first official release, followed in October 2011 with a downloadable version 0.7 that had been available from CodePlex. These early versions supported only 2D sprite-based games; the last purely 2D release was version 2.5.1 in June 2012. Support for DirectX 11, Windows 8 and Windows Phone 8 was added later in 2012, the same year the MonoGame team was invited to present at Microsoft's Build conference.

In February 2013, Microsoft confirmed that it had no plans to release further versions of XNA, effectively ending official development of the toolkit that MonoGame reimplemented. MonoGame's Dominique Louis said the decision left thousands of XNA developers without an official path forward, and the project pledged to continue supporting them. Ouya console support was added to MonoGame in January 2013, and MonoGame 3.0 followed later that month, introducing 3D rendering support for the first time. Over the following months, the team extended the framework further beyond a strict XNA 4 reimplementation, adding features such as RenderTarget3D, support for multiple GameWindows, and a new cross-platform command line content building tool.

=== 3D expansion and console support (2014–2022) ===
The first MonoGame titles on PlayStation 4 — TowerFall Ascension, Transistor and Mercenary Kings — were released in 2014, the year Tom Spilman and Steve Williams took over stewardship of the project and official PlayStation 4 developer access opened to all Sony-registered studios. Support for further consoles followed: MonoGame for PlayStation Vita was made available to Sony developers in July 2016 and MonoGame for Nintendo Switch to Nintendo developers in July 2017. MonoGame 3.7 was released in September 2018 and MonoGame 3.8 in August 2020, and PlayStation 5 support followed in July 2022 alongside MonoGame 3.8.1.

=== Nonprofit foundation and recent development (2023–present) ===
In September 2023, in the wake of the controversy over Unity's policy changes, the MonoGame team announced plans to move the project's assets into a new non-profit foundation to secure its long-term governance and funding, with the stated aim of keeping the framework open source and free to use in every scenario, including on consoles. The resulting MonoGame Foundation was formed on September 29, 2023, and was recognized as a 501(c)(3) tax-exempt organization, retroactive to its founding, in October 2024.

MonoGame 3.8.2, released in August 2024 as the first release under the Foundation, moved the framework and its content tool to .NET 8 and dropped support for the Universal Windows Platform. Versions 3.8.3 and 3.8.4 followed in April and June 2025. Public previews of 3.8.5 began in late 2025, and the full release arrived on July 15, 2026. It introduced a new native backend (a single C/C++ library supplying platform-specific implementations, reducing the framework's dependence on third-party C# wrapper libraries such as OpenTK and SharpDX), two new targets, DesktopVK (using Vulkan) and WindowsDX12 (using Direct3D 12), a new code-based Content Builder, and development and runtime packages for ARM64 systems, including low-powered hardware such as the Raspberry Pi. A bug-fix release, 3.8.5.1, followed on August 14, 2026.

In July 2026, the Foundation announced the MonoGame Hub, a tool for creating and managing MonoGame projects from official templates, with early access initially limited to donors at or above a set contribution tier. MonoGame continues to be used by indie developers for cross-platform 2D and 3D games, including recent releases on Steam and modern consoles.

The project's published roadmap schedules 3.8.6 for the third quarter of 2026, focused on stabilizing the new desktop targets and modernizing the storage API; 3.8.7 for the fourth quarter, adding a new shader system and a native web platform and bringing the Hub to public release; and 3.8.8 for the first quarter of 2027, adding a new font system and native video support. A later 4.x series is described as the last to enforce the original XNA APIs, with a 5.x series intended to move beyond them.

=== Release history ===
The Foundation's history timeline lists the following MonoGame releases.

MonoGame release history
Version	Release date
2.0	October 28, 2011
3.0	January 21, 2013
3.2	April 7, 2014
3.4	April 15, 2015
3.5.1	March 16, 2016
3.6	March 16, 2017
3.7	September 23, 2018
3.8	August 10, 2020
3.8.1	July 25, 2022
3.8.2	August 16, 2024
3.8.3	April 5, 2025
3.8.4	June 2, 2025
3.8.5	July 15, 2026
3.8.5.1	August 14, 2026

== Features ==
=== Programming model ===
MonoGame follows XNA in taking a code-first approach. It supplies building blocks for games, game engines and development tools, but includes no built-in editor or visual interface, leaving developers to assemble their own working environment. The framework and its documentation use C#, but because MonoGame is a .NET library it can also be used from other .NET languages, including F# and Visual Basic; the documentation notes that community support for these languages may be limited. Games can be developed in editors including Visual Studio, Visual Studio Code and JetBrains Rider.

The framework's libraries cover graphics, input, audio, content processing and mathematics. Graphics support includes sprite batching for 2D games, 3D rendering and shaders; input handling covers keyboards, mice, gamepads and touchscreens; the audio system plays sound effects and music; and a math library provides common mathematical operations for games.

=== Content pipeline ===
Content management and distribution follow the ContentManager model inherited from XNA 4, letting developers build and package game assets, such as textures, models, and audio, for their target platforms. Assets are listed in a content project (a .mgcb file), which can be edited in the graphical MGCB Editor and compiled by the MonoGame Content Builder (MGCB) command-line tool into binary .xnb files that the game loads at run time. Built-in importers and processors handle common file types, and developers can write custom ones as they could in XNA; the editor can also import existing XNA content projects. Shaders written in a supported shader language (HLSL or GLSL) are preprocessed into a common effect format used by MonoGame.

The 3.8.5 release introduced a new Content Builder, in which a game's assets are built by a C# project maintained alongside the game rather than described in a data file; it is intended to replace the separate MGCB tool and MGCB Editor.

=== Platform support ===
MonoGame's public repository covers desktop and mobile platforms, while the code that supports console platforms is held in private repositories that are available only to authorized console developers. A developer first joins the platform holder's program, such as Nintendo's developer program, the PlayStation Partners program or Microsoft's ID@Xbox program, and then requests access to the MonoGame console repositories through it. The Foundation cannot grant access without the platform holder's approval because of the non-disclosure requirements that each holder imposes.

== Architecture ==
MonoGame implements the XNA 4 API across each platform it supports. On Windows, its established target renders graphics through DirectX using SharpDX, a .NET wrapper library for DirectX. On non-Microsoft platforms it instead uses OpenGL, accessed through the OpenTK library; mobile builds that once relied on the Xamarin runtime have moved onto its successor, .NET MAUI, after Microsoft ended support for Xamarin on May 1, 2024.

Version 3.8.5 (2026) began a move to a new native backend: a single C/C++ dynamic library that provides the platform-specific implementations, so that the C# side of the framework can stay platform-independent and native code can be shared across targets. The new DesktopVK target, which uses SDL2, Vulkan and FAudio, is intended to eventually replace DesktopGL with a single build for Windows, macOS and Linux; its Vulkan code was originally written for Google Stadia. The WindowsDX12 target builds on Direct3D 12 code first created as a bounty for Xbox One and Xbox Series support; it is compatible with Microsoft's Game Development Kit (GDK), allowing releases through the Microsoft Store or PC Game Pass, and the developers expect it to replace the Direct3D 11 target within a few years.

MonoGame's graphics capabilities come from OpenGL, OpenGL ES, DirectX, Vulkan or Direct3D 12 depending on platform. Since MonoGame version 3, the framework has targeted OpenGL 2, which added support for shaders and more advanced rendering; earlier releases such as version 2.5 used the more limited OpenGL 1.x.

== Governance and funding ==
MonoGame is owned by the MonoGame Foundation, a non-profit corporation formed in Texas in September 2023 to direct the framework's future and promote game-development education. Under the Foundation's bylaws, the project is overseen by a volunteer board of between three and eleven directors, who are elected by the sitting board itself rather than by a wider membership; the bylaws designate the chair as chief executive officer and the president as executive director. As of September 2026, the board has seven members: president Dean Ellis; chairman Dominique Louis, who became MonoGame's full-time project lead in 2011; corporate secretary Simon Jackson; treasurer Tom Spilman; and directors Christopher Whitley, Garrick Campsey and Vic Chelaru. Marko Jeremic, a former chairman, and Thomas Altenburger are listed as former board members. The Foundation publishes its bylaws, its roadmap and the records of its monthly board meetings.

The Foundation is funded through individual and corporate donations, including via GitHub, Patreon and PayPal, which support framework development, documentation, community events and general project infrastructure. In December 2025, it announced that ConcernedApe, the developer of Stardew Valley, had joined its existing premier sponsors.

== Licensing ==
MonoGame's source code is distributed under the Microsoft Public License, except for a few portions of the code. The project's license file also includes the MIT License for portions of the code copyrighted by the Mono.Xna Team, and third-party libraries used by the framework remain under their own licenses. The Foundation states that MonoGame remains free to use, with no subscription model, royalty payments, licensing costs or runtime fees. Platform-specific code for consoles is not part of the public repository and is available only to authorized console developers.

== Usage ==
=== Video games ===
MonoGame was originally created to bring XNA-style development to platforms Microsoft did not officially support, and it has since been used as the underlying framework for numerous independently developed games, first in 2D and later in 3D. Notable titles built with MonoGame include Bastion, Fez, Celeste, Stardew Valley, Terraria and Streets of Rage 4. A more complete, community-maintained list of games known to use the framework follows:

Game	Year	Developer	Publisher	Notes
After the Collapse	2022	Anarkis Gaming		
Apotheon	2015	Alientrap		PlayStation 4 version
Axiom Verge	2015	Thomas Happ Games LLC		
Axiom Verge 2	2021	Thomas Happ Games		
Barotrauma	2023	Undertow Games	Daedalic Entertainment	
Bastion	2011	Supergiant Games	Warner Bros. Interactive Entertainment	Supergiant released an open-source MonoGame branch for the game
Bleed	2012	Bootdisk Revolution		
Bury Me, My Love	2017	The Pixel Hunt	Arte France	
Bush Hockey League	2017	V7 Entertainment		
Capsized	2013	Alientrap		
Carrion	2020	Phobia Game Studio	Devolver Digital	
Celeste	2018	Maddy Thorson		
Chasm	2018	Bit Kid, Inc.		
Cobalt Core	2023	Rocket Rat Games	Brace Yourself Games	
Desktop Survivors 98	2025	Brandon Hesslau		
DLC Quest	2013	Going Loud Studios		
Duck Game	2014	Landon Podbielski	Adult Swim Games	
Dungeonmans	2014	Dungeonmans Games		
Dust: An Elysian Tail	2014	Humble Hearts		Originally created in XNA and later ported to MonoGame
Escape Goat	2011	MagicalTimeBean		
Fez	2013	Polytron Corporation	Trapdoor; Microsoft Studios	
Flinthook	2017	Tribute Games		
Infinite Flight	2011	Flying Development Studio		Built with MonoGame and Xamarin
Jets'n'Guns 2	2020	Rake in Grass		
Jump King	2019	Nexile	Nexile; Ukiyo Publishing	
Kynseed	2022	PixelCount Studios		
Let's Build a Zoo	2021	Springloaded	No More Robots	
Mercenary Kings	2013	Tribute Games		Among the first MonoGame titles released on PlayStation 4
NAIR	2021	Teridax		
OneShot: World Machine Edition	2022	Future Cat	Dangen Entertainment	
Owlboy	2016	D-Pad Studio		
Pyre	2017	Supergiant Games		
Quaver	2020	Swan		
Retro Bowl	2020	New Star Games		
Robot Legions Reborn	2016	Skyboy Games		
Salt and Sanctuary	2016	Ska Studios		PlayStation 4 version
Score Rush Extended	2016	Xona Games	Reverb Communications	
ScourgeBringer	2020	Flying Oak Games	Dear Villagers	
Skulls of the Shogun	2013	17-BIT	Microsoft Studios	
Solar 2	2011	Jay Watts	Murudai	
Stardew Valley	2016	ConcernedApe		
Stay Safe	2019	Lance		
Streets of Rage 4	2020	Dotemu, Lizardcube, Guard Crush Games	Dotemu	
Super Blood Hockey	2017	Loren Lemcke		
The Swapper	2013	Facepalm Games		
Tamashika	2026	Quicktequila	EDGLRD	
Teenage Mutant Ninja Turtles: Shredder's Revenge	2022	Tribute Games	Dotemu	
Terraria	2011	Re-Logic	505 Games	
Tiny Life	2023	Ellpeck Games	Top Hat Studios, Inc.	
Tooth and Tail	2017	Pocketwatch Games		
TowerFall	2013	Maddy Thorson		TowerFall Ascension was among the first MonoGame titles released on PlayStation 4
Transistor	2014	Supergiant Games		Uses Supergiant's fork of MonoGame; among the first MonoGame titles released on PlayStation 4
Ty the Tasmanian Tiger 4	2015	Krome Studios		
Unrailed!	2020	Indoor Astronaut	Daedalic Entertainment	
Vestaria Saga II: The Sacred Sword of Silvanister	2022	Vestaria Saga Project		
Wizorb	2011	Tribute Games		
Woon	TBA	Tour De Pizza	Tour De Pizza	
Yuppie Psycho	2019	Baroque Decay	Neon Doctrine	

=== Education and other uses ===
Because MonoGame provides low-level building blocks rather than a visual editor or built-in scripting language, it has also been adopted in academic and hobbyist settings to teach fundamental game-programming concepts such as the game loop, sprite batching, and content pipelines. Instructional books such as Game Development with MonoGame (Apress, 2022) and long-running tutorial series from independent game-development sites have used the framework to teach 2D and 3D game programming in C#. The Foundation also publishes starter kits, including a 2D platformer, a 3D platformer and a 3D city builder.

== Documentation and support ==
The Foundation publishes documentation, an API reference and tutorials on its documentation site, and directs support requests to its community forum and the project's issue tracker on GitHub. The project's README also lists GitHub Discussions and a Discord server as places to ask questions.

== Legal aspects ==
MonoGame is an independent reimplementation of Microsoft's XNA 4 API rather than a fork of Microsoft's own source code, having grown out of the community projects Mono.XNA and SilverSprite. Because MonoGame could not initially reuse Microsoft's copyrighted XNA reference documentation, contributors had to write original documentation from scratch; in 2022, Microsoft authorized the MonoGame project to reuse the former official XNA documentation, provided a copyright notice crediting Microsoft is included. MonoGame's willingness to extend and reinterpret the XNA API, rather than reproduce it with strict fidelity, later led developer Ethan Lee to fork the project around 2013 into a separate, accuracy-focused reimplementation named FNA.

== See also ==
- .NET Framework
- Mono (software)
- List of game engines
- Video game development
