= ScourgeBringer =

2020 roguelite platform video game

- Developers: Flying Oak Games; E-Studio
- Publisher: Dear Villagers
- Designer: Thomas Altenburger
- Artist: Florian Hurtaut
- Writer: Pia Jacqmart
- Composer: Joonas Turner
- Engine: MonoGame
- Platforms: Windows; macOS; Linux; Xbox One; Nintendo Switch; PlayStation 4; PlayStation Vita; PlayStation 5; iOS; Android
- Release: Windows, macOS, Linux, Xbox One, Switch; 21 October 2020; PlayStation 4, PlayStation Vita; 22 April 2021; PlayStation 5; 19 April 2022; iOS, Android; 13 September 2022
- Genres: Roguelite, platform
- Mode: Single-player

ScourgeBringer is a 2020 roguelite platform game developed by French studios Flying Oak Games and E-Studio and published by Dear Villagers. It entered early access for Windows, macOS and Linux in February 2020 before its full release for those platforms, Xbox One and Nintendo Switch on 21 October 2020. Versions for PlayStation consoles and mobile devices were released later.

Set in a post-apocalyptic world, the game follows Kyhra, a warrior who enters a mysterious monolithic structure responsible for devastating humanity. Gameplay combines procedurally arranged rooms with fast-paced combat designed around remaining airborne, using sword attacks, firearms, dashes and wall movement. Death returns Kyhra to a central hub, where resources earned by defeating bosses can be spent on permanent upgrades.

ScourgeBringer received generally favorable reviews. Critics particularly praised the responsiveness of its controls, aerial movement and combat, while several considered its permanent and temporary upgrade systems less varied than those of other roguelites. It was nominated for Best Game Design at the 2021 Pégase Awards.

== Gameplay ==
ScourgeBringer is a side-view action roguelite in which the player controls Kyhra, a warrior whose people have been devastated by the arrival of a mysterious structure known as the ScourgeBringer. Previous warriors who entered the structure have failed to return, leaving Kyhra to explore it in search of the origin of the catastrophe and a means of saving humanity.

Each area consists of interconnected rooms whose arrangement changes between runs. Combat rooms must generally be cleared before the player can continue, while other rooms contain merchants, challenges and temporary upgrades. Each major area includes a Guardian miniboss and culminates in a boss known as a Judge. A map records explored rooms and allows the player to choose routes through each procedurally arranged area.

Combat emphasizes continuous movement and attacking rather than defensive positioning. Kyhra can double-jump, climb or cling to walls and chain dashes together, allowing much of a fight to take place without touching the ground. Her principal weapon is a sword, supplemented by a heavier attack that can stun enemies. Successful melee attacks recharge ammunition for a firearm, which can later be replaced by weapons including grenade launchers, lasers and other ranged weapons. Permanent upgrades can add abilities such as reflecting enemy projectiles, stronger combinations of sword attacks and additional special moves.

Defeating Judges awards a resource called Judge Blood. Unlike most objects obtained during a run, Judge Blood persists after death and can be spent at the starting hub on a skill tree that improves Kyhra or unlocks new abilities. Other upgrades last only for the current run. Altars offer Blood Favors that modify properties such as health, projectile speed or damage, while weapons and passive bonuses can also be found or purchased while exploring. On death, Kyhra returns to the hub and begins another attempt with her permanent upgrades retained.

The game was designed to be highly challenging but includes optional accessibility settings. Players can reduce the speed of the game or enemy projectiles and alter health recovery, including an invulnerability option.

== Development and release ==
ScourgeBringer was principally created by Flying Oak Games founders Thomas Altenburger and Florian Hurtaut, who had previously developed the roguelite twin-stick shooter NeuroVoider. Altenburger handled programming and game design, while Hurtaut was responsible for the art direction and animation. Sound designer Joonas Turner of E-Studio composed the music and produced the sound design.

According to Hurtaut, the developers had initially intended to avoid making a platform game after finishing NeuroVoider, and experimented with numerous prototypes before settling on the design that became ScourgeBringer. Altenburger said the team subsequently spent more than a year refining the game's movement and overall "feel". Their aim was to create a state of continuous concentration or "flow", with rooms that could be understood quickly and cleared while the player remained in motion. The developers also treated the project as a reaction to aspects of NeuroVoider with which they had been dissatisfied. Whereas that game's bosses had been procedurally assembled and consequently tended to behave similarly, Flying Oak designed the bosses of ScourgeBringer individually. Altenburger later said that the team had initially underestimated the design work required for a roguelike when making NeuroVoider. For ScourgeBringer, they instead began with its core action mechanics and constructed its roguelite systems around them.

Although reviewers and promotional material frequently compared the game with Dead Cells and Celeste, Altenburger said that combination had not been the team's original design brief. He instead identified rapid platforming, responsive controls and uninterrupted movement as the central elements of the game. The developers also sought to connect the roguelite structure more closely with the narrative than they had in NeuroVoider. Narrative designer Pia Jacqmart was brought onto the project after Flying Oak established the broad story. Altenburger said the team wanted gameplay concepts—including the use of blood as currency and the repeated cycle of death and return—to exist within the fiction rather than operate solely as menu systems.

Turner, whose earlier game soundtracks included Nuclear Throne, Downwell and Broforce, was given broad creative freedom over the music. The soundtrack was constructed around the changing intensity of combat; reviewers noted that its mixture of electronic and heavy guitar music responds to encounters and drops away as combat ends.

An early version of ScourgeBringer was released through Steam Early Access on 6 February 2020 for Windows, macOS and Linux. The completed version was released on 21 October 2020 for those platforms, Xbox One and Nintendo Switch, and was made available through Xbox Game Pass. Version 1.0 added an additional realm, bosses and enemies to the early-access content.

PlayStation 4 and PlayStation Vita versions followed on 22 April 2021. The Vita release was notable for arriving after production of the handheld console itself had ended. A PlayStation 5 version was released on 19 April 2022. Versions for iOS and Android were released on 13 September 2022, with touchscreen controls and additional difficulty options adapted for mobile play.

== Reception ==
Reception

Aggregate scores
Aggregator	Score
Metacritic	76/100 (PC); 75/100 (XONE); 80/100 (NS); 78/100 (PS4)
OpenCritic	83%

Review scores
Publication	Score
Gamekult	7/10
Nintendo Life	9/10
Jeuxvideo.com	13/20

According to review aggregator Metacritic, ScourgeBringer received "generally favorable" reviews. OpenCritic reported an average score of 81 out of 100, with 83% of critics recommending the game.

Christian Donlan of Eurogamer praised the game's movement and combat, focusing on the physical sensation of attacking enemies and moving through them. He compared ScourgeBringer with action roguelites such as Hades and Dead Cells, but found that its movement gave it a distinct feel. Brendan Caldwell of Rock Paper Shotgun considered comparisons with Dead Cells less useful, describing ScourgeBringer instead as a more arcade-oriented, room-clearing action game. He praised its dashing, wall-running and aerial attacks, while noting that it offered fewer rewards and progression systems than many other roguelites.

Gautoz of Gamekult regarded the combat as one of the strongest 2D action systems he had played that year. He praised the precision of Kyhra's movement, the animation, boss encounters and sound design, as well as the ability to chain attacks while remaining airborne. His assessment of the roguelite systems was less favourable. Most permanent abilities, he wrote, could be unlocked relatively quickly, while Blood Favors and other modifiers repeated too often and upgrades offered few interactions or synergies between runs. He therefore considered ScourgeBringer more successful as an arcade action game built around combos and player skill than as a deep roguelite. Charlanmhg praised the difficulty, rapid succession of attempts and later areas, but found that weapons and temporary bonuses rarely changed the player's basic approach. In his view, success depended more on mastering the game's mechanics than on randomized builds, making it closer in practice to a demanding trial-and-error action game than to a roguelite built around substantially different runs. He also criticized the sparse presentation of the story and the limited amount of post-game variety.

PJ O'Reilly of Nintendo Life rated the Switch version very highly, praising the responsiveness of the movement, the enemy and boss encounters, the audiovisual presentation and the game's performance in both handheld and docked modes. He also regarded the accessibility options as useful for players learning the later encounters. O'Reilly's main criticism was that, despite the quality of its execution, ScourgeBringer did not substantially depart from the established roguelite formula.

Thomas Pillon of Gameblog wrote that the combat gave players a reason to persist through the game's increasing difficulty and repetition, comparing successful runs to a fast aerial "ballet". He criticized Turner's soundtrack as repetitive and found that the rising difficulty could make failed attempts late in a run particularly frustrating.

=== Accolades ===
At the 2021 Pégase Awards, ScourgeBringer was nominated for Best Game Design alongside Paper Beast and There Is No Game: Wrong Dimension. The award was won by There Is No Game.
