= Hitz =

- Genre: Sitcom
- Created by: Mark Cullen
- Developed by: Richard Vaczy; Tracy Gamble
- Written by: Jamie Wooten; Mark Cullen
- Directed by: Gary Brown
- Starring: Andrew Dice Clay; Rick Gomez; Claude Brooks; Rosa Blasi; Kristin Dattilo; Spencer Garrett
- Composer: Christopher Neal Nelson
- Country of origin: United States
- Original language: English
- No. of seasons: 1
- No. of episodes: 17 (7 unaired)

Production
- Executive producers: Tracy Gamble; Richard Vaczy
- Producer: Claude Brooks
- Running time: 30 minutes
- Production companies: Vaczy-Gamble Productions; MTV Productions; Paramount Network Television

Original release
- Network: UPN
- Release: August 26 – November 11, 1997

Hitz is an American sitcom that aired on UPN from August 26 until November 11, 1997. The series follows two record industry executives (Rick Gomez and Claude Brooks) and their boss (Andrew Dice Clay) at Hitower Records in Los Angeles.

== Cast ==
- Andrew Dice Clay as Jimmy Esposito
- Rick Gomez as Robert Moore
- Claude Brooks as Busby Evans
- Rosa Blasi as April Beane
- Kristin Dattilo as Angela
- Spencer Garrett as Tommy Stans

== Episodes ==
No.	Title	Directed by	Written by	Original release date
1	"Pilot"	Rob Schiller	Story by : Mark Cullen; Teleplay by : Mark Cullen & Richard Vaczy & Tracy Gamble	August 26, 1997
2	"It Ain't Over Till..."	Rob Schiller	Tracy Gamble & Richard Vaczy	September 2, 1997
3	"The Godfather: Not the Movie"	Brian K. Roberts	Bill Boulware	September 9, 1997
4	"My Favorite Geer"	Brian K. Roberts	Vance DeGeneres	September 16, 1997
5	"I Can't Get No Satisfaction"	Terri McCoy	Jamie Wooten	September 23, 1997
6	"Comedy Jam"	Unknown	David Flebotte	September 30, 1997
7	"Guys and Dolls"	Terri McCoy	Marc Abrams & Michael Benson	October 14, 1997
8	"Jive Talkin"	Unknown	Unknown	October 28, 1997
9	"You Probably Think This Song Is About You"	Ted Wass	Bob Daily	November 4, 1997
10	"Give the Drummer Some"	Paul Miller	Bill Boulware	November 11, 1997
11	"Cat's Cradle"	N/A	N/A	Unaired
12	"Radio Daze"	N/A	N/A	Unaired
13	"You Can Almost Go Home Again"	N/A	N/A	Unaired
14	"Sleeping with the Enemy"	N/A	N/A	Unaired
15	"Riffapalooza"	N/A	N/A	Unaired
16	"Yo' Mama"	N/A	N/A	Unaired
17	"What's Your Name, Who's Your Daddy?"	N/A	N/A	Unaired

== Production ==
Although UPN had initially ordered 13 episodes, by October the network had ordered nine more episodes for a total of 22. However, by December the series was canceled before production on the last six episodes was complete.

== Reception ==
Caryn James of The New York Times called the series "relentlessly unfunny." Ken Tucker of Entertainment Weekly rated the series as one of the worst of the year. Howard Rosenberg of the Los Angeles Times wrote that Hitz is "prime time at its flat-out dumbest and unfunniest."

== Hitz retooling ==
Variety stated in July 1997 that UPN's CEO Lucie Salhany said the network was retooling Hitz in an attempt to tone down the down the series after complaints that the program was misogynistic.

The Hitz producers told an audience at a meeting of the TV Critics Association in Southern California that they will introduce a strong female character that will stand up to Andrew Dice Clay's boss character, Jimmy. The character of Jimmy, executives also said, was modeled after Sony music chief Tommy Mottola.
