= Mark and Robb Cullen =

American screenwriters

- Born: Philadelphia, Pennsylvania, U.S.
- Occupations: Screenwriters; film producers; directors

Mark Cullen and Robb Cullen are brothers and American film and television writers and producers, who usually work together.

The brothers have created multiple primetime TV series – Hitz for UPN, Lucky for FX, Gary The Rat for SpikeTV, and Heist for NBC. The Cullen brothers co-created and executive produced Back in the Game on ABC, as well as Mr. Robinson for NBC. They have also written and produced multiple pilots for Fox, NBC, ABC, CBS, UPN, The WB, Comedy Central, MTV, TBS, TV Land, SpikeTV, FX, Syfy, HBO and Showtime.

The Cullen brothers wrote the screenplay for the 2010 Kevin Smith film Cop Out starring Bruce Willis, Tracy Morgan, Seann William Scott, Adam Brody and Kevin Pollak. In 2010, it was reported that the Cullen brothers had written a screenplay for the remake of the movie Uptown Saturday Night for Will Smith and his Overbrook Entertainment.

They were nominated for a Primetime Emmy in 2003 in the category of "Outstanding Writing for a Comedy Series" for the pilot episode of Lucky.

== Filmography ==
- Cop Out (2010, writer)
- Once Upon a Time in Venice (2017, director, producer, writer)
