= Adrian Martinez (actor) =

American actor (born 1972)

- Martinez in 2026
- Born: January 20, 1972 (age 54); New York City, US
- Occupation: Actor
- Years active: 1993–present

Adrian Martinez (born January 20, 1972) is a Latino-American actor, known for The Secret Life of Walter Mitty and Focus.

== Career ==
Martinez started his acting career with the series America's Most Wanted in 1993. He has worked in the theater, and is a member of LAByrinth Theater Company.

In 2009, Martinez appeared in the video game Grand Theft Auto IV: The Lost and Damned as Brian Jeremy, the secondary antagonist.

In 2010, he appeared in the action comedy Cop Out as Tino, released on February 26, 2010, by Warner Bros. Pictures. He portrayed Ginger Goon in the superhero comedy film Kick-Ass, directed by Matthew Vaughn and released on April 16, 2010.

In 2012, Martinez appeared in Spanish-language comedy and Will Ferrell vehicle Casa de Mi Padre as Manuel. The film was directed by Matt Piedmont and was released on March 16, 2012.

In 2013, Martinez appeared in the comedy film The Secret Life of Walter Mitty as Hernando, Mitty's understudy. Later he took a role in American Hustle as Julius. In 2014, Martinez appeared in the superhero film The Amazing Spider-Man 2 as 'Bodega Cashier'.

In 2015, Martinez took on the prominent role of Farhad in the heist comedy Focus. The film was released on February 27, 2015, by Warner Bros. Focus was his first main role in the career of 20 years, which Martinez likened to "running in a marathon for 20 years and somebody from the side just reached out and handed [him] a cup of Champagne."

In 2015, Martinez acted in the comedy film Sisters, released on December 18, 2015, and the action comedy Once Upon a Time in Venice (also known as LA Vengeance in the UK) starring Bruce Willis. The film was delayed and eventually released via video-on-demand to poor reviews in 2017.

He joined the main cast of the ABC TV series Stumptown in 2019 as "Tookie", a food truck owner who serves as an informant for the main character, played by Cobie Smulders.

Martinez also stars in the American espionage thriller The Amateur, which was released in 2025.

In 2025, it was announced that Martinez would be joining Jamie Foxx and Andrés Baiz in the Netflix feature film Fight for '84.

In 2026, Martinez made his Broadway debut in Downstate.

== Filmography ==
=== Film ===
Year	Title	Role	Notes
1994	Murder Magic	Court Clerk	
1998	A Perfect Murder	Young Tough	
1999	Some Fish Can Fly	Humping Man	
2002	In America	Shopkeeper	
2003	Pieces of April	Man in Mohair Sweater	
2003	It Runs in the Family	Mitchell's Doorman	
2003	Undefeated	Chewey	TV film
2004	Bad Apple	Ferry Captain	TV film
2004	Strip Search	Maintenance man	TV film
2004	Men Without Jobs	Wolfy	
2004	Mail Order Wife	Adrian	
2004	Taxi	Brazilian Man	
2004	Corn	Postal Delivery Man	
2004	Downtown: A Street Tale	Frankie	
2005	The Interpreter	Roland	
2006	Just Like the Son	Glen	
2006	Bristol Boys	Wancho	
2006	Three Strikes	'Gorgeous' Chris Borges	TV film
2007	Stanley Cuba	Duarte	
2007	American Loser	Harris	
2007	Before the Devil Knows You're Dead	Security Guard	
2008	Manny	Manny	short
2008	The Promotion	Octavio	
2008	Mona	Bob	
2008	Corporate Affairs	Gregg Martinez	
2008	The Understudy	Guard	
2008	The Tree	Beer Drinking Guy	short
2008	Righteous Kill	Glenn	
2009	Don't Let Me Drown	Little Joe	
2009	Made for Each Other	Harry	
2009	The Good Guy	Larry	
2009	Veronika Decides to Die	Male Nurse #1	
2009	The Taking of Pelham 123	Cabbie	
2009	Little New York	Officer Rodriguez	
2009	The Ministers	Mike	
2010	Cop Out	Tino	
2010	Kick-Ass	Ginger Goon	
2010	It's Kind of a Funny Story	Johnny	
2010	Morning Glory	IBS Lobby Guard	
2010	Wired Doll	Victor	short
2010	Trouble Child	John	short
2010	The Martyr	Ruben	short
2010	Superego	Eduardo	TV film
2011	Choose	Actor	
2011	Flypaper	Mr. Clean	
2011	Extremely Loud and Incredibly Close	Hector Black	
2012	Casa de Mi Padre	Manuel	
2012	Piranha 3DD	Big Dave	
2012	Putzel	Hector	
2013	Newlyweeds	Hernan	
2013	Helena's Flushing	Gomer	short
2013	Bert and Arnie's Guide to Friendship	Ernesto	
2013	Chinese Puzzle	Le patron coursier	
2013	The Secret Life of Walter Mitty	Hernando	
2013	Home	Hector	
2013	The Miracle of Spanish Harlem	Ernesto Rodriguez de la Torre	
2013	American Hustle	Julius	
2013	Disconnected		short
2014	The Amazing Spider-Man 2	Bodega Cashier	
2015	Focus	Farhad	
2015	Chloe and Theo	Actor	
2015	Sisters	Officer Harris	
2016	White Girl	Lloyd	
2016	37	Gonzalez	
2016	Almost Paris	Ricky	
2016	Army of One	Mysterious Man #1	
2016	Office Christmas Party	Larry	
2016	Some Last Day	Edgar	short
2017	Once Upon a Time in Venice	Tino	
2018	I Feel Pretty	Mason	
2019	Lady and the Tramp	Elliot	
2020	The Stand In	Reporter Banjo	
2021	The Guilty	Manny	
2021	iGilbert	Gilbert Gonzalez	
2022	Measure of Revenge	Addison	
2023	Renfield	Chris Marcos	
2024	Unfrosted	Tom Carvel	
2025	The Amateur	Carlos	
2026	The Man with the Bag		Post-production
2026	A Statement	Ed	
TBA	Fight for '84		Post-production

=== Television ===
Year	Title	Role	Notes
1993	America's Most Wanted	Jimmy Ruiz	1 episode
1998	NYPD Blue	Marco	1 episode
2000	Third Watch	Sam Wolfe	1 episode
2000	The Sopranos	Ramone	1 episode
2001	The Job	Miguel Alvarez	1 episode
2001	Sex and the City	Delivery Boy	1 episode
2002	100 Centre Street	Cop #2	1 episode
2002	The Education of Max Bickford	Pete Boroni	1 episode
2002	Law & Order	Hector	1 episode
2002	Between the Lions	Patron	1 episode
2001–2002	Ed	Guy #1	2 episodes
2003	Queens Supreme	Manuel Morales	1 episode
2004	The Jury	Anthony Parenti	1 episode
2000–2007	Late Night with Conan O'Brien	Sidewalk Conan / Foreign Conan	Recurring role, 6 episodes
2001–2008	Law & Order: Criminal Intent	Amado / Kellogg / Airport Policeman	3 episodes
2009	Delocated	Jay	1 episode
2007–2009	Flight of the Conchords	Hotelier / A.J.	2 episodes
2009	Mercy	Hector	1 episode
2010	How to Make It in America	Actor	1 episode
2003–2010	Law & Order: Special Victims Unit	Stuart Linderby / Emilio Vasquez	2 episodes
2011	Onion News Network	Actor	1 episode
2011–2012	A Gifted Man	Hector	Recurring role, 6 episodes
2014	Deadbeat	Hector	2 episodes
2014	Louie	Hurricane Man	1 episode
2015	Gotham	Irwin	1 episode
2013–2015	Inside Amy Schumer	Delivery Guy / Juror #5 / Jim	3 episodes
2016	The Blacklist	Dumont	1 episode
2016	Falling Water	Marcos	1 episode
2017	The Blacklist: Redemption	Dumont	Main role, 8 episodes
2017	No Activity	Roberto	Main role, 7 episodes
2019–2020	Stumptown	Tookie	Main role, 18 episodes
2020	Curb Your Enthusiasm	Harold	1 episode
2023	Awkwafina Is Nora from Queens	Darryl	Episode: "Bad Grandma"
2023	Only Murders in the Building	Gregg	Episode: "The Beat Goes On"
2024	Ghosts	Mike	season 3 episode 9 "The Traveling Agent"
2024	Sugar	Glen	1 episode
2025	Severance	Mr. Saliba	Episode "Goodbye, Mrs. Selvig"

=== Video games ===
Year	Title	Role	Notes	Source
2009	Grand Theft Auto IV: The Lost and Damned	Brian Jeremy	voice and motion capture	

=== Theater ===
Year	Title	Role	Venue	Source
2026	Downstate	Felix	Broadway, Booth Theatre	
