= Mr. Robinson (TV series) =

2015 American sitcom

- Genre: Sitcom
- Created by: Owen Ellickson
- Developed by: Robb Cullen; Mark Cullen
- Starring: Craig Robinson; Ben Koldyke; Brandon T. Jackson; Spencer Grammer; Amandla Stenberg; Peri Gilpin
- Composer: Ryan Beveridge
- Country of origin: United States
- Original language: English
- No. of seasons: 1
- No. of episodes: 6

Production
- Executive producers: Robb Cullen; Mark Cullen; Howard Klein; Mark Schulman; Andy Ackerman
- Cinematography: Patti Lee
- Camera setup: Multi-camera
- Running time: 30 minutes
- Production companies: 3 Arts Entertainment; Cullen Bros. Television; Universal Television

Original release
- Network: NBC
- Release: August 5 – August 19, 2015

Mr. Robinson is an American television sitcom created by Owen Ellickson, and developed by Robb Cullen and Mark Cullen, which aired on NBC from August 5 to August 19, 2015.

== Premise ==
The series stars Craig Robinson as a high school music teacher and part-time musician.

== Cast and characters ==
=== Main ===
- Craig Robinson as Craig Robinson
- Ben Koldyke as Jimmy Hooper
- Brandon T. Jackson as Ben Robinson
- Spencer Grammer as Ashleigh Fellows
- Amandla Stenberg as Halle Foster
- Peri Gilpin as Principal Eileen Taylor

=== Recurring ===
- Meagan Good as Victoria Wavers
- Tim Bagley as Supervisor Dalton
- Asif Ali as Samir Panj
- Dante Brown as Deandre Hall
- Ethan Josh Lee as Quan Phook
- Franchesca Maia as Maria

== Production ==
=== Development ===
The original pilot was created by Owen Ellickson and was in development at NBC for the 2013–14 United States network television season. It also starred Robinson, and included a cast of Jean Smart, Larenz Tate, Amandla Stenberg and Amanda Lund. Greg Daniels served as executive producer.

NBC placed a six-episode order for the series on January 6, 2014, with Mark Cullen and Robb Cullen as showrunners, replacing Owen Ellickson, and several characters recast. The series debuted in August 2015.

=== Cancellation ===
On September 14, 2015, the series was cancelled after one season and six episodes.

== Episodes ==
No.	Title	Directed by	Written by	Original release date	U.S. viewers (millions)
1	"Pilot"	Andy Ackerman	Robb Cullen & Mark Cullen	August 5, 2015	4.60
Craig Robinson, a musician looking to earn some extra cash, takes a job as the new substitute music teacher in efforts of winning the affections of Victoria, a former high school girlfriend.
2	"Flesh for Fantasy"	Andy Ackerman	Susan Hurwitz Arneson	August 5, 2015	3.79
3	"Ain't Nothin' but a Hound Dog"	Michael Lembeck	Robb Cullen & Mark Cullen	August 12, 2015	4.39
4	"Love the One You're With"	Andy Ackerman	Warren Hutcherson	August 12, 2015	3.48
5	"Can't Buy Me Love"	Andy Ackerman	Peter Tibbals & Eric Goldberg	August 19, 2015	4.10
6	"School's Out for Summer"	Phill Lewis	Robb Cullen & Mark Cullen	August 19, 2015	3.31

== Reception ==
Mr. Robinson has received generally negative reviews from critics. On Rotten Tomatoes the series has a rating of 19%, based on 26 reviews, with an average rating of 3.2/10. The site's critical consensus reads, "Mr. Robinson is held back by too many sitcom tropes, bad plots, and stock characters, wasting its appealing star." On Metacritic, the series has a score of 41 out of 100, based on 20 critics, indicating "mixed or average reviews".

Dominic Patten of Deadline said that the show is not funny. Bruce R. Miller of the Sioux City Journal said, "Mr. Robinson just does not work". Jeff Jensen of Entertainment Weekly gave the show a grade of C−.
