= Lucky (American TV series) =

- John Corbett as Michael "Lucky" Linkletter
- Genre: Dark comedy
- Created by: Robb Cullen; Mark Cullen
- Starring: John Corbett
- Original language: English
- No. of seasons: 1
- No. of episodes: 13 (& unaired Pilot)

Production
- Running time: 21–28 minutes
- Production companies: Cullen Bros. Television; Castle Rock Entertainment; Trainwreck Productions

Original release
- Network: FX Network
- Release: April 8 – July 1, 2003

Lucky is an American dark comedy television series which ran for one season on FX in 2003. The show starred John Corbett as Michael "Lucky" Linkletter, a professional poker player and gambling addict. The series was created by Robb Cullen and Mark Cullen. It was nominated for the 2003 Primetime Emmy Award for Outstanding Writing in a Comedy Series.

== Cast ==
=== Main ===
- John Corbett as Michael "Lucky" Linkletter
- Craig Robinson as Buddy "Mutha" LeGendre
- Billy Gardell as Vincent "Vinny" Sticcarelli

=== Supporting ===
- Ever Carradine as Theresa "Terry" Phillips
- Andrea Roth as Amy
- Kevin Breznahan as Danny Martin
- Seymour Cassel as Victor "The Trake" Fleming
- Dan Hedaya as Joey Legs
- Steve Troisi as Benny The Bartender
- Robb Cullen as Stan McWatt
- Mitch Lord as Brother Love

== Episodes ==
No.	Title	Directed by	Written by	Original release date
1	"Pilot"	Anthony Russo & Joe Russo	Robb Cullen & Mark Cullen	April 8, 2003
2	"Calling Dr. Con"	Peter Lauer	Robb Cullen & Mark Cullen	April 15, 2003
3	"Up the Steaks"	Anthony & Joe Russo	Robb Cullen & Mark Cullen	April 22, 2003
4	"Come Lie with Me"	Stephen Gyllenhaal	Molly Newman	April 29, 2003
5	"The Tell"	Michael Lessac	Story by : Bruce Kirschbaum; Teleplay by : Bruce Kirschbaum & Matt Ward	May 6, 2003
6	"Something for Everyone"	Peter Lauer	Robb Cullen, Mark Cullen, and Jimmy Aleck	May 13, 2003
7	"Savant"	Michael Spiller	Robb Cullen & Mark Cullen	May 20, 2003
8	"The Method"	Charles Minsky	Robb Cullen & Mark Cullen	May 27, 2003
9	"Lie, Cheat & Deal"	Peter Lauer	Robb Cullen & Mark Cullen	June 3, 2003
10	"Leaving Las Vegas"	Stephen Gyllenhaal	Robb Cullen & Mark Cullen	June 10, 2003
11	"The Dating Game"	John Fortenberry	Robb Cullen & Mark Cullen	June 17, 2003
12	"Money on Your Back"	Stephen Gyllenhaal	Robb Cullen & Mark Cullen	June 24, 2003
13	"It's in the Stars"	Michael Spiller	Robb Cullen & Mark Cullen	July 1, 2003

== See also ==
- List of television shows set in Las Vegas
