= Desktop Survivors 98 =

2025 video game

- Developer: Brandon Hesslau
- Publisher: Brandon Hesslau
- Engine: Monogame
- Platforms: Windows, Steam Deck
- Release: May 20, 2025
- Genres: Action game, rogue-like, bullet hell
- Mode: Single-player

Desktop Survivors 98 is a 2025 2D action rogue-like video game developed and published by Brandon Hesslau set in the aesthetics of the late '90s Windows desktop. The game was published on May 20, 2025, as the first demo version was first available on December 14, 2024 and available on Windows and Steam Deck.

== Gameplay ==
The game has been mainly presented as rogue-like, dungeon crawler and Vampire Survivors-like. During the game, the player moves between different rooms to battle waves of increasing number of enemies, collecting various weapons, using the mouse cursor. The game runs in the player's desktop where the player can interact with their computer during the game process, instead of using a conventional window.

== Reception ==
The game was widely described as "nostalgic" and "old-school", as the game's UI uses old Visual Basic-style sliders and buttons. Many journalists compared the game to Vampire Survivors and Rusty's Retirement. Some reviewers also stated that the game "brings to life childhood fantasies of turning a computer desktop into a playground".
