= Craig Robinson (actor) =

American actor, comedian and musician (born 1971)

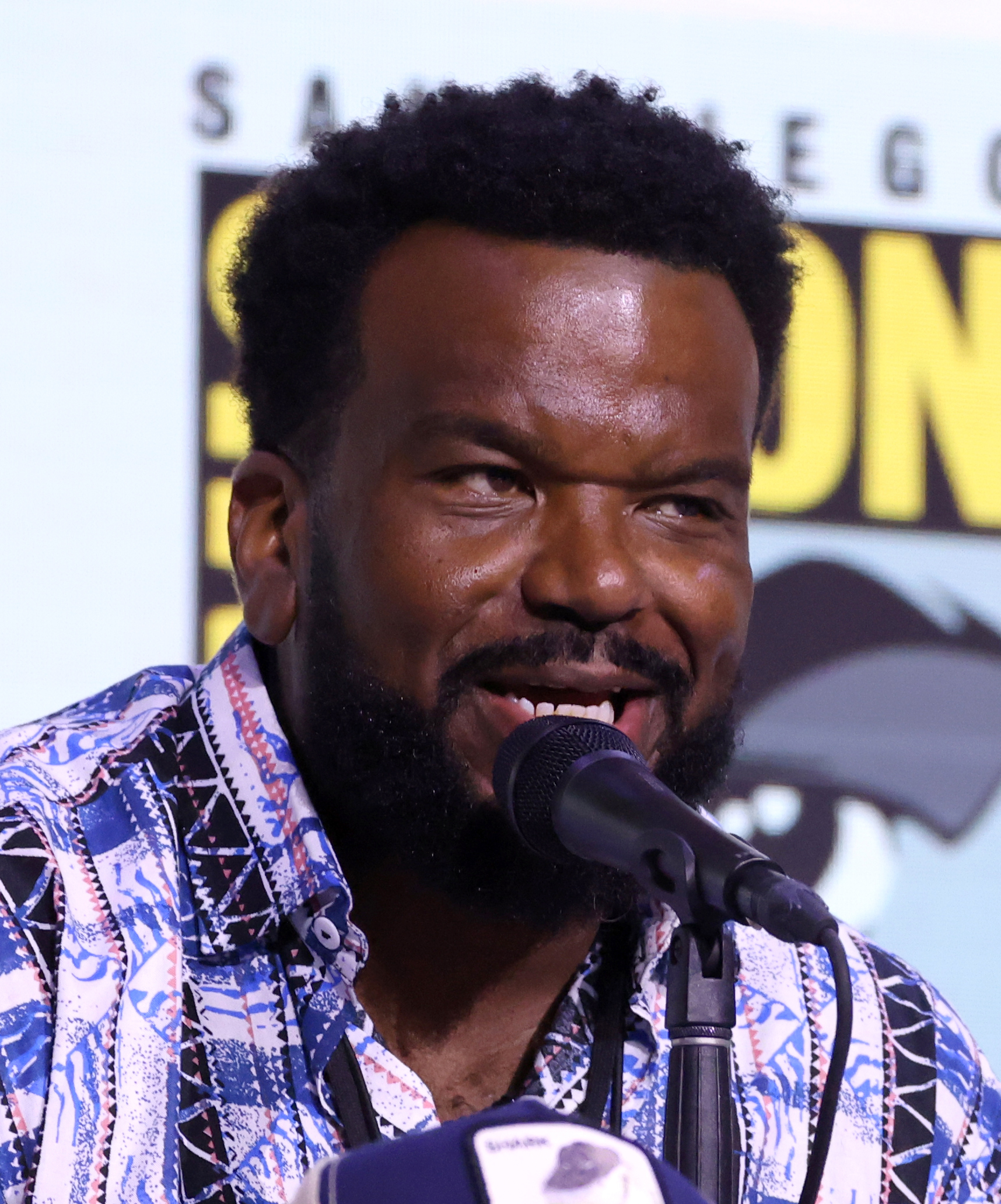
- Robinson at the 2025 San Diego Comic-Con
- Born: Craig Phillip Robinson; October 25, 1971 (age 55); Chicago, Illinois, U.S.
- Education: Illinois State University (BA) Saint Xavier University (MEd)
- Occupations: Actor; comedian; musician
- Years active: 2001–present

Craig Phillip Robinson (born October 25, 1971) is an American actor, comedian, and musician. The accolades he has received include nominations for five Screen Actors Guild Awards, an Independent Spirit Award, and a Daytime Emmy Award.

Robinson is best known for portraying Darryl Philbin on The Office (2005–2013). He also portrayed Ray Heyworth on Mr. Robot (2016), LeVar "Freight Train" Brown on The Cleveland Show (2009–2013), and Doug "the Pontiac Bandit" Judy on Brooklyn Nine-Nine (2013–2021). He also frequently collaborates with Seth Rogen, including the films Pineapple Express (2008), Zack and Miri Make a Porno (2008) and This Is the End (2013). Robinson has appeared in numerous other television shows and films, including Hot Tub Time Machine (2010), Get On Up (2014), An Evening with Beverly Luff Linn (2018), and Dolemite Is My Name (2019), as well as voicing characters in films such as Cookie in Shrek Forever After (2010), Mr. Grits in Sausage Party (2016), Mr. Shark in The Bad Guys film franchise (2022–present), Baloney Tony in In Your Dreams (2025), and Atlas in Toy Story 5 (2026). He was nominated for the Independent Spirit Award for Best Supporting Male for his performance in the film Morris from America.

From 2020 to 2021, Robinson hosted the reality dancing show The Masked Dancer. Robinson also starred in and executive produced the Peacock series Killing It (2022–2023), which had two seasons on the service.

== Early life ==
Robinson was born on October 25, 1971, in Chicago, Illinois, to a music teacher mother and an attorney father. He was raised on the South Side of Chicago, and was brought up Methodist. He attended Whitney M. Young Magnet High School. He received his Bachelor of Music degree from Illinois State University in 1994, and his Master of Education from Saint Xavier University. He was a music teacher at Horace Mann Elementary School in Chicago, and H. W. Eggers Middle School in Hammond, Indiana and East Chicago Central High School in East Chicago, Indiana.

== Career ==
=== Acting and comedy ===
Robinson began doing stand-up and taking classes in improv and acting at The Second City in Chicago while still in college. He was on Def Comedy Jam season 7, episode 2. After doing open-mic sessions in New York, Chicago, Los Angeles and elsewhere and winning regional comedy competitions, he began to get spots on late night TV shows like Jimmy Kimmel Live. 2004 saw him cast in bit parts, including episodes of Friends, The Bernie Mac Show, LAX and Arrested Development. Those led to small film roles in Knocked Up, Pineapple Express and Walk Hard: The Dewey Cox Story.

Beginning in 2005, he portrayed Darryl Philbin on the American version of The Office, appearing first in "The Alliance", the fourth episode of the first season. Robinson was promoted to a starring role in the fourth season and continued until the show ended in 2013.

In 2010, he hosted season seven of Last Comic Standing with judges Greg Giraldo, Natasha Leggero, and Andy Kindler.

He has appeared on other television shows, including Brooklyn Nine-Nine, Lucky, Halfway Home, and Reno 911!. He appeared in the music video for the Red Hot Chili Peppers song "Hump de Bump". He voiced Cookie in Shrek Forever After (2010) and played Reg Mackworthy on the HBO hit series Eastbound & Down (2009–2012).

Robinson is a frequent collaborator with Seth Rogen, starring alongside Rogen in the films Knocked Up (2007), Pineapple Express (2008), Zack and Miri Make a Porno (2008), This Is the End (2013), Sausage Party (2016), as well as the miniseries Santa Inc. (2021).

Robinson performed at the Just for Laughs Comedy Festival in 2008.

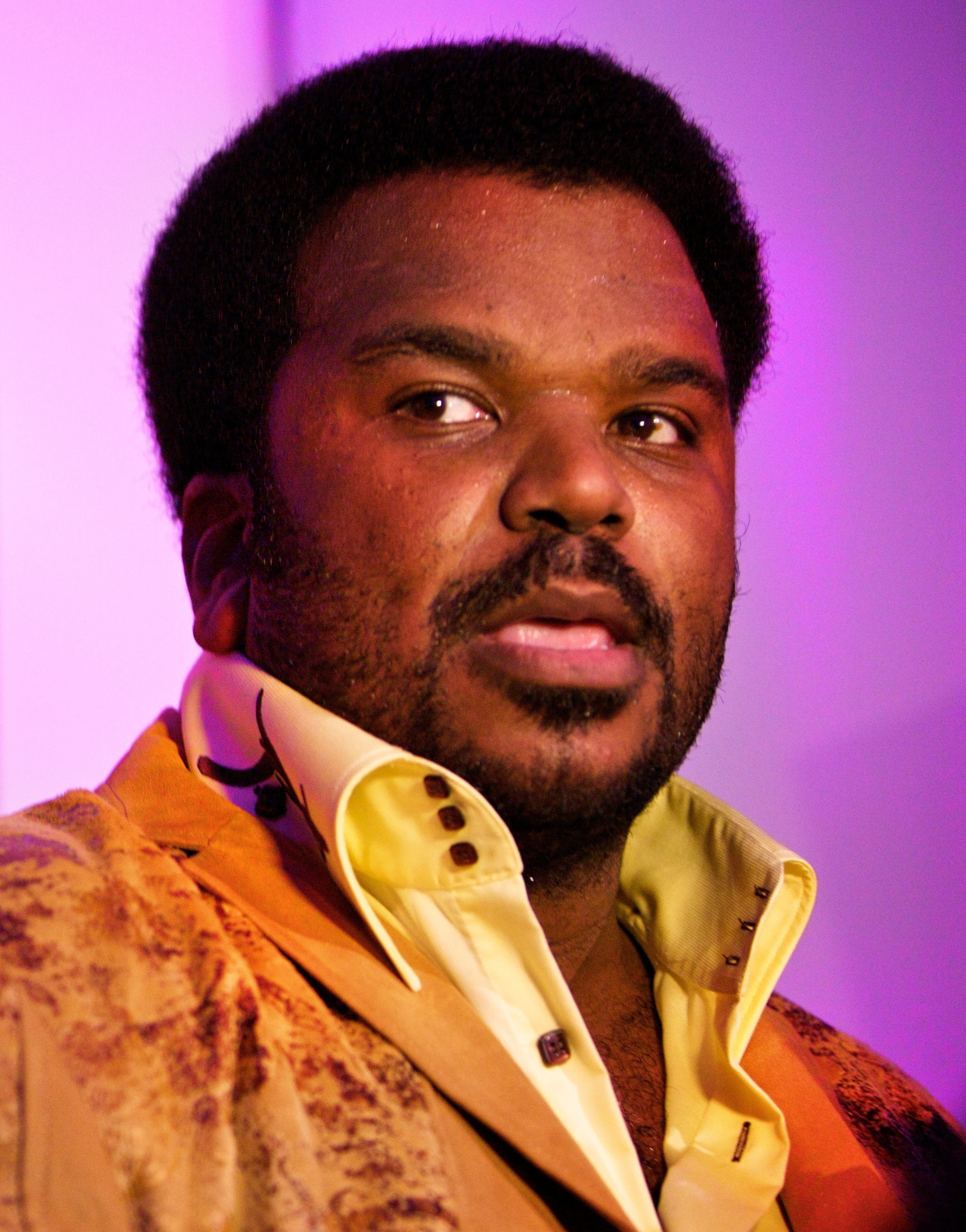
Robinson in 2009

In addition to Shrek Forever After and Sausage Party, Robinson has also provided his voice for the films Escape from Planet Earth (2013), Percy Jackson: Sea of Monsters (2013), Henchmen (2018), Dolittle (2020), and Toy Story 5 (2026).

He also appeared in the Korean film D-War (Korean: 디워), released in North America as Dragon Wars: D-War in 2007.

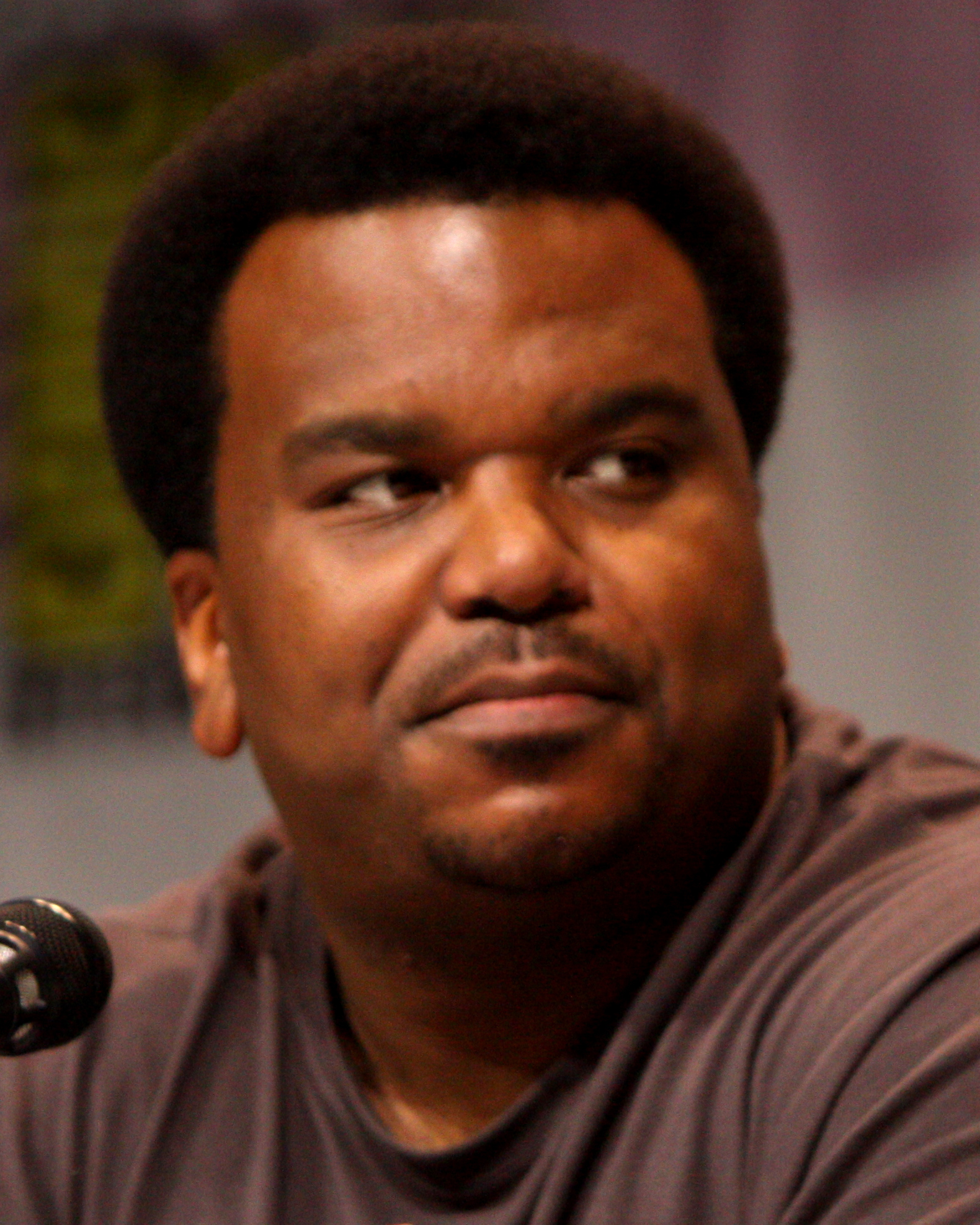
Robinson at WonderCon 2013

Around 2014, Robinson portrayed a farmer in commercials for the mobile game Hay Day.

Making a departure from his comedy background, Robinson portrayed saxophonist Maceo Parker in the James Brown biopic Get On Up (2014). In December 2015, he appeared in several Wal-Mart commercials promoting their credit card while singing and playing the piano at the store. He received rave reviews for the A24 drama Morris from America (2016), earning a nomination for the Independent Spirit Award for Best Supporting Male. He also played the role of Ray Hayworth in the second season of the drama series Mr. Robot. In 2018 he had a lead role playing the title character in the crime comedy film An Evening with Beverly Luff Linn.

In 2019 Robinson became the spokesman for the Philadelphia-area meat producer Dietz & Watson, appearing in several commercials for the company's line of deli meats. The first of these commercials aired in January 2019, featuring Robinson and his brother Chris promoting the snack Dietz Nuts with Robinson playing up the double entendre in the name of the product.

In June 2020, Robinson was reportedly confirmed to be starring in the COVID-19 pandemic-themed thriller Songbird produced by Michael Bay, alongside Demi Moore, Peter Stormare and Paul Walter Hauser.

Robinson was a guest judge in season four of The Masked Singer where he also performed Gloria Gaynor's "I Will Survive" as a "Mystery Piano Man" during his introduction.

Robinson later became the host of The Masked Dancer which has the same format as The Masked Singer. In 2021, Robinson was featured as a spokesperson for Pizza Hut advertising the return of their Detroit Styled Pizza and Original Stuffed Crust Pizza. Robinson also voiced a singing bust in Muppets Haunted Mansion.

In 2021, he started doing commercials for Gain detergent, singing a parody of "Maniac" by Michael Sembello.

His next series, Killing It, premiered on Peacock in April 2022 and he voiced Mr. Shark, in the 2022 DreamWorks Animation film The Bad Guys. That year, he also hosted the docuseries Harlem Globetrotters: Play It Forward on CNBC, which received an Emmy nomination.

On July 1, 2025, he announced he was "retiring" from comedy permanently to work on other projects. However, it was later revealed by Variety that the "announcement" was simply part of a new AT&T marketing campaign, and Robinson would indeed continue doing comedy.

=== Music ===
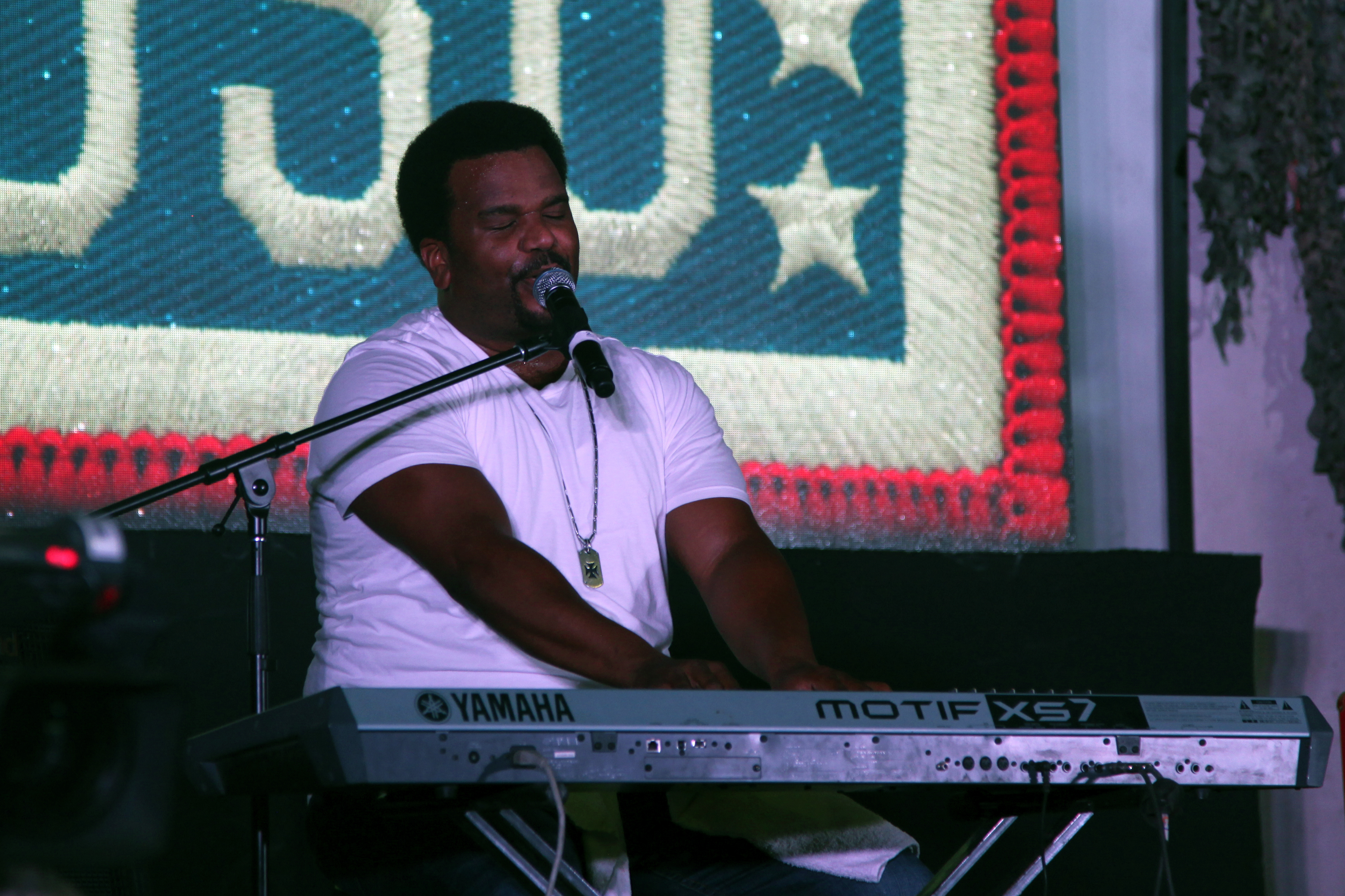
Robinson performing in 2014

For a number of years, Robinson and comedian Jerry Minor had a comedy act where they performed as musical duo L. Witherspoon & Chucky, with Minor as smooth singing L. Witherspoon and Robinson as Chucky, the keyboard player and back-up singer. They performed the act on HBO's Sketch Pad, several stand-up shows on Comedy Central, Real Time with Bill Maher, and Jimmy Kimmel Live!

He occasionally performs with his band, The Nasty Delicious, alongside his brother and musical director Chris Rob on keyboards, Ethan Farmer on bass, Asa Watkins on drums, David Sampson on guitar, Lakecia Benjamin and Reggie Hines on saxophones, Winston Byrd on trumpet, and Bendji Allonce on percussion. They were featured as his band in an episode of The Office, and on the season finale of the seventh season of Last Comic Standing. He has also performed in character in multiple episodes of The Office, and was featured on the Hot Tub Time Machine soundtrack, singing "Jessie's Girl" and "Let's Get It Started". He was in the film Miss March, playing the role of the hit rapper Phil, also known as Horsedick.MPEG. Robinson produced two songs from that same film. In the film Dolemite Is My Name, playing the role of musician Ben Taylor, he performed the title theme of the Rudy Ray Moore blaxploitation film Dolemite.

He has performed with his band in the 2018 stand-up comedy special Seth Rogen's Hilarity for Charity.

== Filmography ==
=== Film ===
Key
†	Denotes works that have not yet been released

Year	Title	Role	Notes
2005	Year of the Scapegoat	Pappy Labourgeneaux	Short film
2007	D-War	Bruce	
2007	Daddy's Little Girls	Byron	
2007	Knocked Up	Club Doorman	
2007	Walk Hard: The Dewey Cox Story	Bobby Shad	
2008	Pineapple Express	Matheson	
2008	Zack and Miri Make a Porno	Delaney	
2008	Prop 8: The Musical	Preacher	Short film
2008	The Frequency of Claire	Q-pid	
2009	Fanboys	Skywalker Ranch guard	
2009	Miss March	Horsedick.MPEG	
2009	Memphis Calling	Memphis	Short film
2009	Night at the Museum: Battle of the Smithsonian	Tuskegee Airman	Cameo
2009	The Goods: Live Hard, Sell Hard	DJ Request	
2009	Post Grad	Funeral Director	
2010	Father of Invention	Jerry	
2010	Shrek Forever After	Cookie the Ogre	Voice
2010	Hot Tub Time Machine	Nick Webber-Agnew	
2013	Escape from Planet Earth	Doc	Voice
2013	Peeples	Wade Walker	Nominated—Teen Choice Award for Choice Movie Actor – Comedy
2013	This Is the End	Himself	MTV Movie Award for Best Musical Moment (shared with Jay Baruchel, Seth Rogen and The Backstreet Boys)
2013	Percy Jackson: Sea of Monsters	George	Voice
2013	Rapture-Palooza	Earl Gundy / Anti-Christ	Also executive producer
2014	Get On Up	Maceo Parker	
2015	Hot Tub Time Machine 2	Nick Webber	
2016	Morris from America	Curtis Gentry	Sundance Film Festival Dramatic Special Jury Award for Individual Performance; Nominated — Gotham Award for Best Actor; Nominated — Independent Spirit Award for Best Supporting Male
2016	Sausage Party	Mr. Grits	Voice
2017	Table 19	Jerry Kepp	
2017	Tragedy Girls	Albert "Big Al" Hill	Also producer
2017	Austin Found	Jebidiah	
2018	An Evening with Beverly Luff Linn	Beverly Luff Linn	
2018	Henchmen	Stew	Voice
2019	Dolemite Is My Name	Ben Taylor	
2019	Zeroville	Burglar	
2019	Jay and Silent Bob Reboot	Judge Jerry N. Executioner	
2020	Dolittle	Kevin	Voice
2020	Timmy Failure: Mistakes Were Made	Mr. Jenkins	
2020	Songbird	Lester	
2021	Mona Lisa and the Blood Moon	Officer Harold	
2022	The Bad Guys	Mr. Shark	Voice
2024	My Spy: The Eternal City	Connelly	
2024	Saving Bikini Bottom: The Sandy Cheeks Movie	Pa Cheeks	Voice
2024	Hot Frosty	Sheriff Nathaniel Hunter	
2025	The Bad Guys 2	Mr. Shark	Voice; Nominated — NAACP Image Award for Outstanding Character Voice Performance in a Motion Picture
2025	In Your Dreams	Baloney Tony	Voice; Nominated — Annie Award for Outstanding Achievement for Voice Acting in a Feature Production
2026	Toy Story 5	Atlas	Voice
TBA	The Ark and the Aardvark †	Clyde	Voice; Post-production

=== Television ===
Year	Title	Role	Notes
2002	Play'd: A Hip Hop Story	Cole	Television film
2003	Lucky	Mutha Rhodes	13 episodes
2004	The Bernie Mac Show	Wayne	Episode "Hair Jordan"
2004	LAX	Wayne	Episode: "Abduction"
2004	Friends	Clerk	Episode: "The One with Princess Consuela"
2005	Arrested Development	Studio Guard #1	Episode: "Switch Hitter"
2005	Curb Your Enthusiasm	Attendant #1	Episode: "The End"
2005–2013	The Office	Darryl Philbin	Nominated—NAACP Image Award for Outstanding Supporting Actor in a Comedy Series (2011–2013); Nominated—Screen Actors Guild Award for Outstanding Performance by an Ensemble in a Comedy Series (2009–2013)
2007	Halfway Home	Mr. Brown	Episode: "Halfway Working"
2009	James Gunn's PG Porn	Havana Bob	Episode: "Helpful Bus"
2009	Reno 911!	Levon French	Episode: "Deputy Dance"
2009, 2012	Eastbound & Down	Reggie Mackworthy	4 episodes
2009–2013	The Cleveland Show	LeVar "Freight Train" Brown	Voice
2011	Love Bites	Bowman	2 episodes
2013	Kroll Show	Various Characters	Episode: "The Greatest Hits of It"
2014	Comedy Bang! Bang!	Himself	Episode: "Craig Robinson Wears a Bordeaux Button Down & Dark Jeans"
2014–2021	Brooklyn Nine-Nine	Doug Judy (The Pontiac Bandit)	9 episodes
2015	Key & Peele	Wisdom Caldwell / Himself	Episode: "Super Bowl Special"
2015	Mr. Robinson	Craig Robinson	6 episodes; also producer
2016	Mr. Robot	Ray Heyworth	7 episodes
2016–2019	American Dad!	Security Officer / Dirk Turlington / DJ Avalanche / Himself	Voice; 6 episodes
2017	Caraoke Showdown	Himself (host)	10 episodes
2017–2018	Ghosted	Leroy Wright	16 episodes; also executive producer
2017–2018	Big Mouth	Various	Voice; 4 episodes
2018	Dream Corp, LLC	Mr. Metzler	Episode: "Guys and Dads"
2020	Medical Police	Edgar Tooby	Episode: "The Lasagna as a Whole"
2020	What We Do in the Shadows	Claude	2 episodes
2020	Home Movie: The Princess Bride	Fezzik	Episode: "Chapter Eight: Ultimate Suffering"
2020	Ryan's Mystery Playdate	Himself	Episode: "Ryan's Jurassic Playdate"
2020	The Masked Singer	Guest panelist	Episode: "The Semi Finals – The Super Six"
2020–2021	The Masked Dancer	Himself	Host
2020–present	Your Attention Please	Himself	Host
2021	Nickelodeon's Unfiltered	Himself	Episode: "This DJ is Bananas!"
2021	Last Week Tonight with John Oliver	Himself	Episode: "Hair"
2021	Muppets Haunted Mansion	Singing Bust	TV special
2021	Santa Inc.	Junior	Voice; 8 episodes
2022	The Wonderful World of Mickey Mouse	Snowflake Boss	Voice; Episode: "The Wonderful Winter of Mickey Mouse"
2022	Storybots: Answer Time	Lost Tourist	Episode: "GPS"
2022	Oni: Thunder God's Tale	Naridon	Voice, main role
2022–2023	Killing It	Craig Foster	Main role; also executive producer
2022–present	Harlem Globetrotters: Play It Forward	Himself	Host; also executive producer Nominated—Daytime Emmy Award for Outstanding Educational or Informational Program
2023–2024	Moon Girl and Devil Dinosaur	Principal Nelson	Voice, 3 episodes
2024	SpongeBob SquarePants	Pa Cheeks	Voice; Episode: "Sandy's Country Christmas"
2025	Krapopolis	Stavros	Voice; Episode: "Stavros Live and in Concert"
2025	Super Duper Bunny League	Rubber Dougie	Voice, Episode: "Bath Time for Bunnies"
2025	Tales of the Teenage Mutant Ninja Turtles	Spuds	Voice, 3 episodes
2026	The Fall and Rise of Reggie Dinkins	Jerry Basmati	3 episodes
2026	The Boys	Himself	Episode: "One-Shots", uncredited

=== Video games ===
Year	Title	Role	Notes
2010	Shrek Forever After	Cookie	
2026	Grand Theft Auto VI	Liquid Wilson	
