= Unrailed! =

2020 co-op construction video game

- Developer: Indoor Astronaut
- Publisher: Daedalic Entertainment
- Engine: MonoGame
- Platforms: Linux; macOS; Windows; Nintendo Switch; PlayStation 4; Xbox One
- Release: September 23, 2020; Xbox One; October 27, 2020
- Genre: Action
- Modes: Single-player; multiplayer

Unrailed! is a cooperative construction game developed by Swiss video game developer Indoor Astronaut, and published by Daedalic Entertainment. In China, the game is published by Bilibili.

The game initially entered early access on September 9, 2019, and was officially released on September 23, 2020 for Windows, macOS, Linux, PlayStation 4, and Nintendo Switch, and on October 27, 2020 for Xbox One.

A sequel, Unrailed 2: Back on Track, was announced on November 30, 2023, and released into early access on November 7, 2024. The full game was released for Windows, macOS, Nintendo Switch, Nintendo Switch 2, and PlayStation 5 on June 11, 2026.

== Gameplay ==
In Unrailed!, up to four players cooperate to create a railroad to keep a train from derailing en route to its destination. The game has five game modes: endless, versus, fast, sandbox, and time, which offer different objectives and challenges for players. Both local and online multiplayer is supported.

To lay down rails for the train, the players must extract resources from the environment. Wood and iron are obtained by chopping down trees and from blocks of stone. The game incorporates roguelike elements with procedurally generated terrain, resource management, and limited saves. Other obstacles include wildlife like cows and llamas that block the train's path, and non-player characters which are able to remove parts of the track from the main path. Each time the train arrives at a station, it can be upgraded with various improvements by buying them with bolts earned while playing. Upgrades enable exploration of new biomes and help the players extract materials more quickly.

== Development ==
Unrailed! was originally developed for a student project during the Game Programming Lab 2018 at ETH Zurich. At the end of the semester, the prototype received positive feedback from the jury and players at the final presentation. The project was selected to join the SwissGames delegation at Gamescom 2018 in Cologne.

Indoor Astronaut received support from the Ludicious Business Accelerator as well as Pro Helvetia. Pro Helvetia played a crucial role by allowing the development team to go to the Game Connection 2018 in Paris, where they met their future publisher, Daedalic Entertainment, who financed the rest of the development of Unrailed!, and took care of its promotion and distribution.

Originally planned for release in early access during summer 2019, the release was postponed after the developers met Chinese publisher Bilibili during GDC 2019 in San Francisco, with whom they signed a contract for the distribution of the game in China. This pushed the release date to September 2019.

The Xbox One and PlayStation 4 ports of the game were developed by the company Sickhead Games. However, the Nintendo Switch port was developed internally at Indoor Astronaut, because they wished to have more control over the quality of the game.

== Reception ==
Reception

Aggregate scores
Aggregator	Score
Metacritic	(PC) 77/100 (NS) 69/100
OpenCritic	61% recommend

Unrailed! received "generally favorable" reviews from critics for the Windows version of the game, while the Switch version received "mixed or average" reviews, according to review aggregator Metacritic. Fellow review aggregator OpenCritic assessed that the game received strong approval, being recommended by 61% of critics.

=== Awards ===
Unrailed! received multiple awards:

- Swiss Game Awards - Audience Choice Award (2020)
- Tapiei Game Show - Best Innovation Award (2020)
- Nomination for the Deutscher Computerspielpreis (2020)
- TOMMI Children Software Award, 3rd place (2019)
