= Ethan Josh Lee =

American actor

- Occupation: Actor
- Years active: 2010–present

Ethan Josh Lee (born 2001) is an American actor. He has appeared in the Wes Anderson film Asteroid City and the NBC sitcom Mr. Robinson. He is also known as "Ethan Lee".

== Education ==
Lee graduated from Calabasas High School and Stanford University, where he received the John Holland Slusser World Peace Prize.

== Career ==
Lee is best known for his roles as Ricky Cho in Wes Anderson's film Asteroid City and Quan Phook in the NBC sitcom Mr. Robinson, among other television and film projects. Additionally, he has appeared in national commercials for companies such as Cisco, McDonald's, General Mills, and Comcast.

== Filmography ==
Key
†	Denotes works that have not yet been released

Year	Title	Role	Details
2010	Southland	Matthew Chung	Episode: "U-Boat" (Guest Starring)
2010	Sons of Tucson	Boy #1	Episode: "Kisses and Beads" (Co Starring)
2010	Glee	Summer Camp Boy	Episode: "Audition" (Co Starring)
2011	Desperate Housewives	Water Glass Player	Episode: "Searching" (Co Starring)
2013	Mortal Kombat: Legacy	Young Hanzo Hasashi / Scorpion	2 Episodes (Guest Star)
2014	To Success	John Yum	Short film (Lead)
2014–2015	Mr. Robinson	Quan Phook	Recurring, 6 Episodes
2015	The Diabolical	Nerdy Kid	Film (Supporting)
2016	The Real O'Neals	Nerdy Boy	Episode: "The Real Retreat" (Co Starring)
2016	The Middle	Sang-Woo	Episode: "Find My Hecks" (Co Starring)
2017	The Bird Who Could Fly	Young Kenny	Short film (Lead)
2017	K.C. Undercover	Jin	Episode: "Revenge of the Van People" (Guest Starring)
2018	The Mick	Brian Chang	Episode: "The Graduate" (Guest Starring)
2020	Kajillionaire	Another Son	Film
2020	Songbird	Giffords	Film
2023	Asteroid City	Ricky	Film
