= Cop Out (2010 film) =

Film by Kevin Smith

- Theatrical release poster
- Directed by: Kevin Smith
- Written by: Robb Cullen; Mark Cullen
- Produced by: Marc Platt; Polly Johnsen; Michael Tadross
- Starring: Bruce Willis; Tracy Morgan; Adam Brody; Kevin Pollak; Guillermo Diaz; Seann William Scott
- Cinematography: David Klein
- Edited by: Kevin Smith
- Music by: Harold Faltermeyer
- Production companies: Warner Bros. Pictures; Marc Platt Productions
- Distributed by: Warner Bros. Pictures
- Release dates: February 22, 2010 (AMC Loews Lincoln Square 13); February 26, 2010 (United States)
- Running time: 107 minutes
- Country: United States
- Language: English
- Budget: $30 million
- Box office: $55.6 million

Cop Out is a 2010 American buddy cop action comedy film edited and directed by Kevin Smith and written by Robb and Mark Cullen. It is the only film in Smith's career that he directed without writing himself. The film stars Bruce Willis and Tracy Morgan as veteran NYPD detectives who become entangled in a case involving a stolen rare baseball card, which leads them into conflict with a memorabilia-obsessed gangster. The supporting cast includes Adam Brody, Kevin Pollak, Guillermo Diaz, and Seann William Scott.

Cop Out had its premiere at the AMC Loews Lincoln Square 13 in New York City, New York on February 22, 2010, and was released in the United States on February 26 by Warner Bros. Pictures. The film received negative reviews from critics and grossed $55.6 million against a budget of $30 million.

== Plot ==
Veteran NYPD detectives Jimmy Monroe and Paul Hodges are suspended following a failed robbery intervention that results in a reckless shootout. While under suspension, Jimmy faces financial stress as he attempts to pay for his daughter Ava's expensive wedding. Refusing assistance from Ava's wealthy stepfather, Roy (in exchange for Roy giving Ava away), Jimmy decides to sell his rare and valuable 1952 baseball card to cover the costs.

The card is stolen during a pawn shop robbery by career criminal Dave. After arresting him in a subsequent burglary attempt, Jimmy and Paul learn that the card has been sold to Poh Boy, a drug dealer with a passion for sports memorabilia. In exchange for the card, Poh Boy tasks the detectives with recovering a stolen vehicle. They track the car with the help of a young informant named Tommy but are soon pursued by Poh Boy's gang. The chase ends in a fatal crash that kills one of the gang members, Juan Diaz.

Inside the trunk of the recovered vehicle, Jimmy and Paul find Gabriela, the girlfriend of a murdered rival drug dealer. Poh Boy had planned to deliver her as a trophy. While hiding in a motel, Paul grows increasingly paranoid about his wife Debbie's fidelity after viewing ambiguous surveillance footage. Meanwhile, Gabriela sneaks out to protect them and is later captured by Poh Boy's men, who demand the return of a flash drive containing incriminating information.

Jimmy arranges for Dave's release to help recover the baseball card, but Dave is incapacitated during a break-in at Poh Boy's hideout. Jimmy attempts to retrieve the card himself but is caught when Poh Boy and his men return early from a funeral. Paul discovers that Debbie was not having an affair but had staged the situation using her gay cousin to provoke jealousy. The detectives regroup and devise a plan to draw Poh Boy's men away with a staged flash drive exchange at the Pulaski Bridge.

A shootout ensues when fellow detectives Barry Mangold and Ray Hunsaker arrive, resulting in Hunsaker being wounded. Jimmy and Paul confront Poh Boy, who is holding Gabriela at gunpoint. They manage to kill him and rescue her, but Paul's shot destroys Jimmy's baseball card during the altercation. The precinct reinstates both officers, commending them for their actions.

At the wedding, Jimmy reluctantly allows Roy to contribute financially. When asked to give Ava away, Roy is silently forced to sit by Paul at gunpoint, allowing Jimmy to walk his daughter down the aisle. In a post-credits scene, Dave regains consciousness in the morgue, startling a mortuary worker.

== Cast ==
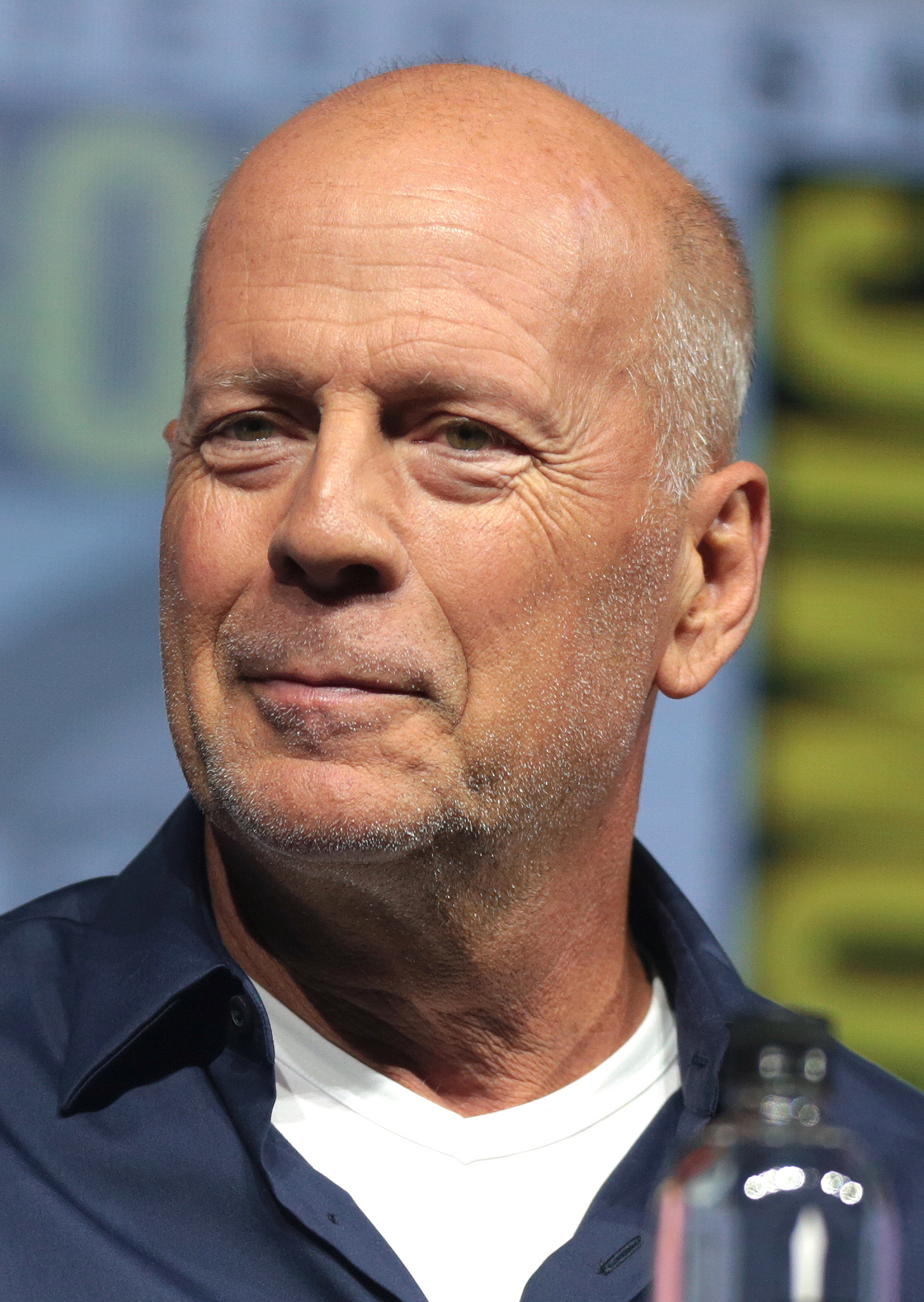
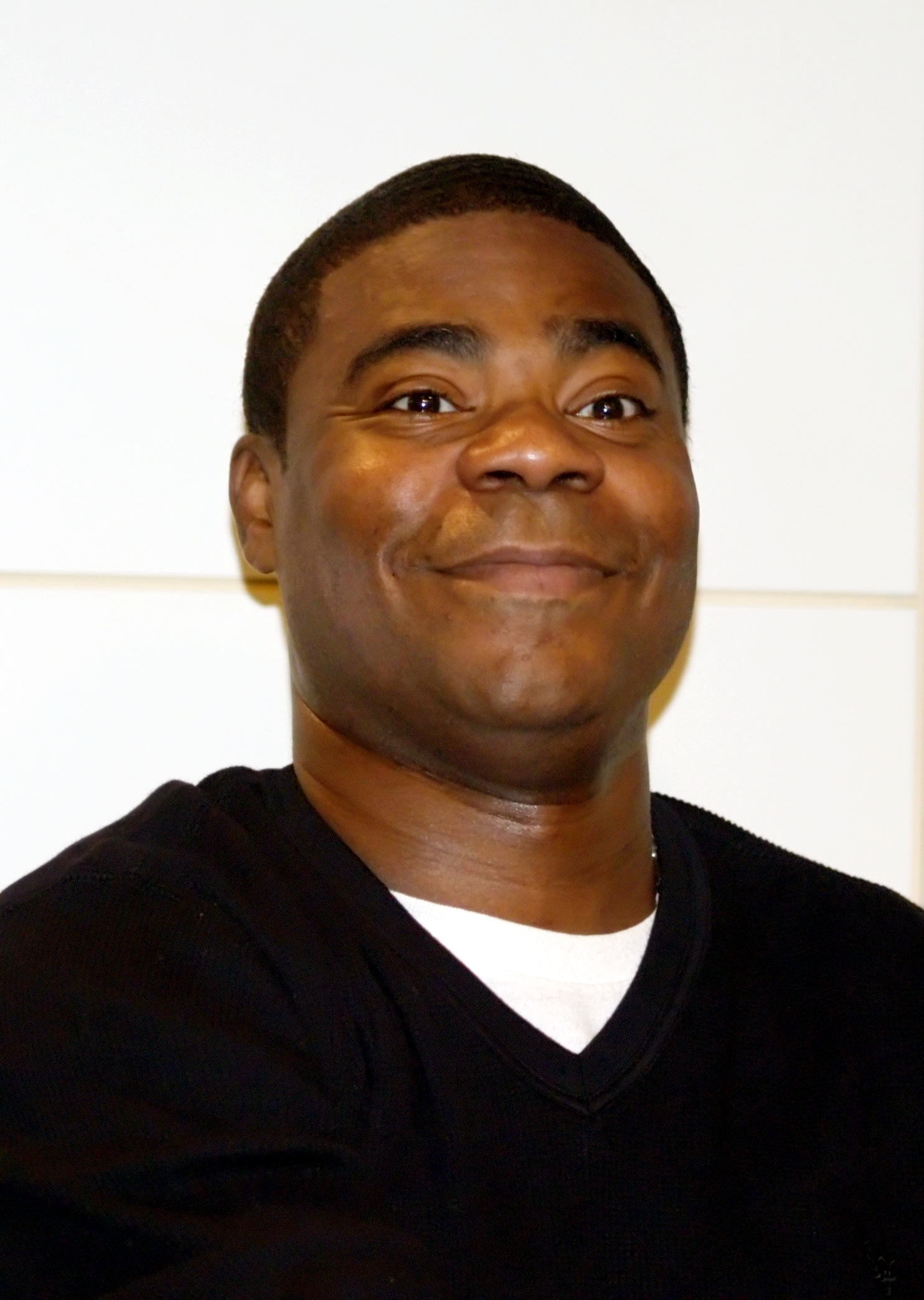
Actors Bruce Willis (left) and Tracy Morgan (right)
- Bruce Willis as Detective Jimmy Monroe
- Tracy Morgan as Detective Paul Hodges
- Adam Brody as Detective Barry Mangold
- Kevin Pollak as Detective Ray Hunsaker
- Guillermo Diaz as Poh Boy
- Seann William Scott as Dave
- Sean Cullen as Captain Jack Romans
- Jason Lee as Roy
- Rashida Jones as Debbie Hodges
- Adrian Martinez as Tino
- Cory Fernandez as Juan Diaz
- Michelle Trachtenberg as Ava Monroe
- Francie Swift as Pam
- Ana de la Reguera as Gabriela
- Jim Norton as George
- Marcus I. Morton as Tommy
- Mark Consuelos as Manuel

== Production ==
=== Development ===
[T]he Cullen brothers are dialogue crazy—the whole movie is like cops who are practically married but not actually, and, I mean, that's right up my alley. It's like Dante and Randal as cops.

— Kevin Smith, on why he wanted to direct the film

Cop Out originated as a spec script titled A Couple of Dicks by Mark and Robb Cullen, which appeared on the 2008 "Black List" of most-liked unproduced screenplays in Hollywood. The script underwent multiple title changes due to concerns about the original title's marketability. It was first renamed A Couple of Cops and eventually released as Cop Out, a title director Kevin Smith later acknowledged was a "cop out" from the original name. The film marked the first project Smith directed without writing the script himself.

Warner Bros. requested that Smith storyboard the entire film in advance, a request he fulfilled with cinematographer David Klein. They reviewed the storyboards with the studio two months before filming began.

=== Casting ===
Smith accepted a reduced salary to work on the film, citing the opportunity to direct Bruce Willis as a key reason for his involvement. The film stars Willis and Tracy Morgan as NYPD partners, with supporting roles played by Adam Brody, Kevin Pollak, Guillermo Diaz and Seann William Scott. Will Ferrell and Mark Wahlberg were originally attached to the movie, but they left and instead made The Other Guys.

However, the production was marred by reported tensions between Smith and Willis. On a 2011 episode of WTF with Marc Maron, Smith expressed deep frustration with Willis's behavior on set, saying that Willis refused to participate in promotional activities and contributed to a difficult work environment. In contrast, Smith praised Morgan's enthusiasm and commitment. A talent representative described Smith's directing style as disengaged, claiming he spent most of his time behind the monitor and did not interact much with the cast. Smith later defended his approach, attributing his productivity to marijuana use, which he claimed became a central part of his creative process after observing actor Seth Rogen's habits on the set of Zack and Miri Make a Porno (2008).

Following Willis's 2022 retirement from acting due to aphasia, Smith issued a public apology for his past criticisms of Willis.

=== Filming ===
Principal photography began on June 2, 2009, in New York City and concluded on August 14, 2009. The film had a production budget of $37 million and was released theatrically on February 26, 2010, by Warner Bros. Pictures.

== Release ==
=== Marketing ===
The first theatrical trailer for Cop Out was released on December 23, 2009, and was subsequently attached to screenings of Sherlock Holmes. A red-band trailer featuring more explicit content was released online on February 5, 2010. In the lead-up to its release, the film received widespread promotional exposure, including prominent advertising during NBC's coverage of the 2010 Winter Olympic Games.

=== Theatrical ===
Cop Out was released theatrically in the United States on February 26, 2010, by Warner Bros. Pictures.

=== Home media ===
Warner Home Video announced the film's home media release in May 2010, with DVD and Blu-ray editions made available on July 20, 2010. The film debuted as the top-selling DVD in the United States during its release week in July.

== Reception ==
=== Box office ===
Cop Out grossed $44.9 million in the United States and Canada, and $7.4 million in other territories, for a worldwide total of $55.4 million, against a production budget of $30 million. The film debuted at number two at the U.S. box office behind Shutter Island, earning $18.2 million during its opening weekend.

=== Critical response ===
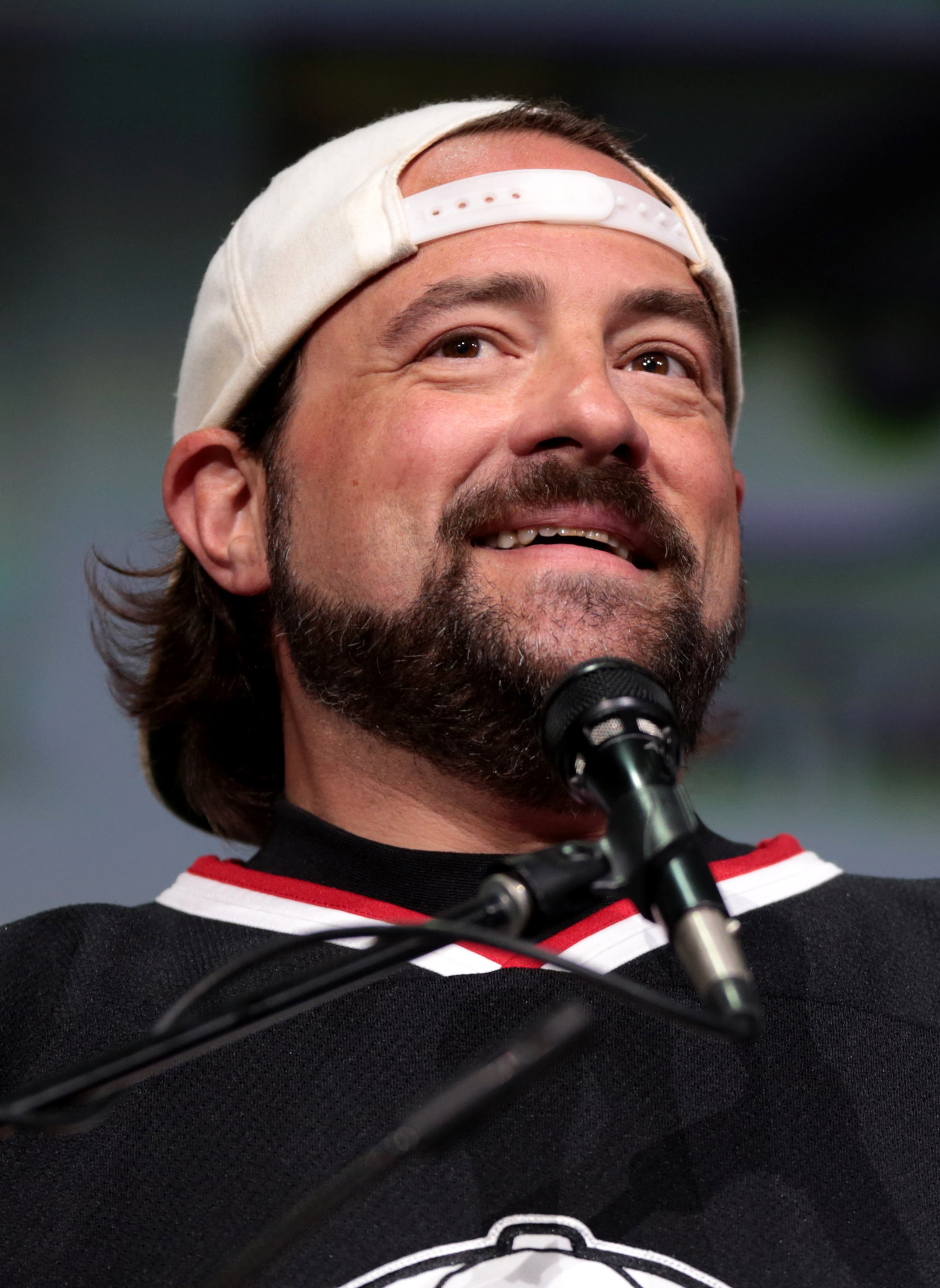
Director Kevin Smith denounced the negative reviews from critics.

The film received generally negative reviews from critics. On Rotten Tomatoes, it holds an approval rating of 18% based on 163 reviews, with an average rating of 3.90/10. The website's consensus reads, "Cop Out is a cliched buddy action/comedy that suffers from stale gags and slack pacing." On Metacritic, the film has a weighted average score of 31 out of 100, based on 35 critics, indicating "generally unfavorable reviews". Audiences polled by CinemaScore gave the film an average grade of "B−" on an A+ to F scale.

Roger Ebert of the Chicago Sun-Times awarded the film 1.5 out of 4 stars, stating, "Many of the gags possibly looked good on paper, but watching Willis and Morgan struggle with them is like watching third graders do Noël Coward—if Noël Coward had been rewritten by Kevin Smith." Stephen Whitty of The Star-Ledger, in his review of the similarly themed but more critically acclaimed The Other Guys (2010), remarked, "Measured against this year's other police farce—remember Cop Out?—it looks absolutely heroic."

Betsy Sharkey of Los Angeles Times gave the film a 3.5 out of 5 rating and said, "It's the first gross-out comedy to come along since The Hangover that is actually a comedy and not just gross, although make no mistake, gross it is -- this is a Kevin Smith film after all -- so don't say you weren't warned." In a 2 out of 5 review, Charlotte O'Sullivan of London Evening Standard stated that "it could have been a match made in heaven. The snake in the garden is a tired script from Rob and Mark Cullen, which purports to "spoof" Eighties buddy movies (Beverly Hills Cop, Lethal Weapon, etc) but lacks any real brain power of its own."

=== Reaction from Kevin Smith ===
Following the film's negative reviews, director Kevin Smith publicly criticized film critics on Twitter. In one widely reported post, Smith wrote, "Writing a nasty review for Cop Out is akin to bullying a retarded kid. All you've done is make fun of something that wasn't doing you any harm and wanted only to give some cats some fun laughs." He further suggested that critics should be charged for advance screenings of his future films, a statement that drew backlash from film journalists who described the sentiment as "dishonest" and "disingenuous". In response, Ebert tweeted, "Kevin Smith thinks critics should have had to pay to see Cop Out. But Kev, then they would REALLY have hated it."
