= Video game programming =

Subset of game development

Game programming, a subset of game development, is the software development of video games. Game programming requires substantial skills in software engineering, computer programming in a given language, and expertise in one or more following area: simulation, computer graphics, artificial intelligence, physics, audio programming, and input. For multiplayer games, knowledge of network programming is required (the resultant code, in addition to its performance characteristics, is commonly referred to as the game's netcode by players and programmers alike). In some genres, e.g., fighting games, advanced network programming is often demanded, as the netcode and its properties (e.g., latency) are considered by players and critics to be some of the most important metrics of the game's quality. For massively multiplayer online games (MMOGs), even further knowledge of database programming and advanced networking programming are required. Though often engaged in by professional game programmers, there is a thriving scene of independent developers who lack a relationship with a publishing company.

== Development process ==
Professional game development usually begins with a game design, which itself has several possible origins. Occasionally the game development process starts with no clear design in mind, but as a series of experiments. For example, game designer Will Wright began development of The Sims by getting programmers to experiment with several ideas.

=== Prototyping ===
Programmers are often required to produce prototypes of gameplay ideas and features. A great deal of prototyping may take place during pre-production, before the design document is complete, and may help determine what features the design specifies.

Prototypes are developed quickly with very little time for up-front design and mostly act as a proof of concept or to test ideas. They are not expected to work flawlessly, but are developed to try out new, sometimes exotic, ideas.

=== Game design ===
Though the programmer's main job is not to develop the game design, the programmers often contribute to the design, as do game artists. The game designer will solicit input from both the producer and the art and programming lead for ideas and strategies for the game design. Often individuals in non-lead positions also contribute, such as copywriters and other programmers and artists.

Programmers often closely follow the game design document. As the game development progresses, the design document changes as programming limits and new abilities are discovered and exploited.

=== Production ===
During production, programmers may create a great deal of source code to create the game described in the game's design document. Along the way, the design document is modified to meet limits or expanded to exploit new features. The design document is very much a "living document", much of whose life is dictated by programmer's schedules, talent and resourcefulness.

While many programmers have some say in a game's content, most game producers solicit input from the lead programmer as to the status of a game programming development. The lead is responsible for knowing the status of all facets of the game's programming and for identifying limits. The lead programmer may also pass on suggestions from the programmers as to possible features they'd like to implement.

With today's visually rich content, the programmer must often interact with the art staff. This very much depends on the programmer's role, of course. For example, a 3D graphics programmer may need to work with the game's 3D modelers discussing strategies and design considerations, while an AI programmer may need to interact very little, if at all, with the art staff. To help artists and level designers with their tasks, programmers may volunteer or be called on to develop tools and utilities. Many of these may be for a specific purpose and can be buggy due to time constraints (time for development of such tools is often not included in a game's schedule) as well as because they are only for in-house use anyway. Many game tools are developed in rapid application development (RAD) languages for quicker development and may be discarded after the completion of the game.

=== Testing ===
The formal quality assurance testing process, performed by professional game testers, begins well into game development. High-budget titles may begin testing with the first playable alpha, while low-budget and casual games might not enter testing until a release candidate is ready. The programmers' task is to fix errors and bugs as such are discovered by the QA teams.

=== Nearing completion ===
Final tasks include "polishing" the game, such as programmers fixing occasional bugs—from minor to catastrophic—that may arise during the last phases of testing.

Game developers may have a beta testing period, but the definition of such varies from developer to developer. Often a beta contains all of the game's features, but may have a few bugs or incomplete content. Few games are given a public beta period, for example, to measure stress tolerance for game servers.

When the game is deemed complete, it is said to have "gone gold" and is shipped off to the publisher. Depending on circumstances, the publisher may then subject it to its own quality assurance or may begin pressing the game from the gold master.

=== Maintenance ===
Once a game ships, the maintenance phase for the video game begins. Programmers wait for a period to get as many bug reports as possible. Once the developer thinks they've obtained enough feedback, the programmers start working on a patch. The patch may take weeks or months to develop, but it's intended to fix most bugs and problems with the game. Occasionally a patch may include extra features or content or may even alter gameplay.

=== Duration ===
Most modern games take from one to three years to complete. The length of development depends on a number of factors, but programming is required throughout all phases of development except the very early stages of game design.

== Tools ==
Like other software, game development programs are generated from source code to the actual program (called the executable) by a compiler. Source code can be developed with almost any text editor, but many professional game programmers use a full integrated development environment. Once again, which IDE one uses depends on the target platform.

In addition to IDEs, many game development companies create custom tools developed to be used in-house. Some of these include prototypes and asset conversion tools (programs that change artwork, for example, into the game's custom format). Some custom tools may even be delivered with the game, such as a level editor.

Game development companies often invest in high-quality equipment and multiple systems to support their programming staff. A standard workstation often includes two to three development systems and multiple monitors in their office or cubicle.

=== Programming languages ===
Language	Features
Assembly	Potentially minimal CPU overhead
C	Widely known, widely portable, many APIs, compiles to machine code
C++	Object-oriented, widely known, many APIs, compiles to machine code
Java	Object-oriented, garbage-collected, widely portable (via a virtual machine)
C#, Visual Basic (.NET), etc.	Object-oriented, garbage-collected, interfaces with Microsoft products
Objective-C, Swift	Object-oriented, interfaces with Apple products
Lua, Python, JavaScript, Tcl, etc.	Familiar syntax, easily embedded in the above languages, often used for scripting
Lisp, Pascal, Perl, Smalltalk, etc.	Fringe game languages, although bindings to popular libraries are common

Once the game's initial design has been agreed on, the development language must be decided on. The choice depends on many factors, such as language familiarity of the programming staff, target platforms, execution speed needs, the language of any game engines, application programming interfaces (APIs), and libraries being used.

For personal computers, the language selected may be little more than a matter of preference. Language bindings for popular libraries such as Simple DirectMedia Layer (SDL) and Allegro are widespread, and the performance gap between idiomatic code written in modern compiled languages is negligible. The most popular languages are usually procedural or object-oriented and implemented via compilers; for example, C, C++, and Java. However, developers may take into account domain-specific features, such as interfacing with the operating system, and resilience to reverse engineering for online video games. Many games are not written in one language exclusively, and may combine two or more languages; For example, Unity, a popular game engine, has different pieces written in C, C++, and C#.

For consoles, the support of the target platform is usually the most considered factor. In the past, video games for consoles were written almost exclusively in assembly due to limited resources in terms of both storage and processing speed. However, as technology has advanced, so have the options for game development on consoles. Nintendo, Microsoft, and Sony all have differing software development kits (SDKs) for their Nintendo Switch, Xbox One, and PlayStation 4 consoles, respectively.

High-level scripting languages are increasingly being used as embedded extensions to the underlying game written in a compiled programming language, for the convenience of both the original developer and anyone who would wish to mod the game. Lua is a very popular choice, as its API is written in ANSI C and the language is designed to be embedded into other applications. Many developers have created custom languages altogether for their games, such as id Software's QuakeC and Epic Games' UnrealScript.

=== APIs and libraries ===
A key decision in game programming is which, if any, APIs and libraries to use. Today, many libraries exist which handle key tasks of game programming. Some libraries can handle sound processing, input, and graphics rendering. Some can even handle some artificial intelligence (AI) tasks such as pathfinding. There are even entire game engines that handle most of the tasks of game programming and only require coding game logic.

Which APIs and libraries one chooses depends largely on the target platform. For example, libraries for PlayStation 2 development may not be available for Microsoft Windows and vice versa. However, there are game frameworks available that allow or ease cross-platform development, so programmers can program a game in one language and have the game run on several platforms, such as the Wii, PlayStation 3, Xbox 360, PSP and Microsoft Windows.

==== Graphic APIs ====
Graphics API use across operating systems
OS	Vulkan	Direct X	GNMX	Metal
Windows 10	Yes	Yes	No	No
Mac	MoltenVK	No	No	Yes
Linux	Yes	No	No	No
Android	Yes	Yes	Yes	No
iOS	MoltenVK	No	Yes	Yes
Tizen	developing	No	No	No
Sailfish	developing	No	No	No
Xbox One	No	Yes	No	No
Orbis OS (PS4)	No	No	Yes	No
Nintendo Switch	Yes	No	No	No

Today, graphics are a key defining feature of most games. While 2D graphics used to be the norm for games released through the mid-1990s, most AAA games now boast full 3D graphics, even for games which are largely 2D in nature, such as Civilization III. However, purely 2D graphics have experienced a Renaissance with indie games.

The two most popular 3D graphics APIs for Microsoft Windows are Direct3D and OpenGL. The benefits and weaknesses of each API are hotly debated among Windows video game programmers.

Currently, the most popular Computing platform is Google Android. Since it comes pre-installed on almost eighty percent of Smartphones sold, Android has the second largest user base, and increasing. Android uses OpenGL ES & Vulkan (API).

DirectX is a collection of game APIs. Direct3D is DirectX's 3D API. Direct3D is freely available from Microsoft, as are the rest of the DirectX APIs. Microsoft developed DirectX for game programmers and continues to add features to the API. The DirectX specification is not controlled by an open arbitration committee and Microsoft is free to add, remove or change features. Direct3D is not portable; it is designed specifically for Microsoft Windows and no other platform (though a form of Direct3D is used on Microsoft's Xbox, Windows Phone 7.5 smartphones and mobile devices which run the Pocket PC operating system).

OpenGL is a portable API specification. Code written with OpenGL is easily ported between platforms with a compatible implementation. For example, Quake II, which uses OpenGL, was ported from Windows to Linux by a fan of the game. OpenGL is a standard maintained by the OpenGL Architecture Review Board (ARB). The ARB meets periodically to update the standard by adding emerging support for features of the latest 3D hardware. In addition, the development tools provided by the manufacturers of some video game consoles (such as the Nintendo GameCube, the Nintendo DS, and the PSP) use graphic APIs that resemble OpenGL. OpenGL often lags behind on feature updates due to the lack of a permanent development team and the requirement that implementations begin development after the standard has been published. Programmers who choose to use it can access some hardware's latest 3D features, but only through non-standardized extensions. The situation may change in the future as the OpenGL architecture review board (ARB) has passed control of the specification to the Khronos Group in an attempt to counter the problem.

==== Other APIs ====
For development on Microsoft Windows, the various APIs of DirectX may be used for input, sound effects, music, networking and the playback of videos. Many commercial libraries are available to accomplish these tasks, but since DirectX is available for free, it is the most widely used.

For console programming, the console manufacturers provide facilities for rendering graphics and the other tasks of game development. The console manufacturers also provide complete development systems, without which one cannot legally market nor develop games for their system. Third-party developers also sell toolkits or libraries that ease the development on one or more of these tasks or provide special benefits, such as cross-platform development abilities.

== Game structure ==
The central component of any game, from a programming standpoint, is the game loop. The game loop allows the game to run smoothly regardless of a user's input or lack thereof.

Most traditional software programs respond to user input and do nothing without it. For example, a word processor formats words and text as a user types. If the user doesn't type anything, the word processor does nothing. Some functions may take a long time to complete, but all are initiated by a user telling the program to do something.

Games, on the other hand, must continue to operate regardless of a user's input. The game loop allows this. A highly simplified game loop, in pseudocode, might look something like this :

while (user does not exit)
    check for user input
    run AI
    move enemies
    resolve collisions
    draw graphics
    play sounds
end while

The loop may be refined and modified as game development progresses, but most games are based on this basic idea.

Game loops differ depending on the platform they are developed for. For example, games written for DOS and many consoles can dominate and exploit available processing resources without restraint. However, games for a modern PC operating system such as Microsoft Windows must operate within the constraints of the process scheduler. Some modern games run multiple threads so that, for example, the computation of character AI can be decoupled from the generation of smooth motion within the game. This has the disadvantage of (slightly) increased overhead, but the game may run more smoothly and efficiently on hyper-threading or multi-core processors and on multiprocessing platforms. With the computer industry's focus on central processing units (CPUs) with more cores that can execute more threads, this is becoming increasingly important. Consoles like the Xbox 360 and PlayStation 3 already have more than one core per processor, and execute more than one thread per core.

== Hobbyists ==
The only platforms widely available for hobbyists to program are consumer operating systems, such as Android, iOS, Windows, Mac, Linux, etc. This is because development on game consoles requires special development systems that cost thousands of dollars. Often these must be obtained from the console manufacturer and are only sold or leased to professional game development studios. However, Microsoft used to distribute a game development framework, XNA, which runs on both Microsoft Windows and Xbox 360. XNA was discontinued, but other projects like MonoGame and SharpDX are trying to allow the same access for game coding. Some hobbyists also develop homebrew games, especially for handheld systems or modded consoles.

Some software engineering students program games as exercises for learning a programming language or operating system.

Some hobbyists may use software packages that help with game development, such as Adobe Animate, Unity, Android Studio, pygame, Adventure Game Studio, Roblox Studio, GameMaker Studio, Godot, Unreal Engine, Pixel Game Maker MV, or Construct.

== See also ==
- List of gaming topics
