= List of PlayStation Vita games (S) =

== Games list (S) ==
There are currently 1731 games across the lists of PlayStation Vita games.

For a chronological list, click the sort button in any of the available region's columns. Games dated December 17, 2011 (JP), February 15, 2012 (NA), and February 22, 2012 (EU) are launch titles of each region respectively.

Title	Genre(s)	Developer(s)	Publisher(s)	Release date			PS TV compat.	Ref.
Title	Genre(s)	Developer(s)	Publisher(s)	North America	Europe	Japan	PS TV compat.	Ref.
SA7: Silent Ability Seven	Otome game	Petit Reve	Future Tech Lab	Unreleased	Unreleased	May 26, 2016	No	
Scared Rider Xechs Rev.	Otome game	Red Entertainment	Rejet	Unreleased	Unreleased	Nov 19, 2015	No	
Saenai Kanojo (Heroine) no Sodatekata: Blessing Flowers	Visual novel	Guyzware, 5pb.	5pb.	Unreleased	Unreleased	Apr 30, 2015	Yes	
SaGa: Scarlet Grace	Role-playing	Square Enix	Square Enix	Unreleased	Unreleased	Dec 15, 2016	No	
Sakaagari Hurricane Portable	Visual novel	Giga	Entergram	Unreleased	Unreleased	Oct 27, 2016	Yes	
Sakatsuku: Pro Soccer Club o Tsukurou!	Simulation	Sega	Sega	Unreleased	Unreleased	Oct 10, 2013	No	
Saki: Zenkoku-hen	Visual novel	Kaga Create	Kaga Create	Unreleased	Unreleased	Sep 17, 2015	Yes	
Saki: Zenkoku-hen Plus (Note: Update for Saki: Zenkoku-hen.)	Visual novel	Kaga Create	Kaga Create	Unreleased	Unreleased	Dec 22, 2016	Yes	
Sakura Sakura	Visual novel	Hiqo Soft	Entergram	Unreleased	Unreleased	Oct 25, 2018	Yes	
Sakurasou no Pet na Kanojo	Visual novel	Netchubiyori	Kadokawa Games	Unreleased	Unreleased	Feb 14, 2013	Yes	
Salt and Sanctuary	Action role-playing	Ska Studios, Sickhead Games	Ska Studios	Mar 28, 2017	Mar 28, 2017	Apr 13, 2017	Yes	
Samurai & Dragons	Action role-playing	Sega	Sega	Unreleased	Unreleased	Mar 29, 2012	No	
Samurai Shodown V Special	Fighting	Yuki Enterprise, Code Mystics	SNK	Sep 12, 2017	Sep 12, 2017	Sep 12, 2017	No	
Samurai Warriors 4	Hack and slash	Omega Force	Tecmo Koei	Oct 21, 2014	Oct 24, 2014	Mar 20, 2014	Yes	
Samurai Warriors 4-II (Note: Update for Samurai Warriors 4.)	Hack and slash	Omega Force	Koei Tecmo	Sep 29, 2015	Oct 2, 2015	Feb 11, 2015	Yes	
Samurai Warriors 4: Empires (Note: Stand-alone expansion for Samurai Warriors 4.)	Hack and slash	Omega Force	Koei Tecmo	Mar 15, 2016	Mar 11, 2016	Sep 17, 2015	Yes	
Samurai Warriors: Chronicles 3	Hack and slash	Omega Force	Koei Tecmo	Jun 30, 2015	Jun 24, 2015	Dec 4, 2014	Yes	
Samurai Warriors: Sanada Maru	Hack and slash	Omega Force	Koei Tecmo	Unreleased	Unreleased	Nov 23, 2016	Yes	
San Goku Shi 12 Taisenban	Role-playing	Koei Tecmo Games	Koei Tecmo Games	Unreleased	Unreleased	Sep 26, 2013	No	
Sangoku Hime 2: Tenka Hatō: Shishi no Keishōsha	Turn-based strategy	Gessen 18	SystemSoft Alpha	Unreleased	Unreleased	Jun 27, 2013	Yes	
Sangoku Hime 4: Tenge Ryōran: Tenmei no Koi Emaki	Turn-based strategy	Gessen 18	SystemSoft Alpha	Unreleased	Unreleased	May 26, 2016	Yes	
Sangoku Rensenki: Otome no Heihō!	Otome game; Quiz	Daisy2	Prototype	Unreleased	Unreleased	Apr 25, 2013	Yes	
Sangoku Rensenki: Otome no Heihō! Omoide Gaeshi CS Edition	Otome game	Daisy2	Prototype	Unreleased	Unreleased	Feb 4, 2016	Yes	
Sanzen Sekai Yūgi: ReMulti Universe Myself	Otome game	girls dynamics	Dramatic Create	Unreleased	Unreleased	Sep 27, 2018	Yes	
Saturday Morning RPG	Role-playing	Mighty Rabbit Studios	Mighty Rabbit Studios	Jan 26, 2016	Unreleased	Unreleased	Yes	
Save the Ninja Clan	Platform	Willz, Sometimes You	Sometimes You	Oct 6, 2017	Oct 6, 2017	Unreleased	Yes	
Sayonara Umihara Kawase Plus	Platform	Agatsuma Entertainment	Agatsuma Entertainment	Apr 21, 2015	Apr 30, 2015	Apr 23, 2015	Yes	
School Wars: Zenkan Pack Honpen & Sotsugyō Sensen	Otome game; Mini-games	QuinRose	QuinRose	Unreleased	Unreleased	Jun 25, 2015	Yes	
Scintillatron 4096	Shooter	kFunction Ltd.	kFunction Ltd.	Dec 18, 2018	Unreleased	Unreleased	No	
Scram Kitty DX	Shooter	Dakko Dakko	Dakko Dakko	Mar 10, 2015	Feb 25, 2015	Unreleased	Yes	
ScourgeBringer	Platform	Flying Oak Games	Dear Villagers	Apr 22, 2021	Apr 22, 2021	Unreleased	No	
SD Gundam G Generation Genesis	Tactical role-playing	Tom Create	Bandai Namco Games	Unreleased	Unreleased	Nov 22, 2016	Yes	
Secret of Mana	Action role-playing	Square Enix	Square Enix	Feb 15, 2018	Feb 15, 2018	Feb 15, 2018	No	
Sekai Seifuku: Costume Fes	Card battle	Spike Chunsoft	Spike Chunsoft	Unreleased	Unreleased	Jul 23, 2014	No	
Semispheres	Puzzle	Vivid Helix	Vivid Helix	Oct 10, 2017	Oct 11, 2017	Oct 12, 2017	Yes	
Sengoku Hime 3: Tenka o Kirisaku Hika to Kage	Turn-based strategy	Gessen 18	SystemSoft Alpha	Unreleased	Unreleased	Jan 31, 2013	Yes	
Sengoku Hime 4: Sōhai Hyakkei, Hana Mamoru Chikai	Turn-based strategy	Gessen 18	SystemSoft Alpha	Unreleased	Unreleased	Jun 19, 2014	Yes	
Sengoku Hime 5: Senka Tatsu Haō No Keifu	Turn-based strategy	Gessen 18	SystemSoft Alpha	Unreleased	Unreleased	Dec 11, 2014	No	
Sengoku Hime 7: Sen'un Tsuranuku Guren no Ishi	Turn-based strategy	Gessen 18	SystemSoft Alpha	Unreleased	Unreleased	Oct 11, 2018	No	
Sengoku Musou 2 Empires HD Version (Note: Stand-alone expansion for Samurai Warriors 2. The original game is included in the Vita release of Sengoku Musou 2 with Moushouden HD Version.)	Hack and slash	Omega Force	Koei Tecmo Games	Unreleased	Unreleased	Oct 24, 2013	No	
Sengoku Musou 2 with Moushouden HD Version	Hack and slash	Omega Force	Koei Tecmo Games	Unreleased	Unreleased	Oct 24, 2013	No	
Sengoku Otome: Legend Battle	Beat 'em up	Shirogumi New Media Development	Planet G	Unreleased	Unreleased	Aug 25, 2016	Yes	
Sengoku Shura Soul	Role-playing	Creek and River	Lions Films	Unreleased	Unreleased	Oct 13, 2016	No	
Sengo Muramasa DX: Guren no Kettō	Turn-based strategy	Gesen 18	SystemSoft Alpha	Unreleased	Unreleased	Oct 26, 2017	Yes	
Senjō no Waltz	Otome game	Otomate	Idea Factory	Unreleased	Unreleased	Nov 20, 2014	Yes	
Sen no Hatō, Tsukisome no Kōki	Visual novel	August	Aria	Unreleased	Unreleased	Dec 21, 2017	Yes	
Senran Kagura: Bon Appétit! •Senran Kagura: Bon Appétit! - Full Course	Rhythm	Meteorise	Marvelous AQL (JP/EU); Xseed Games (NA)	Nov 11, 2014	Nov 12, 2014	Mar 20, 2014	Yes	
Senran Kagura Estival Versus	Beat 'em up	Tamsoft	Marvelous (JP/EU); Xseed Games (NA)	Mar 18, 2016	Mar 18, 2016	Mar 26, 2015	Yes	
Senran Kagura Shinovi Versus	Beat 'em up	Tamsoft	Marvelous AQL (JP/EU); Xseed Games (NA)	Oct 14, 2014	Oct 15, 2014	Feb 28, 2013	Yes	
Sense: A Cyberpunk Ghost Story	Adventure	Suzaku	Top Hat Studios Inc, EastAsiaSoft	Feb 12, 2021	Feb 12, 2021	Feb 12, 2021	No	
Seven Days: Anata to Sugosu Nanokakan	Visual novel	0Life	Prototype	Unreleased	Unreleased	Jul 5, 2018	Yes	
Severed	Action	DrinkBox Studios	DrinkBox Studios	Apr 26, 2016	Apr 26, 2016	Oct 6, 2016	No	
Shake Spears!	Action	Wake Up Studios	Alawar Entertainment	Jan 13, 2015	Nov 12, 2014	Unreleased	No	
Shakedown: Hawaii	Action-adventure	Vblank Entertainment	Vblank Entertainment	May 7, 2019	May 7, 2019	Unreleased	Yes	
Shantae: Half-Genie Hero	Platform	WayForward Technologies	WayForward Technologies; Xseed Games	Dec 20, 2016	Dec 20, 2016	Dec 20, 2016	Yes	
Shikihime no Niwa	Action	Appirits	Appirits	Unreleased	Unreleased	Mar 1, 2018	No	
Shin Gundam Musou	Hack and slash	Omega Force	Tecmo Koei	Unreleased	Unreleased	Dec 19, 2013	Yes	
Shin Hayarigami	Visual novel	Nippon Ichi Software	Nippon Ichi Software	Unreleased	Unreleased	Aug 7, 2014	Yes	
Shin Hayarigami 2	Visual novel	Nippon Ichi Software	Nippon Ichi Software	Unreleased	Unreleased	Jul 7, 2016	Yes	
Shin Kamaitachi no Yoru	Visual novel	Chunsoft	Chunsoft	Unreleased	Unreleased	Dec 17, 2011	No	
Shinigami to Shoujo	Visual novel	Takuyo	Takuyo	Unreleased	Unreleased	Jul 25, 2019	No	
Shinobiashi	Action	Planet G	Planet G	Unreleased	Unreleased	Oct 31, 2013	No	
Shinobido 2: Revenge of Zen	Stealth	Acquire	Bandai Namco Games	Feb 15, 2012	Feb 22, 2012	Dec 17, 2011	Yes	
Shinobi, Koi Utsutsu: Kanmitsu Hana Emaki	Otome game	Otomate	Idea Factory	Unreleased	Unreleased	Sep 28, 2017	Yes	
Shinobi, Koi Utsutsu: Setsugetsuka Koi Emaki	Otome game	Otomate	Idea Factory	Unreleased	Unreleased	Jun 25, 2015	Yes	
Shinsō-ban Crimson Empire	Otome game; Simulation	QuinRose	QuinRose	Unreleased	Unreleased	Apr 23, 2015	Yes	
Shinsō-ban Heart no Kuni no Alice: Wonderful Wonder World	Otome game	QuinRose	QuinRose	Unreleased	Unreleased	Jul 30, 2015	Yes	
Shinsō-ban Mahōtsukai to Goshujin-sama	Otome game	QuinRose	QuinRose	Unreleased	Unreleased	Jun 18, 2015	Yes	
Shinsō-ban Okashi na Shima no Peter Pan	Otome game	QuinRose	QuinRose	Unreleased	Unreleased	Mar 26, 2015	Yes	
Shitsuji ga Aruji o Erabu Toki	Visual novel	Daidai Inc., PeasSoft	TGL	Unreleased	Unreleased	Feb 25, 2016	No	
Shiren the Wanderer: The Tower of Fortune and the Dice of Fate	Roguelike	Spike Chunsoft	JP: Spike Chunsoft; WW: Aksys Games	Jul 26, 2016	Jul 26, 2016	Jun 4, 2015	Yes	
Shirogane × Spirits!	Visual novel	Giga	Technical Group Laboratory	Unreleased	Unreleased	Mar 24, 2016	Yes	
Shiro to Kuro no Alice	Otome game	Kogado Studio	Idea Factory	Unreleased	Unreleased	Jun 8, 2017	Yes	
Shiro to Kuro no Alice - Twilight Line -	Otome game	Kogado Studio	Idea Factory	Unreleased	Unreleased	Nov 15, 2018	Yes	
Shōjo to Dragon Genjū Keiyaku Cryptract	Role-playing	Lions Film	Lions Film	Unreleased	Unreleased	Jul 21, 2016	No	
Shovel Knight	Platform	Yacht Club Games	Yacht Club Games	Apr 21, 2015	Apr 23, 2015	Apr 8, 2015	Yes	
Shu	Platform	Coatsink Software	Coatsink Software	May 30, 2017	Jun 7, 2017	Jun 15, 2017	No	
Shutshimi Seriously Swole	Shooter	Neon Deity Games	Choice Provisions	Aug 25, 2015	Apr 5, 2016	Unreleased	Yes	
Side Kicks!	Otome game	Extend, Toybox Inc.	Extend	Unreleased	Unreleased	Mar 23, 2017	Yes	
Sigi: A Fart for Melusina	Platform	Pixel.lu	Sometimes You	Sep 7, 2018	Sep 7, 2018	Unreleased	No	
Silent Hill: Book of Memories	Hack and slash	WayForward Technologies	Konami	Oct 15, 2012	Oct 26, 2012	Feb 14, 2013	No	
Silverio Vendetta: Verse of Orpheus	Visual novel	Light	Light	Unreleased	Unreleased	Mar 31, 2016	Yes	
Silverio Trinity	Visual novel	Light	Light	Unreleased	Unreleased	Mar 28, 2019	No	
Simple V Series Vol. 1: The Docodemo Gal Mahjong	Mahjong	Tamsoft	D3 Publisher	Unreleased	Unreleased	Apr 30, 2014	Yes	
Simple V Series Vol. 2: The Tōsō Highway Fullboost: Nagoya–Tokyo Gekisō 4-jikan	Action	Tamsoft	D3 Publisher	Unreleased	Unreleased	Apr 30, 2014	Yes	
Sine Mora	Shoot 'em up	Digital Reality, Grasshopper Manufacture	Digital Reality	Nov 20, 2012	Nov 21, 2012	Unreleased	No	
Siralim	Role-playing	Thylacine Studios	Thylacine Studios	Feb 9, 2016	Mar 2, 2016	Unreleased	No	
Siralim 2	Role-playing	Thylacine Studios	Thylacine Studios	Mar 14, 2017	Mar 14, 2017	Unreleased	No	
Sir Eatsalot	Adventure, platform	Behind the Stone	EastAsiaSoft	Apr 3, 2018	Apr 3, 2018	Apr 6, 2018	No	
Skeleton Rider	Racing	iSquared Games Ltd	iSquared Games Ltd	Unreleased	Jul 9, 2014	Unreleased	Yes	
Sketchcross	Puzzle	Spiky Fish Games	Spiky Fish Games	Apr 27, 2015	Unreleased	Unreleased	Yes	
Skullgirls 2nd Encore	Fighting	Lab Zero Games	Autumn Games (NA/EU); Arc System Works (JP)	Apr 5, 2016	Apr 11, 2016	Mar 10, 2016	Yes (1-2 players)	
SkullPirates	Action	Arcade Distillery	EastAsiaSoft	Oct 8, 2021	Oct 8, 2021	Oct 8, 2021	No	
Sky Force Anniversary	Shoot 'em up	Infinite Dreams; Crunching Koalas	Infinite Dreams	Sep 6, 2016	Sep 7, 2016	Unreleased	Yes	
Skylight Freerange	Adventure	Dragoon Entertainment	Dragoon Entertainment	Jun 6, 2017	Unreleased	Unreleased	No	
Skylight Freerange 2: Gachduine	Adventure	Dragoon Entertainment	Dragoon Entertainment	Sep 20, 2016	Unreleased	Unreleased	No	
Slain: Back from Hell	Hack and slash	Wolf Brew Games; 22nd Century Toys	JP: CrossFunction; WW: Digerati	Nov 22, 2016	Nov 22, 2016	May 26, 2017	No	
Slayaway Camp: Butcher's Cut	Puzzle	Blue Wizard Digital	Digerati Distribution	Nov 20, 2018	Nov 20, 2018	Unreleased	No	
Slotter Mania V: Black Lagoon	Pachinko	Dorasu	Dorasu	Unreleased	Unreleased	Mar 15, 2013	No	
Slotter Mania V: Highschool of the Dead	Pachinko	Dorasu	Dorasu	Unreleased	Unreleased	Oct 10, 2013	Yes	
Slotter Mania V: Zettai Shougeki II	Pachinko	Dorasu	Dorasu	Unreleased	Unreleased	Apr 18, 2013	Yes	
Sly 2: Band of Thieves	Platform	Sanzaru Games	Sony Computer Entertainment	Apr 16, 2014	Apr 16, 2014	Unreleased	Yes	
Sly 3: Honor Among Thieves	Platform	Sanzaru Games	Sony Computer Entertainment	Apr 16, 2014	Apr 16, 2014	Unreleased	Yes	
Sly Cooper and the Thievius Raccoonus	Platform	Sanzaru Games	Sony Computer Entertainment	Apr 16, 2014	Apr 16, 2014	Unreleased	Yes	
Sly Cooper: Thieves in Time	Platform	Sanzaru Games	Sony Computer Entertainment	Feb 5, 2013	Mar 27, 2013	Unreleased	Yes	
Smart As...	Puzzle, brain training	Climax Studios, XDev	Sony Computer Entertainment	Oct 30, 2012	Oct 31, 2012	Feb 28, 2013	No	
Soi Kano: Gyutto Dakishimete	Visual novel	Giga	Giga	Unreleased	Unreleased	Feb 21, 2019	No	
Sokoban Next	Puzzle	PalmStorm Kft.	PalmStorm Kft.	Nov 1, 2017	Jul 20, 2017	Unreleased	No	
Söldner-X 2: Final Prototype	Shoot 'em up	SideQuest Studios	eastasiasoft	Mar 17, 2015	Mar 18, 2015	Apr 16, 2015	Yes	
Sonic & All-Stars Racing Transformed	Racing	Sumo Digital	Sega	Dec 18, 2012	Dec 5, 2012	Unreleased	Yes	
Son of Scoregasm	Shooter	Charlie's Games	Charlie's Games	Oct 11, 2017	Oct 10, 2017	Unreleased	Yes	
Sorayume	Otome game	Takuyo	Takuyo	Unreleased	Unreleased	Jul 17, 2014	Yes	
Sorcery Saga: Curse of the Great Curry God	Roguelike	Compile Heart, ZeroDiv	Compile Heart (JP); Aksys Games (NA); Rising Star Games (EU)	Dec 10, 2013	Feb 21, 2014	Mar 28, 2013	Yes	
Sōsei no Onmyōji	Adventure	Bandai Namco Entertainment	Bandai Namco Entertainment	Unreleased	Unreleased	Jan 26, 2017	No	
Sōshū Senshinkan Gakuen: Hachimyoujin: Ten no Koku	Visual novel	Light	Light	Unreleased	Unreleased	Jul 24, 2014	Yes	
Sōkai Buccaneers!	Otome game	Petit Reve	Future Tech Lab	Unreleased	Unreleased	Jul 17, 2014	Yes	
Soul Sacrifice	Action role-playing	Japan Studio, Marvelous AQL, Comcept	Sony Computer Entertainment	Apr 30, 2013	May 1, 2013	Mar 7, 2013	Japan only	
Soul Sacrifice Delta (Note: Update for Soul Sacrifice.)	Action role-playing	Japan Studio, Marvelous AQL, Comcept	Sony Computer Entertainment	May 13, 2014	May 14, 2014	Mar 6, 2014	Yes	
Sound Shapes	Platform	Queasy Games, Santa Monica Studio	Sony Computer Entertainment	Aug 7, 2012	Aug 15, 2012	Sep 27, 2012	Yes	
Space Hulk	Turn-based strategy	Full Control	HR Games (NA); Funbox Media (EU); Digital Touch (JP)	Sep 1, 2015	Oct 20, 2015	Unreleased	No	
Spacejacked	Tower defense	Rotten Mage	Rotten Mage	Jul 16, 2018	Jul 16, 2018	Unreleased	Yes	
Space Overlords	Shooter	12 Hit Combo	Excalibur	Dec 6, 2016	Oct 25, 2016	Unreleased	No	
Sparkle	Puzzle	10tons	10tons	Dec 17, 2013	Sep 11, 2013	Unreleased	Yes	
Sparkle 2	Puzzle	10tons	10tons	May 20, 2014	May 21, 2014	Unreleased	Yes	
Sparkle Unleashed	Puzzle	10tons	10tons	Jun 2, 2015	Jun 3, 2015	Unreleased	Yes	
Spellspire	Word game	10tons	10tons	May 23, 2017	May 24, 2017	Unreleased	Yes	
Spheroids	Platform	Eclipse Games	Eclipse Games	Jan 10, 2017	Jan 10, 2017	Unreleased	Yes	
Spelunker Collection	Platform	Tozai Games	Tozai Games	Unreleased	Unreleased	Apr 25, 2013	Yes	
Spelunky	Roguelike	Mossmouth; BlitWorks	Mossmouth	Aug 27, 2013	Aug 28, 2013	Oct 23, 2014	Yes (1-4 players)	
Spider: Rite of the Shrouded Moon	Puzzle	Tiger Style; Abstraction Games	Tiger Style	Aug 6, 2015	Aug 6, 2015	Aug 6, 2015	Yes	
Spiral Splatter	Puzzle	Neonchimp Games; Sometimes You	Sometimes You	Oct 20, 2017	Oct 20, 2017	Unreleased	Yes	
Spirit Hunter: NG	Visual novel, adventure	Experience	JP: Experience; WW: Aksys Games	Oct 10, 2019	Oct 10, 2019	Sep 13, 2018	Yes	
SpongeBob HeroPants	Action-adventure	Behaviour Interactive	Activision	Feb 3, 2015	Feb 18, 2015	Unreleased	Yes	
Spy Chameleon: RGB Agent	Puzzle	Unfinished Pixel	Unfinished Pixel	Jul 21, 2016	Jul 21, 2016	Unreleased	Yes	
Spy Hunter	Vehicular combat	TT Fusion	Warner Bros. Interactive Entertainment	Oct 9, 2012	Oct 11, 2012	Dec 13, 2012	No	
Squareboy vs Bullies: Arena Edition	Beat 'em up	Rohan Narang; Ratalaika Games	Ratalaika Games	Oct 10, 2017	Oct 11, 2017	Unreleased	Yes	
Squares	Puzzle	Leap Game Studios	JP: CrossFunction; WW: Leap Game Studios	Jul 21, 2015	Aug 11, 2015	Nov 27, 2015	No	
Stardew Valley	Simulation	ConcernedApe	Chucklefish	May 22, 2018	May 22, 2018	Unreleased	Yes	
StarDrone Extreme	Action	Beatshapers	Beatshapers	Apr 17, 2012	Apr 12, 2012	Unreleased	No	
Starlight Inception	Space simulation	Escape Hatch Entertainment	Escape Hatch Entertainment	Apr 22, 2014	Apr 23, 2014	Unreleased	Yes	
Star Ocean: Second Evolution	Action role-playing	tri-Ace; Tose; Gemdrops	Square Enix	Unreleased	Unreleased	Oct 28, 2015	No	
Starry Sky: Autumn Stories	Otome game	Honeybee	Honeybee	Unreleased	Unreleased	Aug 24, 2017	Yes	
Starry Sky: Spring Stories	Otome game	Honeybee	Honeybee	Unreleased	Unreleased	Nov 23, 2016	Yes	
Starry Sky: Summer Stories	Otome game	Honeybee	Honeybee	Unreleased	Unreleased	May 11, 2017	Yes	
Starry Sky: Winter Stories	Otome game	Honeybee	Honeybee	Unreleased	Unreleased	Nov 30, 2017	Yes	
Star Wars Pinball (Note: Stand-alone expansion for Zen Pinball 2. A stand-alone release of the Star Wars Pinball table pack, with additional community features.)	Pinball	Zen Studios	Zen Studios	May 14, 2013	May 15, 2013	Unreleased	Yes	
Star Wars Pinball: The Force Awakens (Note: DLC for Star Wars Pinball; also available for Zen Pinball 2.)	Pinball	Zen Studios	Zen Studios	Jan 12, 2016	Unreleased	Unreleased	Yes	
Stay	Adventure	Appnormals Team; Ratalaika Games	Ratalaika Games	Sep 12, 2018	Sep 12, 2018	Oct 26, 2018	Yes	
Stealth Inc: A Clone in the Dark	Puzzle-platform	Curve Studios	Sony Computer Entertainment	Jul 23, 2013	Jul 24, 2013	Aug 26, 2014	Yes	
Stealth Inc 2: A Game of Clones	Puzzle-platform	Curve Studios	Curve Digital	Apr 7, 2015	Apr 8, 2015	Unreleased	Yes	
Steam Prison: Nanatsu no Bitoku	Otome game	HuneX	HuneX	Unreleased	Unreleased	Oct 26, 2017	Yes	
Steam Tactics	Turn-based strategy	Sometimes You	Sometimes You	Aug 5, 2020	Aug 5, 2020	Unreleased	No	
SteamWorld Dig	Platform	Image & Form	JP: Interglow; WW: Image & Form	Mar 18, 2014	Mar 19, 2014	Dec 3, 2014	Yes	
SteamWorld Dig 2	Platform	Image & Form	Image & Form	Sep 26, 2017	Sep 26, 2017	Unreleased	Yes	
SteamWorld Heist	Turn-based strategy, action-adventure	Image & Form	Image & Form	Jun 7, 2016	Jun 7, 2016	Unreleased	Physical only	
Steins;Gate	Visual novel	5pb.; Nitroplus	JP: 5pb.; WW: PQube	Aug 25, 2015	Jun 5, 2015	Mar 14, 2013	Yes	
Steins;Gate 0	Visual novel	5pb.; Nitroplus	JP: 5pb.; WW: PQube	Sep 27, 2016	Sep 23, 2016	Dec 10, 2015	Yes	
Steins;Gate Elite (Note: Update for Steins;Gate. A fully animated remake of the original visual novel.)	Visual novel	5pb.	5pb.	Unreleased	Unreleased	Sep 20, 2018	Yes	
Steins;Gate: Hiyoku Renri no Darling	Visual novel	5pb.	5pb.	Unreleased	Unreleased	Mar 14, 2013	Yes	
Steins;Gate: Senkei Kōsoku no Phenogram	Visual novel	5pb.	5pb.	Unreleased	Unreleased	Nov 28, 2013	Yes	
Stick It to the Man!	Adventure	Zoink	Ripstone	Dec 3, 2013	Dec 4, 2013	Unreleased	Yes	
Still Time	Puzzle	Alan Zucconi	Alan Zucconi	Aug 29, 2017	Aug 29, 2017	Unreleased	No	
Storm Lover	Dating sim	Vridge	D3 Publisher	Unreleased	Unreleased	Dec 23, 2015	Yes	
Storm Lover 2nd V	Dating sim	Vridge	D3 Publisher	Unreleased	Unreleased	Jan 28, 2016	Yes	
Stranded: A Mars Adventure	Platform	Tama Global	Tama Global	Nov 22, 2016	Nov 15, 2016	Jul 20, 2017	Yes	
Stranger of Sword City	Dungeon crawler	Experience	JP: Experience; WW: NIS America	Apr 26, 2016	Apr 29, 2016	Jan 22, 2015	Yes	
Stranger of Sword City Revisited (Note: Update for Stranger of Sword City.)	Dungeon crawler	Experience	Experience	Feb 28, 2017	Unreleased	Jul 21, 2016	Yes	
Strawberry Nauts	Visual novel	Hooksoft	Entergram	Unreleased	Unreleased	Jul 28, 2016	Yes	
Street Fighter X Tekken	Fighting	Capcom	Capcom	Oct 23, 2012	Oct 19, 2012	Oct 25, 2012	No	
Strike Solitaire	Puzzle	Creobit	4Hit	May 1, 2015	Mar 18, 2015	Unreleased	No	
Strike Solitaire 2	Puzzle	Creobit	4Hit	Jul 15, 2015	May 28, 2015	Unreleased	Yes	
SturmFront: The Mutant War - Farewell Edition	Shooter	Red Art Games	Red Art Games	Jun 22, 2021	Jun 22, 2021	Unreleased	No	
Sūgaku-ryoku-ō Jōkyū	Educational	Media5	Media5	Unreleased	Unreleased	May 30, 2013	Yes	
Sūgaku-ryoku-ō Shokyū	Educational	Media5	Media5	Unreleased	Unreleased	May 30, 2013	Yes	
Sūgaku-ryoku-ō Chūkyū	Educational	Media5	Media5	Unreleased	Unreleased	May 30, 2013	Yes	
Suki to Suki to de Sankaku Ren'ai	Visual novel	ASa Project	ASa Project	Unreleased	Unreleased	Jan 24, 2019	No	
Sumioni: Demon Arts	Action-platform	Acquire	JP: Acquire; WW: Xseed Games	Mar 20, 2012	Jan 16, 2013	Feb 9, 2012	No	
Summon Night 6	Tactical role-playing	Media.Vision; Felistella	JP: Bandai Namco Entertainment; WW: Gaijinworks	Oct 31, 2017	Nov 15, 2017	Mar 10, 2016	Yes	
The Sun & Moon	Platform	Daniel Linssen	Digerati	Apr 26, 2016	Unreleased	Unreleased	No	
Sunflowers	Puzzle	The Game Atelier	The Game Atelier	Oct 9, 2012	Sep 12, 2012	Unreleased	No	
Superbeat: Xonic	Rhythm	Nurijoy	Acttil, Atlus, PM Studios (NA); Rising Star Games (EU); Arc System Works (JP)	Nov 10, 2015	Nov 10, 2015	Dec 17, 2015	Yes	
Super Blackout	Puzzle	Fordesoft	Fordesoft	Oct 13, 2015	Unreleased	Unreleased	Yes	
Super Blast Deluxe	Puzzle-platform	Raptus Games	Raptus Games	Feb 16, 2016	Jun 21, 2016	Unreleased	Yes	
Super Box Land Demake	Puzzle	Ratalaika Games	EastAsiaSoft	Oct 8, 2019	Oct 8, 2019	Unreleased	No	
Super Destronaut DX	Shooter	Petite Games	Ratalaika Games	Jul 17, 2018	Jul 11, 2018	Unreleased	No	
Super Destronaut: Land Wars	Shooter	Petite Games	Ratalaika Games	Oct 10, 2020	Unreleased	Unreleased	No	
Superdimension Neptune VS Sega Hard Girls	Role-playing	Felistella	Compile Heart	Oct 18, 2016	Oct 21, 2016	Nov 26, 2015	Yes	
Super Exploding Zoo	Puzzle	Honeyslug	Honeyslug	Jun 2, 2015	Jun 3, 2015	Aug 5, 2015	Yes	
Superfrog HD	Platform	Team17	Sony Computer Entertainment	Aug 6, 2013	Jul 31, 2013	Unreleased	Yes	
Super Hero Generation	Tactical role-playing	Tom Create	Bandai Namco Games	Unreleased	Unreleased	Oct 23, 2014	Yes	
Super Heroine Chronicle	Tactical role-playing	Banpresto	Bandai Namco Games	Unreleased	Unreleased	Feb 6, 2014	No	
Super Hydorah	Shoot 'em up	Locomalito	Abylight Studios	Dec 13, 2017	Dec 14, 2017	Unreleased	Yes	
Super Life of Pixel	Platform	Super Icon	WhiteMoon Dreams	Dec 4, 2018	Unreleased	Unreleased	No	
Supermagical	Puzzle	Tama Games	Tama Games	Jan 17, 2017	Jan 17, 2017	Jul 6, 2017	Yes	
Super Meat Boy	Platform	Team Meat, BlitWorks	Team Meat	Oct 6, 2015	Oct 6, 2015	Oct 6, 2015	Yes	
Super Monkey Ball: Banana Splitz	Puzzle	Marvelous AQL	Sega	Oct 23, 2012	Oct 26, 2012	Jun 14, 2012	No	
Super Mutant Alien Assault	Shooter	Cybernate	Fellow Traveller	Sep 11, 2018	Sep 11, 2018	Unreleased	Yes	
Super Robot Wars	Tactical role-playing	Banpresto	Bandai Namco Games	Unreleased	Unreleased	Oct 10, 2014	Yes	
Super Robot Wars Taisen Original Generation Saga: Masō Kishin 3 – Pride of Justice	Tactical role-playing	Banpresto	Bandai Namco Games	Unreleased	Unreleased	Aug 22, 2013	Yes	
Super Robot Wars V	Tactical role-playing	Banpresto	Bandai Namco Games	Unreleased	Unreleased	Feb 23, 2017	Yes	
Super Robot Wars X	Tactical role-playing	Banpresto	Bandai Namco Games	Unreleased	Unreleased	Mar 29, 2018	Yes	
Super Skull Smash Go! 2 Turbo	Platform	Thomas Hopper, Tacs Games	Poppy Works	Jul 17, 2018	Jul 17, 2018	Jul 19, 2018	Yes	
Super Stardust Delta	Shoot 'em up	Housemarque	Sony Computer Entertainment	Feb 22, 2012	Feb 22, 2012	Jan 19, 2012	No	
Super Star Wars	Run and gun	Sculptured Software, LucasArts, Code Mystics	Disney Interactive Studios	Nov 17, 2015	Nov 24, 2015	Unreleased	Yes	
Super Time Force Ultra	Action	Capybara Games	Capybara Games	Sep 1, 2015	Sep 1, 2015	May 11, 2016	Yes	
Super Weekend Mode	Shooter	Pixelteriyaki	Ratalaika Games	Apr 9, 2019	Apr 9, 2019	Unreleased	No	
Super Wiloo Demake	Action	lightUp	Ratalaika Games	Jul 30, 2019	Jul 30, 2019	Unreleased	No	
Supremacy MMA: Unrestricted	Fighting	Kung Fu Factory	505 Games	Mar 27, 2012	Apr 25, 2012	Unreleased	No	
Sūran Digit	Otome game	Otomate	Idea Factory	Unreleased	Unreleased	Oct 20, 2016	Yes	
Surge Deluxe	Puzzle	FuturLab	FuturLab	Feb 4, 2014	Feb 5, 2014	Unreleased	No	
The Swapper	Puzzle-platform	Facepalm Games, Curve Studios	Facepalm Games	Aug 5, 2014	Aug 6, 2014	Nov 4, 2015	Yes	
SwapQuest	Puzzle	Rebusmind	Rebusmind	Feb 23, 2016	Feb 23, 2016	Unreleased	No	
Sweet Clown: Gozen San-ji no Okashi na Dōkeshi	Otome game	Takuyo	Takuyo	Unreleased	Unreleased	Jul 16, 2015	Yes	
Sweet Pool	Visual novel	Nitro+chiral	Dramatic Create	Unreleased	Unreleased	May 31, 2018	Yes	
The Swindle	Puzzle-platform	Size Five Games, Curve Studios	Curve Digital	Jul 28, 2015	Jul 29, 2015	Unreleased	Yes	
Switch Galaxy Ultra	Racing	Atomicom	Atomicom	Dec 23, 2014	Dec 17, 2014	Unreleased	No	
Sword Art Online: Hollow Fragment	Action role-playing	Aquria	Bandai Namco Games	Aug 19, 2014	Aug 20, 2014	Apr 24, 2014	Yes	
Sword Art Online: Hollow Realization	Action role-playing	Aquria	Bandai Namco Entertainment	Nov 8, 2016	Nov 8, 2016	Oct 27, 2016	Yes	
Sword Art Online: Lost Song	Action role-playing	Artdink	Bandai Namco Entertainment	Nov 17, 2015	Nov 13, 2015	Mar 26, 2015	Yes	
Swordbreaker The Game	Visual novel	Sometimes You	Sometimes You	Sep 30, 2020	Sep 30, 2020	Unreleased	No	
Synergia	Visual novel	Top Hat Studios	Top Hat Studios	Mar 18, 2021	Unreleased	Unreleased	Yes	
Syrup and the Ultimate Sweet	Visual novel	NomnomNami	Ratalaika Games	Mar 4, 2020	Mar 4, 2020	Unreleased	No	

== See also ==
- List of PlayStation Vita games (A–D)
- List of PlayStation Vita games (E–H)
- List of PlayStation Vita games (I–L)
- List of PlayStation Vita games (M–O)
- List of PlayStation Vita games (P–R)
- List of PlayStation Vita games (T–V)
- List of PlayStation Vita games (W–Z)
