= Prototype (company) =

Japanese software company

Prototype Co., Ltd.
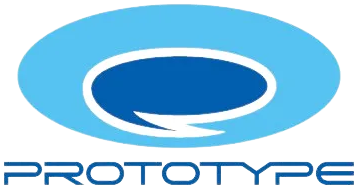
- Native name: 株式会社プロトタイプ
- Romanized name: Kabushiki kaisha Purototaipu
- Type: Kabushiki kaisha
- Industry: Video games
- Founded: March 27, 2006
- Founder: Toshio Tabeta
- Headquarters: Higashinihonbashi, Chūō, Tokyo, Japan
- Products: Visual novels
- Website: prot.co.jp

Prototype Co., Ltd. (株式会社プロトタイプ, Kabushiki kaisha Purototaipu) is a Japanese video game publisher established on March 27, 2006 by Toshio Tabeta, a former producer of Interchannel. While still with Interchannel, Tabeta's team was responsible for mainly developing and publishing versions of visual novels originally published by VisualArt's for consumer platforms like the PlayStation 2 and PlayStation Portable. After Prototype split off from Interchannel, the company still continued to work with VisualArt's. Prototype is also involved in producing mobile phone ports through VisualArt's Motto which Prototype manages. Prototype has also produced a set of drama CDs based on Key's visual novel Clannad.

== Games published ==
=== Console games ===
Title	Developer(s)	Platform(s)	Original release	Region(s) released
Hanakisō	HaccaWorks*	PlayStation 2	July 6, 2006	JP
Planetarian: The Reverie of a Little Planet	Key	PlayStation 2	August 24, 2006	JP
Tomoyo After: It's a Wonderful Life CS Edition	Key	PlayStation 2	January 25, 2007	JP
Shinkyoku Sōkai Polyphonica	Ocelot	PlayStation 2	April 26, 2007	JP
Arabians Lost: The Engagement on Desert	Quin Rose	PlayStation 2	October 11, 2007	JP
Shinkyoku Sōkai Polyphonica: 3 & 4-wa Kanketsuhen	Ocelot	PlayStation 2	December 27, 2007	JP
Clannad	Key	Xbox 360	August 28, 2008	JP
Piyotan: Oyashiki Sennyū Taisakusen	Prototype	PlayStation 2	August 28, 2008	JP
Heart no Kuni no Alice	Quin Rose	PlayStation 2	September 18, 2008	JP
Shinkyoku Sōkai Polyphonica: The Black	Ocelot	PlayStation 2	January 15, 2009	JP
Time Leap	Frontwing	Xbox 360	June 25, 2009	JP
Little Busters! Converted Edition	Key	PlayStation 2	December 24, 2009	JP
Clover no Kuni no Alice	Quin Rose	PlayStation 2	April 15, 2010	JP
Tomoyo After: It's a Wonderful Life CS Edition	Key	Xbox 360	September 22, 2010	JP
Shinkyoku Sōkai Polyphonica: After School	Ocelot	PlayStation 2	November 11, 2010	JP
Clannad	Key	PlayStation 3	April 21, 2011	JP
Sangoku Koi Senki: Otome no Heihō!	Daisy2	PlayStation 2	June 15, 2011	JP
Time Leap	Frontwing	PlayStation 3	January 12, 2012	JP
Tomoyo After: It's a Wonderful Life CS Edition	Key	PlayStation 3	July 29, 2012	JP
Little Busters! Converted Edition	Key	PlayStation 3	March 20, 2013	JP
Rewrite	Key	PlayStation 3	February 11, 2015	JP
Rewrite	Key	PlayStation 4	March 23, 2017	JP
Hoshi Ori Yume Mirai	tone work's	PlayStation 4	September 14, 2017	JP
Clannad	Key	PlayStation 4	June 14, 2018	Worldwide
Island	Frontwing	PlayStation 4	June 28, 2018	JP
Sangoku Koi Senki: Otome no Heihō!	Daisy2	Nintendo Switch	November 22, 2018	JP
Yoshiwara Higanbana Kuon no Chigiri	MariaCrown	Nintendo Switch	December 20, 2018	JP
Zettai Kaikyuu Gakuen ~Eden with roses and phantasm~	Daisy2	PlayStation 4	January 10, 2019	JP
Planetarian: The Reverie of a Little Planet	Key	Nintendo Switch	January 31, 2019	Worldwide
Flowers - Shiki	Innocent Grey	PlayStation 4	March 7, 2019	JP
Taishou x Alice all in one	Primula	Nintendo Switch	April 18, 2019	JP
Summer Pockets	Key	Nintendo Switch	June 20, 2019	JP
Clannad	Key	Nintendo Switch	July 4, 2019	Worldwide
Fatal Twelve	aiueo Kompany	PlayStation 4	August 8, 2019	Worldwide
Omega Vampire	Karin Chatnoir Ω	Nintendo Switch	August 29, 2019	JP
The Grisaia Trilogy	Frontwing	Nintendo Switch	November 7, 2019	Worldwide
Flowers - Shiki	Innocent Grey	Nintendo Switch	November 28, 2019	JP
Zettai Kaikyuu Gakuen ~Eden with roses and phantasm~	Daisy2	Nintendo Switch	December 19, 2019	JP
Chou no Doku Hana no Kusari	Aromarie	Nintendo Switch	February 20, 2020	JP
Little Busters! Converted Edition	Key	Nintendo Switch	April 23, 2020	Worldwide
Gunka o Haita Neko	Primula	Nintendo Switch	June 18, 2020	JP
Grisaia Phantom Trigger 01 & 02	Frontwing	Nintendo Switch	June 25, 2020	Worldwide
Island	Frontwing	Nintendo Switch	April 8, 2021	JP

=== Portable games ===
Title	Developer(s)	Platform(s)	Original release	Region(s) released
Kanon	Key	PlayStation Portable	February 15, 2007	JP
Snow: Portable	Studio Mebius	PlayStation Portable	August 16, 2007	JP
Air	Key	PlayStation Portable	November 22, 2007	JP
Clannad	Key	PlayStation Portable	May 29, 2008	JP
Shinkyoku Sōkai Polyphonica: 0–4-wa Full Pack	Ocelot	PlayStation Portable	June 26, 2008	JP
Tomoyo After: It's a Wonderful Life CS Edition	Key	PlayStation Portable	March 19, 2009	JP
Heart no Kuni no Alice	Quin Rose	PlayStation Portable	August 20, 2009	JP
Planetarian: The Reverie of a Little Planet	Key	PlayStation Portable	August 24, 2009	JP
Arabians Lost: The Engagement on Desert	Quin Rose	Nintendo DS	September 10, 2009	JP
Gakuen Heaven: Boy's Love Scramble!	Spray	PlayStation Portable	November 26, 2009	JP
Clannad: Hikari Mimamoru Sakamichi de	Key, Prototype	PlayStation Portable	June 3, 2010 (volume 1); July 15, 2010 (volume 2)	JP
Hanakisō	HaccaWorks*	PlayStation Portable	September 22, 2010	JP
Little Busters! Converted Edition	Key	PlayStation Portable	November 25, 2010	JP
Gakuen Heaven: Okawari!	Spray	PlayStation Portable	February 10, 2011	JP
Amatsumi Sora ni! Kumo no Hatate ni	Clochette	PlayStation Portable	February 16, 2012	JP
Little Busters! Converted Edition	Key	PlayStation Vita	March 22, 2012	JP
Sangoku Koi Senki: Otome no Heihō!	Daisy2	PlayStation Portable	July 26, 2012	JP
Grisaia no Kajitsu: Le Fruit de la Grisaia	Front Wing	PlayStation Portable	February 21, 2013	JP
Sangoku Koi Senki: Otome no Heihō!	Daisy2	PlayStation Vita	April 25, 2013	JP
Kud Wafter Converted Edition	Key	PlayStation Portable	May 9, 2013	JP
Grisaia no Kajitsu: Le Fruit de la Grisaia	Front Wing	PlayStation Vita	August 8, 2013	JP
Kud Wafter Converted Edition	Key	PlayStation Vita	December 19, 2013	JP
Chō no Doku Hana no Kusari: Taishō Enren Ibun	Aromarie	PlayStation Portable	January 16, 2014	JP
Chō no Doku Hana no Kusari: Taishō Enren Ibun	Aromarie	PlayStation Vita	February 20, 2014	JP
Rewrite	Key	PlayStation Portable	April 17, 2014	JP
Clannad	Key	PlayStation Vita	August 14, 2014	JP
Rewrite	Key	PlayStation Vita	August 28, 2014	JP
Flowers	Innocent Grey	PlayStation Vita	October 19, 2014	JP
Walpurgis no Uta ~Walpurgisgedichte~	Daisy3	PlayStation Vita and PlayStation Portable	December 23, 2015	JP
Island	Front Wing	PlayStation Vita	February 23, 2017	JP
Rewrite Harvest Festa!	Key	PlayStation Vita	May 18, 2017	JP
Grisaia no Kajitsu -Side Episode-	Front Wing	PlayStation Vita	July 27, 2017	JP
Amatsutsumi	Purple Software	PlayStation Vita	May 7, 2018	JP
Seven Days: Anata to Sugosu Nanokakan	LIFE0	PlayStation Vita	July 25, 2018	JP
Gunka o Haita Neko	Primula	PlayStation Vita	September 12, 2019	JP

==== Mobile phone games ====
Title	Developer(s)	Platform(s)	Original release	Region(s) released
Planetarian: The Reverie of a Little Planet	Key	FOMA, SoftBank 3G	November 2006	JP
Air	Key	FOMA, SoftBank 3G	May 2007	JP
Kanon	Key	FOMA, SoftBank 3G	May 2007	JP
Clannad	Key	FOMA, SoftBank 3G	January 2008	JP
Tomoyo After: It's a Wonderful Life	Key	FOMA, SoftBank 3G	May 2008	JP
Gakuen Heaven	Spray	FOMA, SoftBank 3G		JP
Kare to Kare to Kare no Hazama de	Amedeo	FOMA, SoftBank 3G		JP
Realize	PlayM	FOMA, SoftBank 3G		JP
Seraphim Spiral	B Works	FOMA, SoftBank 3G		JP
Shinkyoku Sōkai Polyphonica	Ocelot	FOMA, SoftBank 3G		JP
Soshite Bokura wa,	Spray	FOMA, SoftBank 3G		JP
Snow	Studio Mebius	FOMA, SoftBank 3G		JP
