= Island (video game) =

Japanese visual novel

- Island original visual novel cover featuring heroines (from left to right): Rinne Ohara, Karen Kurutsu and Sara Garando.
- Genre: Romance, science fiction
- Video game
- Developer: Frontwing
- Publisher: Frontwing (PC), Prototype (PS4/PSVita, Switch)
- Produced by: Ryuichiro Yamakawa
- Designed by: Yōsai Kūchū
- Genre: Visual novel
- Platform: Windows, PlayStation Vita, PlayStation 4, Nintendo Switch
- Released: JP: 28 April 2016; WW: 24 August 2018
- Anime television series
- Directed by: Keiichiro Kawaguchi
- Produced by: Hirohiko Kanbe; Nobuhiko Kurosu; Hiroshi Gotō; Satoru Shimosato; Isami Nakagawa; Kenji Ebato; Yōichirō Uesaka; Kiyotaka Kobayashi
- Written by: Naruhisa Arakawa
- Music by: Akiyuki Tateyama
- Studio: Feel
- Licensed by: Crunchyroll; SEA: Medialink
- Original network: Tokyo MX, SUN, AT-X, BS Fuji
- Original run: 1 July 2018 – 16 September 2018
- Episodes: 12

Island (stylized as ISLAND) is a Japanese mystery romance visual novel developed by Frontwing. It was released on 28 April 2016 for Windows. It was later ported to the PlayStation Vita, PlayStation 4 and Nintendo Switch published by Prototype. An English version of the visual novel was released on Steam in August 2018. A 12-episode anime television series adaptation by Feel aired between July and September 2018. Unlike most of Frontwing's releases, Island is not a part of their eroge catalogue.

== Gameplay ==
Average dialogue in Island depicting the main character Setsuna talking to Sara, Rinne, and Karen (respectively).

Island is a romance visual novel in which the player assumes the role of Setsuna Sanzenkai. Like most visual novels, the entirety of the interactivity is spent on reading the story's narrative and dialogue, with text accompanied by character sprites of who Setsuna is talking to or surrounded by accompanied by background art marking the location of the scene. Throughout the adventure, original illustrations (also known as CGs) will sometimes take visual focus over key scenes in the story, instead of standard background art and character sprites. The adventure follows a branching plot line with multiple endings, and depending on the decisions that the player makes during the game, the plot will progress in a specific direction or end prematurely.

The game is set on the fictional island of Urashima in Japan, inspired from the Japanese story Urashima Tarō. The island was controlled by 3 families, and is plagued with a fictional disease named Soot Blight Syndrome. By the time of the game's setting, the three families have decreased in influence and power. The main character, washed up on the shore and claiming that he has traveled back in time, works with three girls from the influential families in order to challenge island traditions. The game uses a flowchart system to visualize the paths.

There are three main plot lines that the player will have the chance to experience, one for each heroine (and an additional one for the Re: ending). There are five parts of the story - Karen, Sara, Rinne (each one named after the main girls), as well as Midsummer and Winter. Throughout gameplay, the player is given multiple options to choose from, and text progression pauses at these points until a choice is made. Some decisions can lead the game to end prematurely, which offer an alternative ending to the plot. To view all plot lines in their entirety, the player will have to replay the game multiple times and choose different choices to further the plot to an alternate direction.

== Characters ==
=== Main characters ===
Setsuna Sanzenkai (三千界 切那, Sanzenkai Setsuna)
Voiced by: Tatsuhisa Suzuki (anime) (Japanese); Austin Tindle (English)
A man who lost his memories and washed up on the island's beach. He becomes a servant for the Ohara family, but because of Rinne's death, he uses a "cold sleep" machine developed by Karen's mother to go to the future.

Rinne Ohara (御原 凛音, Ohara Rinne)
Voiced by: Yukari Tamura (Japanese); Jad Saxton (English)
The series' main heroine, she is a member of the Ohara family which is influential in the island. Because of an experience she had several years ago, she usually stays at her family's manor and rarely went out until she met Setsuna.

Karen Kurutsu (枢都 夏蓮, Kurutsu Karen)
Voiced by: Kana Asumi (Japanese); Alexis Tipton (English)
The daughter of the island's mayor. She was previously abandoned by her mother, who had become a scientist in the mainland and later died under mysterious circumstances. Because of this, she becomes enamored with the mainland, particularly after she visited it with her mother during her childhood.

Sara Garando (伽藍堂 紗羅, Garandō Sara)
Voiced by: Rie Murakawa (game), Hibiku Yamamura (anime) (Japanese); Dani Chambers (English)
The island's miko. She initially believed that her parents died in a fire five years prior to the start of the story, although it is revealed that her mother is still alive and working as a nurse in a clinic. She also believed that her parents came from the future due to a mark on her body, although it is revealed that the mark was branded on her when she was young, as part of her family's traditions.

=== Other characters ===
Kuon Ohara (御原 玖音, Ohara Kuon)
Voiced by: Rina Satō (Japanese); Morgan Garrett (English)

Taro Harisu (播守 太郎, Harisu Tarō)
Voiced by: Takamasa Mogi (Japanese); Shawn Gann (English)

Moritsugu Kurutsu (枢都 守継, Kurutsu Moritsugu)
Voiced by: Mitsuru Ogata (Japanese); Barry Yandell (English)

Subaru Kurutsu (枢都 守春, Kurutsu Subaru)
Voiced by: Kengo Kawanishi (Japanese); Brandon McInnis (English)

Kenji Morisu (森須 賢治, Morisu Kenji)
Voiced by: Shinya Fukumatsu (Japanese); Phil Parsons (English)

Momoka Yamabuki (山吹 桃香, Yamabuki Momoka)
Voiced by: Ai Kakuma (Japanese); Kate Bristol (English)

Mei Tandori (反取 芽衣, Tandori Mei)
Voiced by: Yui Nakajima (anime) (Japanese); Katelyn Barr (English)

An Hatoma (鳩間 杏, Hatoma An)
Voiced by: Tomoyo Takayanagi (anime) (Japanese); Sarah Wiedenheft (English)

Emiri Sunada (砂田 笑里, Sunada Emiri)
Voiced by: Takako Tanaka (anime) (Japanese); Emily Fajardo (English)

== Development and release ==
Developed by the visual novel studio Frontwing, Island was produced by Ryuichiro Yamakawa, with G.O. writing the scenario. The art direction and character design were provided by Yōsai Kūchū. Background art is provided by Magnum and Cre-p. The game's music was composed by Hijiri Anze. Rated for all ages, the development staff classifies the game as a "momentary and eternal fairy tale" (せつなとえいえんのおとぎばなし, Setsuna to eien no otogibanashi). Frontwing released the game for Windows on 28 April 2016. Prototype released a version for the PlayStation Vita on 23 February 2017, and they released a PlayStation 4 port on 28 June 2018. An English version of the visual novel was released on Steam on 24 August 2018, with Frontwing stating they were considering releasing it on other platforms. A port for the Nintendo Switch was released on 8 April 2021 in Japan and contains an English language option for importers of the physical version.

Island has three pieces of theme music: one opening theme and two ending themes. The opening theme is "Traveler's Tale", sung by Riya of Eufonius, the first ending theme is "Present" (プレゼント, Purezento), sung by Chata, and the second ending theme is "Kimi ga Ita" (きみがいた) by Eufonius.

== Adaptations ==
=== Manga ===
NyaroMelon and Front Wing published a two-chapter four-panel comic strip manga crossover with NyaroMelon's Berlin wa Kane manga, titled Island x Berlin wa Kane (『ISLAND』×『ベルリンは鐘』, ISLAND × Berurin wa Kane), on Akita Shoten's Champion Tappu! website between 7 and 21 April 2016. A two-chapter manga adaptation by Naoya Yao was serialized in Simsum Media's Cosplay Channel magazine from 21 April to 11 July 2016.

=== Anime ===
A 12-episode anime television series adaptation, directed by Keiichiro Kawaguchi at Feel, aired from 1 July to 16 September 2018 on Tokyo MX and other channels. Crunchyroll streamed the series, and it was also streamed by Funimation with an English dub. Series composition is handled by Naruhisa Arakawa, music is handled by Akiyuki Tateyama, and characters are designed by Kousuke Kawamura. The first opening theme song is "Eien no Hitotsu" (永遠のひとつ) by Yukari Tamura, and the first ending theme song is "Eternal Star" by Asaka. The second opening theme song is "Closing Tears" by Tamura, and the second ending theme is "Marine Snow" by Asaka. There are four insert songs performed by the main characters: "Lasting Memories" by Rinne Ohara (Tamura), "Purest Summer" by Karen Kurutsu (Kana Asumi), "Tennen Kinen Girl Janai yo" (天然記念ガールじゃないよ) by Sara Garandou (Hibiku Yamamura) and "Quiet sea" by Rinne Ohara (Tamura) and Setsuna Sanzenkai (Tatsuhisa Suzuki).

Although Rie Murakawa had originally been announced to return to her role as Sara from the game, the character was recast following disputes over the script between Murakawa's agency Haikyo and the production committee and staff. Haikyo's requested changes would have required changes to already completed animated sequences and the script, and would, according to the production committee, have affected the nature of some characters, as well as the quality of the animation and the anime in general. Due to this, Haikyo sent the production a list of suggested actors who could replace Murakawa, and in the end, Hibiku Yamamura was chosen.

No.	Title (Note: All English titles are taken from Crunchyroll.)	Original air date
1	"We Meet Again"; Transliteration: "Mata Aeta ne Anata to" (Japanese: またあえたねあなたと)	1 July 2018
2	"I Don't Want You to Feel Bad"; Transliteration: "Kuyamanaide Hoshii Kara" (Japanese: くやまないでほしいから)	8 July 2018
3	"The Right Way to Spin Dreams"; Transliteration: "Tadashii Yume no Tsumugikata" (Japanese: ただしいゆめのつむぎかた)	15 July 2018
4	"This World is Full of Secrets"; Transliteration: "Kono Sekai wa Himitsu Darake" (Japanese: このせかいはひみつだらけ)	22 July 2018
5	"That's Why I Trust You"; Transliteration: "Dakara Anata o Shinjiteru" (Japanese: だからあなたをしんじてる)	29 July 2018
6	"As Long as You Are There"; Transliteration: "Soko ni Anata ga Ireba Ii" (Japanese: そこにあなたがいればいい)	5 August 2018
7	"I Want to Keep Liking You"; Transliteration: "Zutto Suki de Itai no ni" (Japanese: ずっとすきでいたいのに)	12 August 2018
8	"Love Me When We Meet Again"; Transliteration: "Mata Aetara Aishite ne" (Japanese: またあえたらあいしてね)	19 August 2018
9	"I Got to See You Again"; Transliteration: "Mata Aeta na Omae to" (Japanese: マタアエタナオマエト)	26 August 2018
10	"I Don't Want to Grieve Anymore"; Transliteration: "Monku Yamitakunai Kara" (Japanese: モンクヤミタクナイカラ)	2 September 2018
11	"We've Met Again, But You..."; Transliteration: "Mata Aeta Kedo Anata wa" (Japanese: またあえたけどアナタは)	9 September 2018
12	"Holding Hands to Tomorrow"; Transliteration: "Te o Tsunaide Ashita" (Japanese: てをつないでアシタヘ)	16 September 2018
