= Gakuen Heaven =

Japanese media franchise

- Volume 1 of the anime series

学園ヘヴン (Gakuen Hevun)
- Genre: Yaoi
- Video game

Gakuen Heaven: Boy's Love Scramble
- Developer: SPRAY
- Publisher: SPRAY (Windows); NEC Interchannel (PS2); Prototype (PSP)
- Platform: Windows, PlayStation 2, PlayStation Portable
- Released: August 2, 2002 (Windows); November 27, 2003 (PS2); November 26, 2009 (PSP)
- Novel
- Written by: TAMAMI
- Published by: Biblos
- Published: October 2002
- Manga
- Written by: You Higuri
- Published by: Biblos
- English publisher: NA: BLU
- Magazine: Magazine Be × Boy
- Published: March 10, 2004
- Volumes: 1
- Video game

Gakuen Heaven: Boy's Love Scramble - Type B
- Publisher: NEC Interchannel
- Genre: BL
- Platform: PlayStation 2
- Released: July 22, 2004
- Video game

Gakuen Heaven: Okawari
- Publisher: Interchannel (PS2); Prototype (PSP)
- Platform: PlayStation 2, PlayStation Portable
- Released: February 27, 2005 (PS2); February 10, 2011 (PSP)
- Anime television series

Gakuen Heaven: Boy's Love Hyper
- Directed by: Yukina Hiiro
- Written by: Natsuko Takahashi
- Studio: Tokyo Kids
- Licensed by: NA: AnimeWorks; SEA: Medialink
- Original network: AT-X
- English network: US: Toku
- Original run: April 1, 2006 – June 24, 2006
- Episodes: 13

Gakuen Heaven (Japanese: 学園ヘヴン, Hepburn: Gakuen Hevun; lit. "Academy Heaven") is a Japanese media franchise originating from the Windows game Gakuen Heaven: Boy's Love Scramble, originally released by the company SPRAY. The franchise gradually expanded to include more games, drama CDs, manga, and anime.

== Plot ==
Keita Itō, an average high school boy, is surprised to find out that he's been accepted into the elite and prestigious boarding school, Bell Liberty Academy ベル自由 学園 (Beru Jiyū Gakuen) Unnerved by the mystery, he's further distracted by the school's social dynamics. In a sea of amazing young men, Keita struggles to find out what makes him unique, and how he can possibly deserve to be treated as an equal by the students of Bell Liberty.

== Characters ==
Keita Itō (伊藤 啓太, Itō Keita)
Voiced by: Jun Fukuyama
During the middle of the school year, he received a letter of admission from Bell Liberty Academy. Though he seems to be an average guy without any sort of special skills, he is a very warm and friendly person. The only skill he thought he had was luck. He seems to have forgotten who Kazuki is really. While he was young, he contracted the same virus that Hiroya Yoshizumi was infected with.
Kazuki Endō (遠藤 和希, Endō Kazuki)
Voiced by: Takahiro Sakurai
He is Keita's classmate and the first friend Keita makes at BL Academy. He leads a double life as a student of BL Academy and as its chairman. The last wishes of the school's late chairman, Endō's grandfather, were for Endō to succeed in his position. Endō's innocuous and perpetually friendly demeanor does not betray the fact that he is also an excellent executive. Endō is also a part of the school's handicrafts club. He is actually Keita's childhood friend who promised in the future that they could go to the same school.
Kaoru Saionji (西園寺 郁, Saionji Kaoru)
Voiced by: Hiroshi Kamiya
He is the head of the school's Treasury/Accounting department. Strikingly beautiful, he shares the same amount of influence as Tetsuya Niwa, and is called the "Queen" among students. He is very strong intellectually but performs very poorly in physical education. He has been close to Omi since his Elementary days, going as far as making him hack into the BL academy server when Omi didn't receive the platinum paper. He also has close contact with the chairman and contacts him if something sprouts up. Even though he is called the "Queen," he hates it when someone treats him like a female.
Tetsuya Niwa (丹羽 哲也, Niwa Tetsuya)
Voiced by: Katsuyuki Konishi
As the president of the student council, he excels in almost everything, from academics to sports and extracurriculars; he is also known as the "King" at the academy. He regularly neglects his duties leaving them to the very last minute. He also has a tendency to call Kaoru, "Kaoru-chan," which results in the latter hurting him. He has an aversion to cats.
Omi Shichijo (七条 臣, Shichijō Omi)
Voiced by: Tomohiro Tsuboi
Saionji's friend since childhood, he is a person who always smiles. He is extremely talented with computers and can also be extremely dangerous when he wants to. Currently, he helps Saionji at the Treasury/Accounting Department. Nakajima refers to him as a dog. He likes eating sweet foods such as chocolate.
Hideaki Nakajima (中嶋 英明, Nakajima Hideaki)
Voiced by: Toshiyuki Morikawa
He is the vice president of the student council. He appears to be brisk and cool with most of the students, and can usually be found trying to hack the school's treasury records, much to the chagrin of Omi Shichijou. Although appearing to be sarcastic and cruel to others, he does care for Niwa.
Yukihiko Naruse (成瀬 由紀彦, Naruse Yukihiko)
Voiced by: Shinichiro Miki
He is the captain of the tennis club at school. He takes an immediate liking to Keita and calls him "Honey". A little oblivious at times, he is extremely passionate about Keita and is always trying to ask Keita out on dates.
Koji Shinomiya (篠宮 紘司, Shinomiya Kōji)
Voiced by: Ryotaro Okiayu
He is the captain of the archery club. He is a very responsible, big-brother figure. He also holds the position of Dormitory Head. He has a little brother who has cardiac problems. He is very close with Takuto Iwai.
Takuto Iwai (岩井 卓人, Iwai Takuto)
Voiced by: Hirofumi Nojima
He is the president of the art club and a genius artist. On the moody, introspective side, he is very soft-spoken and very humble about his skills as an artist. He is very close with Koji Shinomiya.
Shunsuke Taki (滝 俊介, Taki Shunsuke)
Voiced by: Kenichi Suzumura, Drama voice by: Majima Junji
He is a superb cyclist who ranked the third in the National Tournament. Cuter and shorter than others of his age, he is characterised by his Kansai ben dialect. Taki also does freelance delivery work for most of the student body.
Satoshi Umino (海野 聡, Umino Satoshi)
Voiced by: Tomoko Kawakami, Drama voice by: Amada Mahito
Although he is the oldest character, he is also the youngest-looking. He is extremely good at research but can barely take care of himself as he is quite absent-minded. He is both a teacher and researcher for the Bell Liberty. He is also very strong as a result of constantly carrying an overweight cat wherever he goes.
Kakeru Ozawa (小澤 翔, Ozawa Kakeru) and Wataru Ozawa (小澤 渉, Ozawa Wataru)
Voiced by: Ken Takeuchi and Takahiro Mizushima, respectively
Twins who tease Keita. Kakeru and Wataru are never seen apart. They are always getting into trouble and are very good at doubles tennis. They are also known as the "terrible twosome". Later in the anime, the twins seem to become fonder of Keita, but don't admit this till the last episode when the say that they might become his friends.
Jin Matsuoka (松岡 迅, Matsuoka Jin)
Voiced by: Ken Narita
The school nurse of Bell Liberty, he is Kazuki's mentor and former tutor, and the two are very close. It is revealed in later episodes that he attended Bell Liberty himself with his friend, Hiroya Yoshizumi, to whom he was very close. He has a dark secret and will go to any means to fulfill his own agenda such as kidnapping to Keita, who contracted the same virus as Hiroya Yoshizumi, his friend.
Hiroya Yoshizumi (吉住 比呂哉, Yoshizumi Hiroya)
Voiced by: Daisuke Kirii
Childhood friend of Matsuoka, they attended Bell Liberty together. He went into the medical field, like Matsuoka, after graduation, but contracted the "X7 virus". In the last episode while Jin Matsuoka watches the shooting stars Hiroya wakes up and greets him saying that it felt like he was asleep for a while and he woke up and he "heard Jin's voice".

== Games ==
=== Specs ===
Version	Platform	Publisher	Date	Character Voices
Windows Gakuen Heaven: Boy's Love Scramble	Windows 95/98/2000/Me/XP, Mac OS 8/9	SPRAY	August 2, 2002	Not voiced
PS2 Gakuen Heaven: Boy's Love Scramble	PlayStation 2	NEC Interchannel	November 27, 2003	Fully Voiced
PS2 Gakuen Heaven: Type B	PlayStation 2	NEC Interchannel	July 22, 2004	Fully Voiced
PS2 Gakuen Heaven: Okawari	PlayStation 2	NEC Interchannel	February 24, 2005	Fully Voiced
PSP Gakuen Heaven: Boy's Love Scramble	PlayStation Portable	Prototype	November 26, 2009	Fully Voiced
PSP Gakuen Heaven: Okawari	PlayStation Portable	Prototype	February 10, 2011	Fully Voiced
Windows Gakuen Heaven 2: Double Scramble	Windows 8/7/Vista/XP	SPRAY	July 11, 2014	Fully Voiced
Windows Gakuen Heaven: Mixed Edition	Windows 8/7/Vista/XP	SPRAY	September 26, 2014	Not Voiced
PSVita Gakuen Heaven: Boy's Love Scramble	PlayStation Vita	Prototype	February 11, 2015	Fully Voiced
PSP Gakuen Heaven 2: Double Scramble	PlayStation Portable	Prototype	April 23, 2015	Fully Voiced
PSVita Gakuen Heaven 2: Double Scramble	PlayStation Vita	Prototype	April 23, 2015	Fully Voiced

=== Boy's Love Scramble ===
In the original game, the player Keita Itō suddenly received an acceptance letter from the renowned Bell Liberty Academy (also known as BL Gakuen). Attracted by the prestige of the school, he decided to attend. However, on the day of his transfer, the bridge joining the school and the academy, which was located on a remote man-made island, suddenly raised and his bus fell. Luckily, no one was injured but the accident aroused the attention of both the student council's president Niwa Tetsuya as well as the head of the accounting department Saiyonji Kaoru. After explaining briefly the cause of the accident, they guided Keita to his classroom where he met his classmate Endou Kazuki, who kindly befriended Keita and showed him around the campus. On the school grounds, Keita met the rest of the important students in the game: Naruse Yukihiko, captain of the tennis club; Shinomiya Kouji, captain of the archery club; Iwai Takuto, captain of the art club; and Taki Shunsuke, a genius cyclist; the vice president of the student council, Nakajima Hideaki; the genius programmer, Shichijou Omi; as well as the child-looking teacher Umino Satoshi. The objective of the game is to solve the mysteries surrounding Keita's sudden transfer to BL Academy.

=== Okawari ===
A fan disc titled Gakuen Heaven Okawari! (学園へヴン おかわりっ!, "Academy Heaven Second Helping!") was released for PlayStation 2. The story takes place three months after the first game. This time, Keita picked up a cursed ring that would take away his major ability – luck. The characters are the same as in the Windows Game and the objective this time is to find the way to release Keita from the curse of the ring.

=== Double Scramble ===
In the sequel Gakuen Heaven 2 ~Double Scramble!~ (学園ヘヴン2 ～DOUBLE SCRAMBLE！～), released in April 2015, the player Yuki Asahina is invited to study at the near-legendary Bell Liberty Academy despite possessing no remarkable skill or a talent of any distinction save his uncanny good luck. On his first day Yuki is inexplicably entrusted with a mysterious armband that marks him to all as the Ace; the school's new student council president. There is little for Yuki to celebrate, however, as the position of student council president has been reduced to a powerless servant, responsible for nothing besides the menial chores that Durak, Bell Liberty's disciplinary committee and the school's true authority, consider beneath them. After befriending classmate Tomo Kasahara and student council peers Kuya Sagimori and Masatsugu Takato, Yuki is introduced to the other important students in the game: other friends Arata Minase, a champion diver; and musician Reon Yagami; as well as Durak rivals Kiyotada Jokawa, Durak leader; Hayato Chiba, martial artist; and Eiji Sonoda, chef extraordinaire. Yuki must uncover and overcome a conspiracy; forming a partnership and, potentially, a relationship with a fellow student to save not only his position as council president, but the whole of Bell Liberty Academy.

== Anime ==
=== Summary ===
Keita Itō receives a Platinum Paper, the special letter of admission from Bell Liberty Academy, a prestigious all-boys school that only accepts the cream of the crop. Though he doubts his ability to succeed at such a school because he is a transfer student coming in the middle of the year, and he has no special ability that he can speak of, he accepts the admission. Keita is picked up by Niwa, the president of the student council, and from then on, he is warmly welcomed to BL Academy by everyone.

Keita's first actual friend is Endō Kazuki, who immediately takes Keita under his wing and takes care of him to the extent that Keita laughingly dubs him "grandmother." The two of them become a steadfast pair, but in the days that Kazuki is not around, Keita has no trouble finding other company among the other students.

Occasionally Keita has flashbacks to his childhood, where he is playing with an older boy whom he calls "Kazu-nii." He can't remember much except that he and "Kazu-nii" were close at one point, but these memories seem irrelevant to his current life, so Keita dismisses them.

Meanwhile, Kazuki is involved in a power struggle with the Vice Chairman of the board. The Vice Chairman (Kuganuma) is distinctly annoyed that the former chairman chose to leave his position to Kazuki. He views Kazuki as a young and incompetent despot incapable of running BL Academy, much less the Suzubishi Group, the business group that owns BL Academy and many scientific research and development companies. Indeed, Kazuki rejects many of Kuganuma's proposals and seemingly "abuses" his power by admitting a student of no particular skill — in this case, Itō Keita — to BL Academy.

While Kazuki is away on business, Kuganuma summons Keita to his office and informs him that his admission to the school was unauthorized and a mistake, and that he is to be expelled from the school. At the urging of his friends, Keita emails the chairman to protest, and the MVP Battle is created in response. The MVP Battle is a contest for teams of two, and the winners can choose to have any wish granted; unsurprisingly, Keita teams up with Kazuki with the goal of asking for his expulsion to be overturned.

Unknown to Keita, Kazuki stakes his position on the outcome of the MVP Battle - that is, if he and Keita do not manage to win the competition, he will resign his position as chairman. Fortunately, they manage to succeed despite the obstacles in their path - both part of the competition and from outside interference - and Keita's place at the school is secured.

A short time after winning the MVP Battle, Keita is invited out by the school nurse, Dr. Jin Matsuoka, who takes him to an abandoned building. The doctor reveals that Keita was once infected with a dangerous virus that the Suzubishi Group had been researching, but recovered thanks to the administration of an experimental vaccine. Yoshizumi Hiroya, one of the researchers on the project, was also infected, but he reacted badly to the vaccine and has been in a coma ever since. The Suzubishi Group hushed up the incident, and it fell to Dr. Matsuoka to provide for Hiroya's medical expenses.

Dr. Matsuoka intends to force Kazuki to take responsibility for his family's neglect of Hiroya, using Keita as a bargaining chip. Kazuki and Dr. Matsuoka struggle, but in the end Keita wins the doctor over, offering himself as a research subject for the development of a new vaccine that can help Hiroya.

The series ends with both couples - Keita and Kazuki, Jin and Hiroya - reunited and realizing their feelings for each other.

=== Episodes ===
The series premiered on Toku in the United States in January 2016.

No.	Title	Original release date
1	"An Out of Season Transfer Student"; Transliteration: "Kisetsu Hazure no Tenkōsei" (Japanese: 季節はずれの転校生)	April 1, 2006
Ito Keita, an average boy, gets to attend Bell Liberty, an all-boys school where everyone has a special skill.
2	"The Heaven We Reached"; Transliteration: "Tadoritsuita Hevun" (Japanese: たどりついたヘヴン)	April 8, 2006
After an accident on the bridge, what happens to Keita and Niwa is revealed.
3	"Circulating Letter, Wavering Feelings"; Transliteration: "Meguri Tegami, Yureru Omoi" (Japanese: 巡る手紙、揺れる想い)	April 15, 2006
A mysterious letter is entrusted to Keita and he has to show it to the club presidents.
4	"Steam! A Stormy Welcoming Party"; Transliteration: "Yukemuri! Haran no Kangeikai" (Japanese: 湯煙！波乱の歓迎会)	April 22, 2006
It's Keita's first day of school, and after that it's the long-awaited welcome party.
5	"Heaven's Door"; Transliteration: "Hevunzu Doa" (Japanese: ヘヴンズ・ドア)	April 29, 2006
Keita and the others go looking for tonosama.
6	"Date Weather"; Transliteration: "Dēto Hiyori" (Japanese: デート日和)	May 6, 2006
It's the first Sunday since Keita came to the academy. He goes on a date with Kazuki to the town near the school.
7	"The Whereabouts of Anxiety"; Transliteration: "Fuan no Arika" (Japanese: 不安の在処(ありか))	May 13, 2006
The vice chairman suggests that Keita drop out of school. And where is Kazuki?
8	"The Night Before the MVP Battle"; Transliteration: "MVP Senzenya" (Japanese: MVP戦前夜)	May 20, 2006
A series of challengers for the students where they have to be in pairs, is this the chairman's way of helping Keita?
9	"The Steel Flower"; Transliteration: "Hagane no Hana" (Japanese: 鋼の花)	May 27, 2006
At last the MVP battle starts. What is the answer to all these codes?
10	"The Key to Memories"; Transliteration: "Kioku no Kagi" (Japanese: 記憶の鍵)	June 3, 2006
The MVP battle is in its second round. Will Keita and Kazuki be able to work it out?
11	"Revealed Truth"; Transliteration: "Akasareta Shinjitsu" (Japanese: 明かされた真実)	June 10, 2006
Keita and Kazuki won the MVP battle but Kazuki seems to be avoiding Keita. Will Kazuki tell him why?
12	"A Flower That Won't Bend to the Wind"; Transliteration: "Kaze ni Orenai Hana" (Japanese: 風に折れない花)	June 17, 2006
Dr. Jin takes Keita away so he could tell him a secret: the reason that he is at the academy.
13	"Promise ~Always~"; Transliteration: "Yakusoku ~Always~" (Japanese: 約束)	June 24, 2006
Keita figures out his feelings for Kazuki and Kazuki tells Keita that he loves him.

== Drama CDs ==
5 drama CDs have been released. Aside from the first drama CD, the core cast remains the same for all other products in the franchise and is based on the casting in the PlayStation 2 games.

Full-length drama

- Gakuen Heaven 1: Mirai wa Kimi no Mono
- Gakuen Heaven 2: Muteki no Sannensei
- Gakuen Heaven 2: Tsuyoki na Ninensei
- Gakuen Heaven 2: Welcome to Heaven
- Gakuen Heaven 3: Happy Paradise

Mini drama

- Gakuen Heaven: Bitter Chocolate
- Gakuen Heaven: Sweet Candy

== Manga ==
The 5-volume manga series by You Higuri began in 2003. Each volume is an alternate-universe story following Keita's relationship with one of the possible romantic interests. The series was licensed in English by Tokyopop's yaoi imprint, BLU. Due to the closure of Tokyopop's North American publishing operations in 2011, only the first three volumes were published in English.

== Web radio ==
Since March 2006, there has been a web radio show on Marine Entertainment's site to promote the anime. It is anchored by the cover voice for Keita Itō, Fukuyama Jun, and every 12 days, there are guests from the regular cast.

== Reception ==
Melissa Harper of Anime News Network describes the manga as derivative, but enjoyable, with a romantic sex scene. IGN reviewer A. E. Sparrow found the manga surprisingly well-paced and enjoyable, despite its roots in a dating sim. Sandra Scholes, writing for Active Anime, found the manga's art to be very good. Nadia Oxford, writing for Mania Entertainment, felt that the manga did not rise above other BL manga, its only distinction being its video game origins.
