= Arabians Lost: The Engagement on Desert =

2006 video game

- Box art for the Japanese PlayStation 2 release of Arabians Lost: The Engagement on Desert
- Developer: QuinRose
- Publishers: QuinRose & Prototype
- Platforms: Windows, PlayStation 2, Nintendo DS
- Release: Windows: JP: 8 August 2006; PlayStation 2: JP: 11 October 2007; Nintendo DS: JP: 9 September 2009
- Genres: Role-playing video game, visual novel
- Mode: Single-player

Arabians Lost: The Engagement on Desert (アラビアンズ・ロスト ～The engagement on desert～) is a Japanese female-oriented romance adventure otome game developed by QuinRose. It has been released in Japan for three different consoles. The PC version was released by QuinRose on 8 August 2006. Later, the PlayStation 2 version was released by Prototype on 18 September 2007. It was also released for the Nintendo DS by Prototype in 2009.

== Plot ==
Arabians Lost is Quinrose's second game with a desert setting. The main character, Aileen Olazabal, is the only daughter and princess of Gilkhatar who wants nothing more than to lead a normal life and not be a princess. However, nearing her birthday, the king and queen decided that she should marry, and that they had decided on a husband for her.

Wanting to have a normal life (which includes having a normal romance, falling in love etc.), Aileen refused. This led to a wager between Aileen and her parents; if Aileen could raise 10,000,000 Gils in 25 days, she would be free to do what she wanted. If she failed, then she would have to do what her parents said. The king then told Aileen that there were six young men she could ask as companions.

== Characters ==
- Aileen Olazabal: The main female protagonist of the series. Aileen hasn't been raised like other princesses; where other princesses learn how to dance or to sing, Aileen learns how to pick locks and to fight.
- Curtis Nile: The head of assassins' guild with an everlasting smile on his face. A genius in his field who can be very, very scary even when he's smiling. He grew up in the slums and always looks cheerful. He is also a minor character in another Quinrose game, Crimson Empire.
- Roberto Cromwell: The manager of a successful casino who's also an addicted gambler (and also an excellent cheater at it and is never caught). He loves gambling, and gambles on chances (not just cards). However he's also an excellent and ambitious businessman and this serves in making his casino prosperous.
- Shark Brandon: The head of the trader's guild who's said to be a genius and who's said to always be able get whatever he wants. Although not many could even imagine it, he's actually an excellent doctor as well. However he also has a bad taste, being an upstart...
- Stuart Sink: Heir to the north business district, a handsome but cold man. Related to Tyrone, although the relationship between the two is very bad. A calculating man who's also a neat-freak. Childhood friend with Aileen and Tyrone.
- Tyrone Bale: Heir to the south business district, a man who is quick to anger. Related to Stuart, although the relationship between the two is very bad. A man who appears rude, even though he's actually generous. Childhood friend with Aileen and Stuart.
- Lille Sluman: Aileen's tutor. A strict person who can be gentle from time to time. He's old friends with Robert. He has an injured leg, and the sword cane he uses is a present from Robert.

== Development and release ==
Developed by QuinRose, the game was first released for Windows on 8 August 2006. On 18 September 2007, the game was released for the PlayStation 2 by Prototype. In October 2008, it was announced that the game would the released by Prototype on the Nintendo DS, the game was released on 10 September 2009.
