= Stranger of Sword City =

2014 video game

- Xbox 360 boxart
- Developer: Experience
- Publishers: WW: Experience; JP: 5pb. (PC); NA/EU: NIS America (Vita, PC)
- Director: Motoya Ataka
- Platforms: Xbox 360; Microsoft Windows; PlayStation Vita; Xbox One; Nintendo Switch
- Release: Xbox 360: JP: June 5, 2014; Microsoft Windows: JP: August 22, 2014; WW: June 6, 2016; PlayStation Vita: JP: January 22, 2015; NA: April 26, 2016; PAL: April 29, 2016; Xbox One: NA: March 22, 2016; JP: March 24, 2016; Nintendo Switch: NA: March 16, 2021; EU: March 19, 2021; OC: March 23, 2021
- Genres: Role-playing, dungeon crawler
- Mode: Single-player

Stranger of Sword City (剣の街の異邦人, Tsurugi no machi no ihoujin), originally titled The Stranger in Alda, is a dungeon crawler role-playing video game developed by Experience, developer of Demon Gaze, for Microsoft Windows, Xbox 360, PlayStation Vita and Xbox One. The Japanese Xbox 360 and Vita versions have different subtitles: the Xbox 360 and Windows version is subtitled White Royal Palace (白の王宮, Shiro no ōkyū), whilst the Vita version is subtitled Black Palace (黒の宮殿, Kuro no kyūden). The Xbox 360 version was released in Japan on June 5, 2014, and the PC and PS Vita versions followed in August 2014 and January 2015. The game was released internationally in 2016. An updated version of the game titled Stranger of Sword City Revisited (新釈・剣の街の異邦人 ～黒の宮殿～) was released for PlayStation Vita on July 21, 2016, in Japan and internationally on February 28, 2017.

== Gameplay ==
Stranger of Sword City is a dungeon crawler style role-playing video game. Players progress through the game by navigating through dungeons laden with hazardous booby traps.

== Development and release ==
Stranger of Sword City was originally announced in June 2012 with a 2013 release date. In April 2013, director Motoya Ataka announced that the game was "in the middle stage of development", with the music " about 80% complete." However, it was announced in September 2013 that due to delays, the game has been postponed, and will instead release in early 2014. In September 2013, Experience asked in for fans to submit concepts for boss characters, including "boss monsters for the end of the story, a top class boss for the middle of the game, a boss that has a unique fighting space like underwater or outer space, a flying or floating boss, a monster with scales, and "god" tiers for regular enemies." A teaser trailer was announced on February 7, 2014. It was also announced that the game, which was originally only planned for release on the PC and Xbox 360 platforms, would also be available for the PlayStation Vita. A new version of the game with a new graphical style, was released in March 2016 for the Xbox One.

== Reception ==
Stranger of Sword City has an average score of 71 on Metacritic based on a total of 24 reviews. For the Xbox One version, the game has an average score of 70 based on a total of 12 reviews.

Four Famitsu reviewers gave the Xbox 360 version of Stranger of Sword City 8, 9, 8 and 7 out of 10, for a total of 32/40.
