= Alice in the Country of Hearts =

2007 video game

- Heart no Kuni no Alice original visual novel cover.

ハートの国のアリス～Wonderful Wonder World～ (Hāto no Kuni no Arisu~Wandafuru Wandā Wārudo~)
- Video game
- Developer: Quin Rose
- Publisher: Quin Rose (PC); Prototype (PS2/PSP)
- Genre: Otome game, Visual novel
- Platform: PC, PlayStation 2, PlayStation Portable
- Released: JP: February 14, 2007 (PC); JP: September 18, 2008 (PS2); JP: July 30, 2009 (PSP)
- Manga

Heart no Kuni no Alice
- Written by: Quin Rose
- Illustrated by: Soumei Hoshino
- Published by: Mag Garden
- English publisher: NA: Yen Press, Tokyopop
- Magazine: Monthly Comic Avarus
- Original run: October 2007 – October 2010
- Volumes: 6
- Video game

Clover no Kuni no Alice: Wonderful Wonder World
- Developer: Quin Rose
- Publisher: Quin Rose (PC/PSP); Prototype (PS2)
- Genre: Adventure, Otome game, Visual novel
- Platform: PC, PlayStation 2, PlayStation Portable
- Released: JP: December 25, 2007 (PC); JP: April 15, 2010 (PS2); JP: March 31, 2011 (PSP)
- Video game

Joker no Kuni no Alice: Wonderful Wonder World
- Developer: Quin Rose
- Publisher: Quin Rose
- Genre: Adventure, Otome game, Visual novel
- Platform: PC, PlayStation Portable
- Released: JP: October 31, 2009 (PC); JP: October 27, 2011 (PSP)
- Video game

Anniversary no Kuni no Alice: Wonderful Wonder World
- Developer: Quin Rose
- Publisher: Quin Rose
- Genre: Adventure, Otome game, Visual novel
- Platform: PC; PlayStation Portable
- Released: JP: March 14, 2010 (PC); JP: July 28, 2011 (PSP)
- Manga

Joker no Kuni no Alice: Circus to Usotsuki Game
- Written by: Quin Rose
- Illustrated by: Mamenosuke Fujimaru
- Published by: Ichijinsha
- English publisher: NA: Seven Seas Entertainment
- Magazine: Comic Zero Sum
- Original run: June 2011 – February 2014
- Volumes: 7
- Anime film

Alice in the Country of Hearts: Wonderful Wonder World
- Directed by: Hideaki Ōba
- Produced by: Yutaka Ōhashi; Kōji Sone
- Written by: Kō Ishizuki
- Music by: Mari
- Studio: Asahi Production
- Released: July 30, 2011
- Runtime: 85 minutes
- Video game

Omochabako no Kuni no Alice: Wonderful Wonder World
- Developer: Quin Rose
- Publisher: Quin Rose
- Genre: Adventure, Otome game, Visual novel
- Platform: PlayStation Portable
- Released: JP: December 22, 2011
- Video game

Diamond no Kuni no Alice: Wonderful Wonder World
- Developer: Quin Rose
- Publisher: Quin Rose
- Genre: Adventure, Otome game, Visual novel
- Platform: PlayStation Portable
- Released: JP: December 20, 2012
- Video game

Diamond no Kuni no Alice: Wonderful Mirror World
- Developer: Quin Rose
- Publisher: Quin Rose
- Genre: Adventure, Otome game, Visual novel
- Platform: PlayStation Portable
- Released: JP: July 25, 2013
- Video game

Heart no Kuni no Alice: Wonderful Twin World
- Developer: Quin Rose
- Publisher: Quin Rose
- Genre: Adventure, Otome game, Visual novel
- Platform: PlayStation Portable
- Released: JP: May 29, 2014
- Video game

Spade no Kuni no Alice: ~Wonderful White World~
- Developer: Idea Factory
- Publisher: Otomate
- Genre: Adventure, Otome game, Visual novel
- Platform: Nintendo Switch
- Released: JP: September 30, 2021
- Video game

Spade no Kuni no Alice: ~Wonderful Black World~
- Developer: Idea Factory
- Publisher: Otomate
- Genre: Adventure, Otome game, Visual novel
- Platform: Nintendo Switch
- Released: JP: August 3, 2023

Alice in the Country of Hearts (ハートの国のアリス～Wonderful Wonder World～, Hāto no Kuni no Arisu ~Wandafuru Wandā Wārudo~) is a Japanese female-oriented visual novel developed by Quin Rose. The game is a re-imagining of Lewis Carroll's classic 1865 novel Alice's Adventures in Wonderland. There are multiple sequel games, as well as multiple manga series, licensed in North America originally by Tokyopop and later by Yen Press and Seven Seas Entertainment. An original video animation adaptation was announced for release in November 2008, but was later delayed. Instead, an anime film adaptation produced by Asahi Production was released in Japanese theaters in July 2011.

In June 2019, Idea Factory's Otomate revived QuinRose as QuinRose reborn and announced a new project for Nintendo Switch, titled Alice in the Country of Spades (スペードの国のアリス, Supēdo no kuni no Arisu), divided into two games titled Alice in the Country of Spades ～Wonderful White World～ and Alice in the Country of Spades ～Wonderful Black World～. The games were released on September 30, 2021 and August 3, 2023 respectively, with a compilation of both games called the White & Black Edition releasing on the same day as the latter.

== Plot ==
Alice Liddell is an insecure girl who is overshadowed by her sister's beauty and grace. During one of their outings, Alice's sister goes to get a deck of cards for a game while Alice falls asleep. When a white rabbit comes and encourages her to chase him, Alice assumes she is dreaming and tries to go back to napping until the rabbit turns into a man with white rabbit ears and carries her off. Peter White (the White Rabbit) throws Alice into a hole that appears in her yard and jumps in after her. When they land in a strange, open area, Peter starts confessing his undying love for her. He tells her to drink a 'medicine' but when she refuses, he simply pours the liquid into his mouth and then kisses her, forcing her to drink it. It is later revealed that whoever drinks this medicine, participates in a game, so says Peter. Alice learns that she is in Wonderland and the only way she might be able to return to her world is to interact and spend time with the strange people in Wonderland, which slowly refills the vial. However, Wonderland is going through violent times—everyone is reckless and uncaring as to who lives or dies, and with a civil war going on everyone in the strange world finds it hard to trust each other with an instinct to kill.

Wonderland is split into various countries, with most of the action taking place in the 'Country of Hearts'. It is divided into three main territories: The Castle of Hearts, ruled by Vivaldi (the Queen of Hearts), with assistance from Peter White who serves as Prime Minister, and Ace (the Knight of Hearts), the most skilled swordsman in the Wonderland, who has a terrible sense of direction; Hatter Mansion, home of Wonderland's Mafia, The Hatters, led by Blood Dupre (The Hatter), with help from his second-in-command Elliot March (the March Hare) and the gatekeepers, Tweedledee and Tweedledum (Tweedle Dee and Tweedle Dum); and the Amusement Park, run by the marquis Mary Gowland (the Duke) with help from a punkish cat, Boris Airay (the Cheshire Cat). All three territories are at war with each other, with the only neutral area being the Clock Tower Plaza in the centre of the Country of Hearts. Alice moves into the Tower and ends up living and helping Julius Monrey, whose job it is to repair clocks, which work as the hearts of the inhabitants of Wonderland. As a result, he is considered Wonderland's mortician and he gives life to new residents once the Clocks are repaired. Also appearing in the series is the sickly Nightmare Gottschalk (the Caterpillar), a dream demon who is the embodiment of bad dreams and ruler of the neighbouring 'Country of Clover'.

== Characters ==
=== Alice Liddell ===
Alice Liddell (アリス=リデル, Arisu Rideru)
Voiced by: Rie Kugimiya (anime film)
Based on the character from Lewis Carroll's original book, who was named after Carroll's friend, Alice Liddell, she is one of the very few characters who are similar in personality and physical appearance to the original book. She reacts to everything a little bit more realistically than the original Alice and questions her surroundings, but she is still dreamy and absent-minded. Many of the other characters note that Alice unintentionally leads them on. Her views on life in general have made her a valuable part of Wonderland life. The inhabitants fall in love with her because she values life, unlike the people who live there. She often considers returning home, but is dissuaded by painful headaches induced by Nightmare whenever she tries to recall memories of her sisters Edith and Lorina. In the manga, she chooses to reside in the neutral Clock Tower with Julius Monrey.

=== Country of Hearts ===
The Country of Hearts is the primary setting of the Alice in the Country of Hearts series and the first Wonderland location that Alice visits. The majority of characters in the series originate from this country. The country has the unusual property of changing the time of day seemingly sporadically.

Blood Dupre (ブラッド=デュプレ, Buraddo Dupure)
Voiced by: Katsuyuki Konishi
Leader of the Hatters, Blood is charming, flirtatious, laid-back and loves black tea, but is nothing like the Mad Hatter, the character he represents. He rules the Hatter's Mansion area and is strongly hated by Mary Gowland for making his name known throughout the Land of Hearts. He is also involved in a civil war with the Queen of Hearts. Alice notices right away that he looks exactly like her ex-boyfriend. Nightmare created his face to look identically like her ex-boyfriend, though his reasons for doing so are unknown. In the beginning, Blood states he has no intention of loving Alice, and discusses trying to kill her. He even attempts to choke her at one point, and shoots at her during a ball held by Vivaldi. However, like many others, Blood develops a strong interest in her, and antagonizes Julius just so Alice will leave Julius to stay with Blood, though she never actually leaves the Clock Tower. It is even suggested later in the manga that Blood is in fact jealous and directs his negative feelings at Alice. In the games, he is a bit less violent toward Alice than in the manga. They share a kiss at the end of the manga. He and Vivaldi are siblings. Blood's weapon is a rifle.
Elliot March (エリオット=マーチ, Eriotto Māchi)
Voiced by: Tsuguo Mogami
Other than having a pair of brown hare ears, Elliot shares no likeness with the March Hare, upon which he is based. He first seems willing to help Alice, until he points his weapon at her and says he wants to "test his new gun". In the manga, Elliot later comes across as a kind and sweet person with the willingness to kill people without hesitation. Elliot is dedicated to serving Blood, due to the fact that Blood helped Elliot escape prison for a terrible sin. Elliot had destroyed his friend's clock (the people of Wonderland have clocks instead of hearts, and when repaired the clocks become a new person), as his friend had wished. Because Wonderland needs replacements, the act of destroying a clock is taboo and he was thrown in jail. Elliot constantly states that he isn't a rabbit, instead claiming he is a hare, and claims to not like carrots. Despite this, he is shown to enjoy eating carrot dishes. Elliot also has a gun.
Tweedle Dee and Tweedle Dum (トゥイードル=ディー、トゥイードル=ダム, Tuīdoru Dī, Tuīdoru Damu)
Voiced by: Jun Fukuyama
Twins based on the characters Tweedledum and Tweedledee who, besides being twins and finishing each others' sentences on occasion, look and act nothing like their counterparts. Dee and Dum are the young gatekeepers to the Hatter Mansion. Due to their young age, they often slack off and love money and killing. They have violent tendencies and actually tried to kill Alice upon first meeting her, thinking that slitting her throat would be a fun game. They don't think life is important, thinking that Alice, like everyone else, will have a replacement. In the second game Clover no Kuni no Alice, they are revealed to be able to transform into adult forms at will. Both twins wield an axe.
Boris Airay (ボリス=エレイ, Borisu Erei)
Voiced by: Noriaki Sugiyama
Boris is the counterpart of the Cheshire Cat; like the character he is based on, Boris loves riddles. He has functional cat ears and a tail, several piercings and tattoos, and dresses in short, exposing outfits with a pink boa and a collar with a chain. Boris works in the Amusement Park District for Mary Gowland. Though he is a sly, devious character with a childish persona, he becomes close to Alice. He is friends with Dee and Dum, despite the fact that they work for opposing groups, and even goes to Hatter Mansion to have tea parties and interact with Elliot and Blood. Boris has on numerous occasions, snuck into the Castle of Hearts. When his luck ran out, Alice found him badly wounded and bloody, and after a reprimanding from Alice, Boris promised to change his careless and ruthless ways for Alice's sake. When Ace threatens to kill Alice, Boris only shoots at his feet saying, "I can't kill you because it would make Alice sad." He gets mad at Ace when he kills in front of Alice. Like many others in the Land of Hearts, he also falls in love with Alice. Boris uses a gun.
Mary Gowland (メリー=ゴーランド, Merī Gōrando)
Voiced by: Kenyu Horiuchi
Boss of the Amusement Park, Gowland is a marquis and semi owner of Cheshire Cat. However he gets angry at Boris when he bleeds on his floor. Other than those times he enjoys the company of him and Alice. He is an older man with mood swings, but is generally a cheery and very social person. He has the power to pull out his violin, which turns into a kind of gun or rifle at his will, in various sizes, though he has no talent playing it. He invites Alice to come to the park any time she likes and visits her at the Clock Tower. Gowland is the archenemy of Blood Dupre, who told everyone Gowland's first name is Mary, making his name 'Mary Gowland', like the term merry-go-round. Dupre seems eager to pick fights with Gowland, making fun of him and his name, throwing Gowland into a violent rage. Mery's Violin turns into a variable sized gun.
Vivaldi (ビバルディ, Bibarudi)
Voiced by: Yuhko Kaida
Vivaldi is based upon The Queen of Hearts. Like the character in Carroll's book, she regularly orders the beheading of servants for the smallest of mishaps. She tends to use the majestic plural and is demanding and dangerous. A beautiful and composed woman who shows little emotion, she does expose her feelings towards Blood when Peter and Ace inform her of his interest and advances to Alice. She loves cute things and has a secret room full of stuffed animals. Only a few select maids know of her collection. Vivaldi is secretly Blood's older sister and as the Queen of Hearts, and she is the only person aside from Alice who is able to keep Peter in line. Vivaldi has no weapon.
Peter White (ペーター=ホワイト, Pētā Howaito)
Voiced by: Kōki Miyata
Other than having a pair of white rabbit ears, wearing a watch, and wearing a suit coat he has little in common with the White Rabbit upon which he is based. He is the first to meet Alice and claims to be desperately in love with her; his sociopathic tendencies mean that he will not hesitate to kill anyone he dislikes, especially if they get between him and Alice. Alice mentions hating him on several instances, but he is persistent in gaining her love. Peter is able to turn into an actual rabbit, which he does so in order to gain Alice's affections since she has a soft spot for his rabbit form, and works for the Queen of Hearts in Heart Castle as a Prime Minister. He is often caught rhyming as he speaks, however in the original version he is heard talking normally without rhyming. It appears he and Nightmare know why Alice was brought to his world and it appears he is somehow connected to her older sister. Peter's weapon of choice is a gun he keeps in a holster on his belt.
Ace (エース, Ēsu)
Voiced by: Daisuke Hirakawa
Ace is an original character, though he is possibly based on the Knave of Hearts. He is the Knight of Heart Castle and considered the most skilled swordsman in Wonderland, but has a notoriously bad sense of direction and often forgets how to get to places. Though, seemingly harmless at first, he becomes more devious over time and demonstrates a tendency towards violence. His lost adventures are revealed to be assassinations of people that the Joker or the Clockmaker want him to kill; he helps Julius Monrey collect clocks from people who have died while killing those who get in his way. Ace is one of the first characters to admit that he has no romantic interest in Alice, though that changes shortly after he says it. Despite confessing to love Alice, she notes how he used her as a shield when Peter threatened to shoot him. He almost kills Alice because she is changing everyone in Wonderland, but mentions that if he killed her, he couldn't hear her heartbeat anymore, so he changes his mind. He is also revealed to be the warden of the prison in Wonderland. Ace is adept with a sword but will use a gun if he has to.
Julius Monrey (ユリウス=モンレー, Yuriusu Monrē)
Voiced by: Takehito Koyasu
Julius is an original character, though it is suggested that he represents Time (who has an argument with the Mad Hatter), from the original Alice in Wonderland book. He is in charge of the only neutral district, the Clock Tower Plaza; it is also shown that he controls the world's time. As the fixer of clocks, he is regarded as the mortician of Wonderland, since the fixed clocks will become the hearts of reborn Wonderland residents. Julius is initially the closest character to Alice; she trusts him and lives in his Clock Tower with him. While seemingly apathetic and anti-social, several characters mention how much he must like Alice because of his eagerness to help her get home and to give her a room to stay in. Later on, Julius shows jealousy towards the other men in Alice's life and tells her to leave, saying that she can go where ever she chooses as he thinks she feels obligated to stay. When Alice refuses to leave, Julius admits that he doesn't find her annoying. As his attachment to Alice grows, he becomes protective of her when other characters threaten to take her away. Alice mentions that Julius is a workaholic; going extended periods of time without food or sleep, and that there were times she returned to find him collapsed on the floor. It is seen that Julius does not like roller coasters, crowds, and Blood Dupre. Julius, like most other characters uses a gun.

=== Country of Clover ===
The Country of Clover is the primary setting of Alice in the Country of Clover, the sequel to the Alice in the Country of Hearts, and the second Wonderland location introduced. While the game retains most of the characters from Country of Hearts, the game removes Julius Monrey and Mary Gowland in favour of two new characters, Pierce Villiers and Gray Ringmarc. Nightmare and Joker, who also appeared in the Country of Hearts, have larger roles in the Country of Clover. In contrast to how time of day changes in the Country of Hearts, the Country of Clover is known for changing its seasons at will.

Pierce Villiers (ピアス=ヴィリエ, Piasu Virie)
Voiced by: Sōichirō Hoshi
Pierce is the counterpart of the Dormouse and is the undertaker for the Hatters. He has functional mouse ears and a tail and suffers from insomnia as a result of constantly drinking coffee out of paranoia at the thought of being eaten by Boris. He used to work for the Hatter family, but ran away prior to the beginning of the series due to being terrorized by Boris and the twins. He adores Nightmare because he helps him sleep and is often worried about his health. Pierce is terrified of Boris who often tries to eat him and constantly makes him feel like his life is in danger. However, he likes Peter and Elliot because he doesn't feel threatened around rabbits. In a side chapter of the manga, he attempts to kiss Alice soon as he recognizes her as an outsider. Alice slaps him in the face in response and asks him "if he tries to kiss strangers often".
Gray Ringmarc (グレイ=リングマーク, Gurei Ringumāku)
Voiced by: Kazuya Nakai
Gray is based on Bill the Lizard in the original Alice in Wonderland. He works for Nightmare, though is often reduced to acting as a nanny of sorts in order to force Nightmare to do his work, and tends to be a workaholic, pushing his subordinates to do the same. In contrast, he is notably a poor cook and artist, despite his best efforts. By nature Gray is a kind man who cares for people and animals, but he is also a former assassin and a deadly combatant. As a result, he is unwillingly Ace's designated sparring partner as he is the only one who can match the Knight of Heart's skill. Gray often compares and sees himself as inferior to Julius, particularly in regards to his relationship to Alice.
Nightmare Gottschalk (ナイトメア=ゴットシャルク, Naitomea Gottosharuku)
Voiced by: Tomokazu Sugita
Nightmare is based on The Caterpillar in the original Alice in Wonderland, but is usually seen when Alice is sleeping. Later, he comes to the clock tower with a resident of Clover. He is the one who allowed Peter to bring Alice into Wonderland. He calls himself an 'Incubus', claiming he is the embodiment of bad dreams. He interacts mostly with Alice, but also appears before Peter, Julius, and Blood as well. It appears he along with Peter knows why Alice was sent to their world. He also claims to love her. He is sickly in the books and is seen coughing up blood, but hates doctors and injections. He wears an eyepatch for unmentioned reasons and seems to not have any weapon. In the second game Clover no Kuni, he is revealed to be the head of the Clover Tower.

=== Country of Diamond ===
The Country of Diamond is the third original setting for the series and is introduced in Alice in the Country of Diamonds as another region of Wonderland. While a number of major characters return from the first two original games, many appear in different forms from their previous appearances. Three new characters are introduced, while Vivaldi, Pierce Villiers, and Mary Gowland do not return.

Crysta Snowpigeon (クリスタ=スノーピジョン, Kurisuta Sunōpijen)
Voiced by: Sanae Kobayashi
The Queen of the Country of Diamond, Crysta serves as Vivaldi's counterpart in Alice in the Country of Diamond. Though she appears as immaculate as a white pigeon, her neat and clean appearance conceals a far from peaceful personality. She likes frozen things and has made a collection of them; Alice and Nightmare currently number among the two things she wants to freeze most to add to her collection. As with many people in the Country of Diamond, she can appear in the form of a child at certain times and the form of an adult at other times.
Sidney Black (シドニー=ブラック, Shidoni Burakku)
Voiced by: Kosuke Toriumi
Sidney Black is the Black Rabbit and the Prime Minister of the Castle of Diamond. Unlike Peter White, Sidney despises Alice and happens to be very professional when it comes to doing his job, though he is high-strung and gets irritated very easily. He hates the colour white and wants to paint everything black, but endures the Queen of Diamond's love of white as her faithful subordinate. Much to his displeasure, his hair turns white when he is stressed, which increases his stress. As Peter's counterpart, he has short black hair and appears to be a lop ear rabbit with long sloping Black ears.
Jericho Bermuda (ジェリコ=バミューダ, Jeriko Bamuda)
Voiced by: Rikiya Koyama
Jericho Bermuda is the Gravekeeper and head of the Art Gallery in the Country of Diamonds. Based on the Dodo from the original story, Jericho is the head of another Mafia group that is in conflict with the Hatter family, which leaves him rather busy. Because of his role and reputation, people refer to him as the "Man Already Dead."

=== Others ===
Joker (ジョーカー, Jōkā)
Voiced by: Akira Ishida
An enigmatic character who the player must visit and play a card game with in order to change the season in the Alice in the Country of Joker game. Joker is the Circus Master as well as the Chief Prison Guard of Wonderland's Prison Realm. He is not liked by the other roleholders, but is respected by Alice. Two Jokers exist within the story — one is a polite and modest man while in contrast, his counterpart is foul-mouthed and condescending. He also claims Alice needs him. To distinguish the two, Alice refers to the Joker serving as the Circus Master as "White", while the Joker acting primarily as the prison director "Black;" though "Black" appears to be more threatening than his partner, "White" is implied to be the more dangerous of the two. In Joker no Kuni, they are seen executing Alice's older sister, who symbolizes all the memories of Alice that took place before Wonderland.
Lorina Liddell (ロリーナ=リデル, Rorina Rideru)
Voiced by: Mika Kanda
Lorina is Alice's older sister, a graceful young lady whom Alice both admires and feels inferior towards. Alice's inability to leave Wonderland is related to painful memories relating to Lorina and Lorina's relationship with Alice's ex-boyfriend, which continues to trouble Alice each time she tries to remember. Though Alice believes her sister was left behind outside of Wonderland, Lorina's appearance in Wonderland's jail reveals the true reason behind why Alice feels a great deal of pain whenever she attempts to remember Lorina. Lorina is based on Alice's older sister in the original novels, who is based on Alice Liddell's older sister Lorina, who was also a friend of Lewis Carroll.
Edith Liddell (イーディス=リデル, Iideisu Rideru)
Edith is Alice's younger sister, whose memory also brings pain to Alice whenever she tries to remember her. She is said to be attending a boarding school at the beginning of the story, thus she does not accompany Alice and Lorina during their outing that leads to Alice arriving in Wonderland. Alice's only known memory of Edith involves Edith calling Alice coldhearted for not crying at their mother's funeral. Edith is named after Edith Liddell, the younger sister of Alice Liddell and a friend of Lewis Carroll.
King (キング, Kingu)
Known also as the King of Hearts (ハートの王, Haato no Ou), the King of the Country of Hearts is another role amongst the Wonderland residents, albeit a minor one. He and Vivaldi are not married because their ranks are merely roles, though Vivaldi expresses jealousy that the King would have a mistress when she was available to him and she had ordered the mistress to be beheaded, only for the King to pardon the woman to live as a nameless villager. The King is depicted as a kind and elderly man resembling the King of Hearts on playing cards who has the people's best interests at heart. Because Vivaldi holds the real power in the castle, he does not have much of a presence, though he is actually a very talented person and much more capable than Peter. In the Country of Clover, he possesses a much younger appearance of a middle-aged man.
Others
Most of the people of Wonderland are servants and guards. They are men and women who all look the same besides the uniforms they wear that represent their district location. They have no eyes and look and dress the same as the other servants in their district. Citizens of Wonderland think these people are unimportant and identical, but Alice is able to recognize their individual differences. In the manga, the faceless are not given names while in the games, there are instances where the faceless are noted to have their own names.
Besides servants, there are also normal citizens that have no roles in the 'game' of Wonderland. People without roles have no eyes and little to differentiate between them. Vivaldi and Blood (who are, coincidentally, siblings) were once normal children without roles. Among the citizens there are some rebels, who try to destroy their friends' clocks so they cannot be replaced.

== Media ==
=== Visual novels ===
Heart no Kuni no Alice: Wonderful Wonder World is a female-oriented visual novel developed by Quin Rose and released on February 14, 2007, playable on a Microsoft Windows PC. The game is a re-imagining of Lewis Carroll's classic Alice's Adventures in Wonderland. Prototype ported the game to the PlayStation 2 (PS2) on September 18, 2008, and the PlayStation Portable (PSP) on July 30, 2009. An English version of the game, under the title Alice in the Heart: Wonderful Wonder World, was released for iOS and Android devices, with the translation done by Artmove.

Quin Rose released a sequel to Heart no Kuni no Alice titled Clover no Kuni no Alice: Wonderful Wonder World on December 25, 2007, playable on a Windows PC. Prototype ported the game to the PS2 on April 15, 2010, and the PSP on March 31, 2011. It follows the first game under the assumption that Alice did not fall in love with anyone, maintaining only friendships with the major characters. She remains in Wonderland as a result and the setting moves from the Country of Heart to the Country of Clover. Clover no Kuni no Alice replaces Julius Monrey and Mary Gowland with Pierce Villiers, the representation of the Dormouse, and Gray Ringmarc, Nightmare's right-hand man who works more in the capacity of a nanny to his master. Heart and Clover were accompanied by a third game, the fan-disc Joker no Kuni no Alice: Wonderful Wonder World developed by Quin Rose and released on October 31, 2009, playable on a Windows PC. Joker no Kuni no Alice is a side-story to the first two games and reintroduces Julius Monrey and Mary Gowland.

In March 2010, Anniversary no Kuni no Alice: Wonderful Wonder World (アニバーサリーの国のアリス～Wonderful Wonder World～) was released for Windows as a remake of Heart no Kuni no Alice featuring redrawn CGs and new character routes. A version for the PSP was released in July 2011. The game was followed by Omochabako no Kuni no Alice: Wonderful Wonder World (おもちゃ箱の国のアリス～Wonderful Wonder World～) as another fan disc for the PSP in December 2011 that involves 26 different story arcs. Diamond no Kuni no Alice: Wonderful Wonder World (ダイヤの国のアリス～Wonderful Wonder World～) was released on December 20, 2012, for the PSP as the sequel to Clover no Kuni no Alice and introduced new characters and a new region in Wonderland. A sequel to Diamond titled Diamond no Kuni no Alice: Wonderful Mirror World (ダイヤの国のアリス～Wonderful Mirror World～) was released July 25, 2013, for the PSP. On May 29, 2014, a sequel to Heart no Kuni no Alice and its fan disc was released titled Heart no Kuni no Alice: Wonderful Twin World.

=== Manga ===
A manga adaptation illustrated by Soumei Hoshino was serialized in Mag Garden's Monthly Comic Avarus between the October 2007 and October 2010 issues. Six tankōbon volumes were published by Mag Garden between July 10, 2008, and December 15, 2010. The manga was licensed in North America by Tokyopop, who had published five volumes before the license reverted to the owners. At New York Anime Festival 2011, Yen Press announced that it will re-release the manga. Alice in the Country of Hearts is also licensed in Taiwan by Tong Li Publishing, in Italy by GP Publishing and in Poland by Studio JG.

A second manga adaptation illustrated by Mamenosuke Fujimaru and titled Joker no Kuni no Alice: Circus to Usotsuki Game began serialization in the June 2011 issue of Ichijinsha's Comic Zero Sum. An alternate retelling of the story titled Alice in the Country of Hearts: My Fanatic Rabbit (ハートの国のアリス ―My Fanatic Rabbit―), written by Owl Shinotsuki and illustrated by Delico Psyche, was serialized between 2010 and 2011 in Monthly Comic Avarus. Two volumes were released in Japan: the first on December 15, 2010, and the second on August 12, 2011. Yen Press publishes My Fanatic Rabbit in North America.

A manga adaptation illustrated by Soumei Hoshino was serialized in Mag Garden's Monthly Comic Avarus between the October 2007 and October 2010 issues. Six tankōbon volumes were published by Mag Garden between July 10, 2008, and December 15, 2010. The manga was licensed in North America by Tokyopop, which published five volumes before the license reverted to the owners. Yen Press subsequently released the complete series in three omnibus editions in 2012.

Yen Press also published Alice in the Country of Hearts: My Fanatic Rabbit in North America.

The manga is also available in French (Éditions Ki-oon), German (Tokyopop Germany), Italian (GP Manga), Polish (Studio JG), Portuguese (NewPOP) and Chinese (Taiwan - Tong Li Publishing Co., Ltd.).

=== Novels ===
Kodansha published nine novels written by Yukiko Uozumi between February 2008 and March 2011. The first three novels are based on the original Heart no Kuni no Alice game, the next three are based on Clover no Kuni no Alice, and the last three are based on Joker no Kuni no Alice. Ichijinsha published six light novels written by three different authors, but all illustrated by Nana Fumizuki. The first novel is written by Momoko Komaki and was published in July 2008 based on the original Heart no Kuni no Alice game. Two novels are written by Midori Tateyama: the first is based on Heart no Kuni no Alice and was released in December 2008, and the second is based on Clover no Kuni no Alice and was published in June 2009. Three novels are written by Sana Shirakawa: two are based on Clover no Kuni no Alice and were released in February and March 2010, and the third is based on Joker no Kuni no Alice and was published in December 2010.

=== Anime ===
An original video animation anime adaptation was announced for release in November 2008, but QuinRose announced on its production blog that the release was delayed until further notice. An anime film adaptation titled Alice in the Country of Hearts: Wonderful Wonder World premiered in Japanese theaters on July 30, 2011. The film is produced by Asahi Production and directed by Hideaki Ōba.

== Reception ==
The Heart no Kuni no Alice manga was ranked 27th on the Tohan charts between January 13–19, 2009. The third volume of the manga was ranked 25th on the Tohan charts between June 8–14, 2009. Japanator's God Len comments on the "lots of kissing and/or yaoi-centric scenes because this one is made for a more female audience."

The first volume of Tokyopop's English translation of Alice in the Country of Hearts was part of The New York Times Manga Best Seller List for seven weeks before dropping off the charts, but re-entered a few weeks later for another two weeks on the chart; the volume peaked at No. 5. The first volume again re-entered the chart at No. 5 during the week of July 18–24, 2010. The second volume was on the charts for four weeks, peaking at No. 6, before falling out of the rankings. The third volume was eighth place in its first week, rose to seventh in its second week, but fell to tenth place in its third week, where it stayed for its fourth week.

Ed Sizemore enjoyed the "pretty-boy" artwork and enjoyed Alice's characterization, but felt that the rest of the cast's "psychotic" characterisation made it uncomfortable to read. Zack Davisson enjoyed the "suggestion that Alice is creating the fantasy world from her subconscious, and that the rules set are her own", and enjoyed the manga's treatment of the game's story. Carlo Santos thought that the manga could be read as a satire on reverse harems, but felt the first volume lacked plot. Reading the second volume, he felt the plot was still "aimless", but enjoyed the exploration of "non-canon" ideas about Wonderland, such as what happens to a Wonderland character after they die.

Yen Press' English release of volume one of Alice in the Country of Hearts: My Fanatic Rabbit stayed on The New York Times Manga Best Seller List for six weeks, debuting at No. 7, and rising to No. 3 before falling to No. 9.
