= Starry Sky =

Japanese media franchise

- Starry☆Sky
- Cover art for the Windows CD Starry Sky ~After Spring~
- Genre: Romance, slice-of-life
- Video game
- Developer: Windows, Nintendo 3DS; Honeybee (game company); PlayStation Portable; HuneX
- Publisher: Windows, Nintendo 3DS; Honeybee (game company); PlayStation Portable; Asgard (company)
- Genre: Role-playing video game, life simulation game, visual novel, otome game
- Platform: Windows, PlayStation Portable, PlayStation Vita, Nintendo 3DS
- Released: Windows: JP: March 27, 2008 (Spring); JP: June 26, 2008 (Summer); JP: September 25, 2008 (Autumn); JP: December 25, 2008 (Winter); PlayStation Portable: JP: June 24, 2009 (Spring); JP: September 30, 2009 (Summer); JP: December 22, 2009 (Autumn); JP: April 28, 2011 (Winter); Nintendo 3DS: JP: April 25, 2012 (Spring); JP: June 27, 2012 (Summer); JP: August 29, 2012 (Autumn); JP: October 31, 2012 (Winter); PlayStation Vita: JP: November 23, 2014 (Spring); JP: May 11, 2017 (Summer); JP: August 24, 2017 (Autumn); JP: November 30, 2017 (Winter)
- Anime television series
- Directed by: Kiyoko Sayama
- Written by: Makoto Nakamura
- Music by: Tomoki Kikuya
- Studio: Frontier Works; Studio Deen
- Original network: Animate
- Original run: December 23, 2008 – June 16, 2009
- Episodes: 26

Starry☆Sky (スターリースカイ, Sutārī Sukai) is a Japanese otome game series created and developed by software game company Honeybee and HuneX. Starry Sky is separated into four games, the first of which was released in 2008, with three love interests in each, for a total of twelve possible love interests across all four games. Starry Sky has released multiple Drama CDs, countless manga adaptations, and a 26-episode anime adaptation. In addition, sequels of the four original games were created for both Windows and PlayStation Portable in 2008–2009 and 2011 respectively.

== Gameplay ==
The player takes control of Tsukiko Yahisa, the heroine of the Starry☆Sky games. The plot of the game is told in visual novel format, where the decision of the player affects the relationships she has with potential love interests.

== Plot ==
Tsukiko Yahisa is the first female student to enroll at Seigetsu Academy, a former all-boys school that specializes in astronomy. She is closely watched over by her childhood friends, Kanata Nanami and Suzuya Tohzuki, who often protect her from the male student body. Throughout the game, she befriends other young men whose personalities are based on the Western zodiac constellations.

In the first game Starry☆Sky~in Spring~, shortly after Tsukiko transfers to Seigetsu Academy, a half-French boy named Yoh Tomoe pursues Tsukiko. This action stirs up emotions in Kanata and Suzuya, both of whom had long been in love with Tsukiko.

In the second game, Starry☆Sky~in Summer~, Tsukiko joins the academy's archery club. As she practices for the summer competition, she simultaneously solves the problems between her teammates (Homare Kanakubo, Ryunosuke Miyaji, and Azusa Kinose).

In the third game, Starry☆Sky~in Autumn~, Tsukiko becomes involved with three teachers at her school (Iku Mizushima, Naoshi Haruki, and Kotarou Hoshizuki).

The last game, Starry☆Sky~in Winter~, details Tsukiko's involvement with the student council, which includes Tsubasa Amaha, Kazuki Shiranui, and Hayato Aozora.

== Characters ==
Tsukiko Yahisa (夜久 月子 (ヤヒサ ツキコ), Yahisa Tsukiko) Voiced by: Fumiko Orikasa (anime)
Tsukiko is the heroine of the Starry☆Sky games. She is the first female student to attend Seigetsu Academy, a traditionally all-boys school, and is in her second year.

=== Spring ===
Yoh Tomoe (土萌 羊, Tomoe Yō) Voiced by: Hikaru Midorikawa
Yoh represents Capricorn. His French name is Henri Samuel Jean Aimée. He is half-French and was often teased for that as a kid. He met Tsukiko when he was young, and because she was the only person who didn't make fun of him for being half-French, he fell in love with her and asked his father to let him transfer to Seigetsu Academy in order to pursue her. Initially disdainful of everyone except Tsukiko, eventually, he learns the importance of having friends. His father hopes to work in America to develop a special astronomy project. He is in his second year at the school.
Kanata Nanami (七海 哉太, Nanami Kanata) Voiced by: Tomokazu Sugita
Kanata, also a student in his second year, represents Pisces. Brash and impulsive, he has been friends with Tsukiko since childhood and has developed feelings for her. He does not get along very well with Yoh. Kanata has a terminal illness that leaves him in a lethargic state, which is why he often skips classes and faints without reason. However, he refuses to seek medical help and often gets involved in school fights that worsen his health to protect Tsukiko.
Suzuya Tohzuki (東月 錫也, Tōzuki Suzuya) Voiced by: Daisuke Ono
Suzuya represents Cancer. Calm and friendly, he was friends with Tsukiko and Kanata since childhood and often watches out for them like an older brother. He is very good at cooking and often uses the school's kitchen to prepare food for his friends. Suzuya is also in love with Tsukiko, but because he knows that Kanata also loves her, he holds back. Beneath his warm exterior, Suzuya has a dark side and worries about Tsukiko constantly. He is in his second year as well.

=== Summer ===
Azusa Kinose (木ノ瀬 梓, Kinose Azusa) Voiced by: Jun Fukuyama
Azusa represents Sagittarius. Although he is a newcomer to the archery club, he has met Tsukiko before and inspired her to become better at it. He is a deadpan-like, cold, serious, introvert, plain, calm, quiet, and stoic with not too much to says, only just himself was can be a little bit more expressive and emotional. While he appears confident, even to the point of overt boasting, but he is actually quite insecure/uncomfortable and struggles to make a real effort to achieve his goals. He is revealed as a distant relatives of Tsubasa, whose more comical relief-like, optimistic, hyperactive, and mischievous personality (cheerful, energetic, extrovert, warm, gentle, laid-back), starkly contrasts with him. He has a emo-like yet "effeminate" (androgynous) appearance that becomes especially obvious, just when if he is between (around) other boys only. Azusa often flirts with Tsukiko, and his actions annoy Ryunosuke. He is a first year.
Homare Kanakubo (金久保 誉, Kanakubo Homare) Voiced by: Soichiro Hoshi
Homare represents Taurus. He is the captain of the archery club. He is openly friendly and often settles arguments between Ryunosuke and Azusa, but is prone to feel pressured for the success of the archery club. He is in his third year. His best friends are Shiranui Kazuki and Shirogane Oushirou from the same year.
Ryunosuke Miyaji (宮地 龍之介, Miyaji Ryūnosuke) Voiced by: Hiroshi Kamiya
Ryunosuke represents Scorpio. He is the sub-captain of the archery club. He appears to be serious and calm but hides a penchant for sweets. Ryunosuke has kept an eye out for Tsukiko ever since he first saw her. He is in his second year.

=== Autumn ===
Naoshi Haruki (陽日 直獅, Haruki Naoshi) Voiced by: Daisuke Kishio
Naoshi represents Leo. He is Tsukiko's homeroom teacher and the advisor for the archery club. He is energetic and enjoys the "youth" part of high school since he spent high school mostly studying, and because of that, a lot of students can't take him seriously and often play pranks on him. Naoshi's best friend, Hiroki, got him to enjoy high school, but Hiroki was hit by a car saving the girl he liked. Because of that, he was afraid to fall in love until he met Tsukiko.
Iku Mizushima (水嶋 郁, Mizushima Iku) Voiced by: Kouji Yusa
Iku represents Gemini. He is currently a student teacher and friends with the school nurse, Kotarou, since they were children. Iku and his twin sister Yui were both born with poor health, and Yui died while they were in high school. He was formerly the lead singer of a band the heroine liked but destroyed his voice while overworking himself due to the pain of his sister's death. His band members turned out to be using him for money and promptly dismissed him when he could no longer sing. Iku lost trust in everyone until a girl, Tsukiko, helped him gain it back.
Kotarou Hoshizuki (星月 琥太郎, Hoshizuki Kotarō) Voiced by: Akira Ishida
Kotarou represents Libra. He is the school nurse who once had ambitions to become a doctor. Iku's sister, Yui, had feelings for him, but after her death, Kotarou blamed himself for not being able to save her. His father is the chairman of the academy, but after his father's retirement, the position was given to Kotarou's sister, Koharu. However, he ended up obtaining the position due to Koharu's wish to work overseas.

=== Winter ===
Kazuki Shiranui (不知火 一樹, Shiranui Kazuki) Voiced by: Yuichi Nakamura
Kazuki represents Aries. He is the president of the student council. He is gifted with the power of foresight, although this ability does not allow him to see everything. He blames himself for the death of his parents because of his lack of understanding of his own power. Because of this, he hates his power. As a child, he was often involved in fights to prove his own strength. The day he met Tsukiko, she told him that only people who think they are weak try and show their strength through brute force. He had become friends with her, and Kanata and Suzuya as well. He is in his third year (apparently he repeated a year, together with Shirogane)
Tsubasa Amaha (天羽 翼, Amaha Tsubasa) Voiced by: Kenichi Suzumura
Tsubasa represents Aquarius. He is the treasurer of the student council. He often lights up the mood in the student council. However, he is emotionally unstable. At a very young age, he was abandoned by his parents, who got divorced. He was taken in by his grandparents on his mother's side. When Tsubasa was young, he spent a lot of time with his grandfather, and they often made inventions together. Even now, Tsubasa still likes to invent things. His grandfather's dying wish made Tsubasa promise to take care of his grandmother. His grandmother sent Tsubasa away to school, and ever since Tsubasa likes to be alone. He thinks that being alone is better than being with people because he is afraid of losing things that are important to him. He is a first year.
Hayato Aozora (青空 颯斗, Aozora Hayato) Voiced by: Daisuke Hirakawa
Hayato represents Virgo. He is the vice president of the student council. He comes from a well-known family of pianists but lacks self-confidence and feels pressured to be up to par with his family's talent. In the end, he decided to leave his house and stay in the school dorm. He is a second-year student.

=== Special character ===
Shiki Kagurazaka (神楽坂 四季, Kagurazaka Shiki) Voiced by: Mamoru Miyano
Represents Ophiuchus, the 13th constellation. This special "13th Character" was introduced in the 13th secret date CD. Not much information is given. His Greek name translates to "serpent-bearer" and he is often seen holding an albino snake in many official illustrations. In the fourth game Starry Sky in Winter it's mentioned that he has greater, stranger power than Kazuki Shiranui.

=== Minor characters ===
Idiot Trio (バカトリオ, baka torio) Voiced by: Tsubasa Yonaga (Koguma), Takashi Kondo (Shiratori), and Hiroyuki Yoshino (Inukai)
Shin'ya Koguma (小熊 伸也, Koguma Shin'ya), Yahiko Shiratori (白鳥 弥彦, Shiratori Yahiko), and Takafumi Inukai (犬飼 隆文, Inukai Takafumi) are members of the archery club and are dubbed as the "idiot trio".
Oushirou Shirogane (白銀 桜土郎, Shirogane Ōshirō) Voiced by: Junichi Suwabe
Oushirou is an acquaintance of Kazuki's and Homare's, he carries a camera everywhere due to being a journalist for the school paper. He is a third-year student.
Takatsugu Izumi (和泉 崇嗣, Izumi Takatsugu) Voiced by: Satoshi Hino
Izumi is a first-year student in the Mythology department who appears in the After Spring game. He has a serious and straightforward personality despite his devil-may-care appearance. He tends to act on his thoughts, does not think very deeply, and does not lie either. Despite coming from a yakuza background, he is a pacifist at heart and is weak at fighting.
Haru Oshinari (忍成 ハル, Oshinari Haru) Voiced by: Katsuyuki Konishi
Oshinari is a student teacher who appears in the After-Spring game. When he is free, he helps out at the dormitories.
Makoto Haruna (春名 真琴, Haruna Makoto) Voiced by: Mitsuki Saiga
The name of this character is changeable. Haruna appears in the After Spring, Summer, and Autumn games. She is a boyish character whom the protagonist relies on for advice.

=== Family ===
Raoul Mathias Jean Aimée (ラウル・マティアス・ジャン・エーメ, Rauru Matiasu Jan Ēme) Voiced by: Ryōtarō Okiayu
Yoh's father is French. He often teases Yoh for fun. Yoh's father has a cheerful personality. He tends to dote on his wife to the point that he sometimes forgets about Yoh's existence.
Tomoe Imari (土萌 未莉, Tomoe Imari) Voiced by: Fujimoto Noriko
Yoh's mother. She actually knows the protagonist's mother as they were classmates. She and her husband are still passionately in love.
Mayumi Nanami (七海 まゆみ, Nanami Mayumi) Voiced by: Katou Masami
Kanata's mother. Despite her coarse language, she is good at looking after others. After her husband's death, she raised Kanata by herself. Although she hits Kanata quite often, she pampers the protagonist and Suzuya, and thinks of them like her own children.
Sayuri Touzukii (東月 小百合, Tōzuki Sayuri) Voiced by: Okamoto Nami
Suzuya's mother. As the result of being the only housewife within the three families in After Spring, she is the one who looks after the children the longest. Her husband is a salaryman and is not shown in the game.

== Development ==
All character designs, covers, and background art were digitally painted by Kazuaki.

In 2011, JAST USA announced it was considering licensing the Starry Sky series for an English release.

== Media ==
=== Game ===
Starry☆Sky was separated into four games, each one taking place in a different season with three possible love interests, for the PC. The first game, Starry☆Sky~in Spring~, was released on March 27, 2008. The opening theme song was titled Starry Sky and was performed by Hikaru Midorikawa, the voice of Yoh Tomoe. Following its release, the second installment, Starry☆Sky~in Summer~ was released on June 26, 2008. The opening theme song was titled Shoot High and was performed by Hiroshi Kamiya, the voice of Ryunosuke Miyaji. The third game, Starry☆Sky~in Autumn~, was released on September 25, 2008, and its theme song was titled Lies, Truth, and Our Destiny performed by Daisuke Kishio, the voice of Naoshi Haruki. The last game, Starry☆Sky~in Winter~, was released on December 25, 2008, and the opening theme song was Grayed Out performed by Yuichi Nakamura, the voice of Kazuki Shiranui. Starting in 2009, all four games were ported onto the PlayStation Portable.

The original games were followed by a spin-off, which takes place between the epilogue and the original time of the game. Starry☆Sky~After Spring~ was the first of the spin-off games to be released on the PC.

=== CDs ===
The limited-edition versions of all the games were bundled with a CD with the full version of the opening theme and a separate drama CD featuring the male characters in the game. A full-length drama CD for the spring characters was released on August 28, 1999. In addition, a soundtrack for the game's music was released on September 25, 1999.

Throughout 1999, twelve date CDs were released monthly, starting with Yoh Tomoe (the Capricorn) on January 30, 1999, to Azusa Kinose (the Sagittarius) on December 25, 1999. The date CDs feature the voice actors for each of the twelve possible love interests in the game and simulate a date and a romance between the listener and the character. Each CD came with a special coupon. If the coupons from all twelve CDs were submitted to Honeybee at the end of the year, one would receive a secret date CD featuring a 13th character, Shiki Kagurazaka (voiced by Mamoru Miyano), who represents the Ophiuchus, the 13th constellation.

=== Manga ===
Short manga stories about the characters of each game have been collected into anthologies by DNA Media Comics. Starry☆Sky~in Spring~ Comic Anthology was released on October 24, 1996, and features all the characters from the spring game. Similarly, Starry☆Sky~in Summer~ Comic Anthology was released on December 25, 1996. A 4 volume manga based on the games was released in Comic B's-Log Kyun! between 2010 and 2013. Digital Manga Publishing partially released this manga series in English in North America.

=== Anime ===
An anime adaptation was distributed through Animate.tv's website and Sun TV. It was written by Makoto Nakamura and directed by Kiyoko Sayama.

There are 26 episodes lasting 11 minutes each. The first airing of the episodes was on Animate.tv in late December 2008. In February 2011, Sun TV started also simulcasting this series, airing two parts of episodes of this series as a whole episode (meaning 13 episodes by 22 minutes each). They are done in an episodic format, with each episode (or two parts of the episode) focusing on one character or subset of characters from the storyline.

No.	Title	Original release date
1	"So, I've Always Looked at the Sky Since Then, While I Think of You Far Away" "Dakara, Boku wa Are Kara Itsumo Sora o Nagameru. Tōku Hanareta Kimi o Omoinagara" (だから、僕はあれからいつも空を眺める。遠く離れた君を思いながら)	December 23, 2008
Episode Capricorn Part 1. Yoh meets Tsukiko as a small child when he drops his telescope. At present, he is no longer living in Japan. His father, an astronomer, is pitching a lecture series to an American college and plans to travel there with his wife and son. Yoh asks if, before the lecture circuit is approved, he can spend time back in Japan. His father realizes that this is about the girl Yoh had met long ago, granting him approval and support to find his own "first evening star." Yoh then transfers to a school focusing on astronomy where he quickly meets Tsukiko again, who is the only female student at the school
2	"Merci. Je t'aime"	December 30, 2008
Episode Capricorn Part 2. After a time skip of one month, Yoh is seen, having become friends (and rivals for Tsukiko's affections) with Kanata Nanami and Suzuya Tohzuki. He talks to his father on the phone, who tells him that the lecture circuit has been approved, and they will be going to America in a few weeks, where Yoh is expected to join them. Yoh is slightly saddened by the news but decides that his time in Japan has been well spent, kissing Tsukiko on the cheek, and playfully fighting with Kanata.
3	"I burn important moments deep into my eyes so I won't forget them" "Daijina Shunkan wa...Hitomi no Oku ni Gyutto Tojikomete Oku. Wasurenai Yōni......Tebanasanai Yōni" (大事な瞬間は…瞳の奥にぎゅっと閉じ込めておく。 忘れないように……手放さないように)	January 6, 2009
Episode Aquarius Part 1. Tsubasa, the "Aquarius," has a unique laugh that made him self-conscious when he was a boy. He was taken in by his grandpa when he was a child, but everyone around him always called him a nuisance, which left emotional scars. A skilled inventor, he has been making machines since a young age. When he arrives at school, he meets up with his cousin and gets forcibly drafted onto the Student Council by the eccentric President Kazuki. (Tsukiko is secretary), and pretty soon they become friends.
4	"I'm having fun. In this time we're all spending" "Ore wa Tanoshiinda. Minna de Sugosu, Kono Jikanga" (俺は楽しいんだ。みんなで過ごす、この時間が)	January 13, 2009
Episode Aquarius Part 2. Tsubasa is banned from inventing in the student council room after one of his inventions explodes. He is unhappy, and the tensions grow thicker when the other members of the student council decide to implement a lab in the student council room though Tsubasa is unaware of their surprise for him.
5	"I want to protect my important person, By my hand." "Mamoritakattanda. Kono te de, Daijina aitsu-ra o" (守りたかったんだ。この手で、大事なあいつらを)	January 20, 2009
Episode Pisces Part 1. This episode reflects on Kanata's past with Tsukiko & Suzuya. Kanata has always been friends with them since he was little. As he grows up with them he develops feelings for Tsukiko. He has always had a weak body and feels that he can not protect them. He continues to fight because it makes him feel alive and not weak. Tsukiko and Suzuya dislike it when he overdoes his fighting habits, even though they are unsure of his reason.
6	"I'll be by your side until you stop crying." "Naki Yamu Made, Soba Niite Yaruyo" (泣きやむまで、そばにいてやるよ)	January 27, 2009
Episode Pisces Part 2. Kanata reflects on Tsukiko and how she never lets anyone see her struggles. He and Suzuya vow to always be by her side and to protect her because that's all they can do. It is revealed that Kanata's greatest wish is that others will see him as a "natural person."
7	"Everyone around me was being sad??" "Jibun ni Chikazuku Mono wa, Fukō ni Naru??" (自分に近づく者は、不幸になる??)	February 3, 2009
Episode Aries Part 1. Kazuki's life is shown in a flashback and the discovery of his power to see the future is revealed. Due to his unawareness of his powers, Kazuki blamed himself terribly for the loss of his parents. Ostracized by others and feeling as though hiding his weakness would make him strong, Kazuki was all alone until he met Tsukiko who taught him that only cowards hide their weakness and use brute force to fight. It is revealed that Kazuki became friends with not only Tsukiko but Kanata and Suzuya as well when they were younger but when separated due to an incident with Tsukiko, those times became only memories of the past though Kazuki always promised he would remember Tsukiko even if she forgot about him.
8	"Yes, It's what I want to Protect." "Sō, Kore Gaore no Mamoritai Mono" (そう、これが俺の守りたいもの)	February 10, 2009
Episode Aries Part 2. Kazuki has a vision of his future in that he has become the president of the school and has made friends who care for him. Kazuki wishes for this vision to be true and starts believing that his powers can actually be good thus he sets off to make that vision a reality. As his vision starts coming true, Kazuki constantly puts himself in danger because he hopes to protect others through his power even if he gets hurt but Homare and Oushirou teach him that he is just as important.
9	"――I'm Vulnerable to Pressure" "――Bokuwa, Puresshā ni Yowai" (――僕は、プレッシャーに弱い)	February 17, 2009
Episode Taurus Part 1. It begins with Homare and Kazuki in the office of the student council drinking tea and talking about how they are going to graduate that year, later Oushirou appears and joins them. After that, it shows Homare in his first year practicing archery but having bad results because of the pressure. He was about to quit but Kazuki appeared and cheered him up.
10	"Pull the Bow for Yourself" "Yumiwa, Jibun no Tame ni Kiku Mono" (弓は、自分のために引くもの)	February 24, 2009
Episode Taurus Part 2. Again in the student council room, it is Kazuki, Homare, and Oushirou talking about how Tsukiko is doing in the archery club, then a flashback begins showing when Tsukiko entered the club and how hard-working she is. After a hard day, she falls asleep and Homare finds her. When she wakes up, he tells her that she shouldn´t force herself so much causing Tsukiko to start to crying. She then confesses to him that she was feeling bad because she was being treated differently due to her gender. This made Homare realize that she was really trying to improve herself resulting in him consoling her. There ends the flashback. After reminiscing about the past, the three leave the student council room to look for Tsukiko. The end of the episode shows Homare, Azusa, and Tsukiko showing up late at the archery room and Miyaji scolding Azusa.
11	"The pure and beautiful…I want to hurt them" "Junsuide Kirei na Mono Hodo......Yogoshitaku Narunda" (純粋で綺麗(きれい)な物ほど……汚したくなるんだ)	March 3, 2009
Episode Gemini Part 1. It starts off in the past when Kotarou first asks Iku to become a teacher at his school. Once there he meets Tsukiko for the first time and it shocks him that he sees a resemblance between her and his sister Yui. Iku then reminisces on his childhood with Kotarou and how neither of them can get over the loss of Yui.
12	"I thought meeting her was nothing more than an ordinary encounter" "Arifureta Deai no Hitotsu ni Suginaito - Sō Omotte Itanda" (ありふれた出会いの一つに過ぎないと――そう思っていたんだ)	March 10, 2009
Episode Gemini Part 2. Iku continues to reminisce on his past with Kotarou and Yui. Yui's illness was too much for her and the doctors were unable to cure her thus she dies. Devastated and torn apart, Iku cannot get over the loss and turns into a completely different person unable to care, nor trust anyone after he loses his ability to sing and finds out he is being used by his band members. Now in the present, Iku proposes he play a game with Tsukiko. They pretend to be lovers and the one who falls in love first loses. Tsukiko decides to play and Iku thinks about how he will never trust anyone again for the only one he loved and cared for was his other half, Yui.
13	"To Me, There is Something I want to Protect――" "Ore niwa, Mamoritai Mono ga Aru――" (俺には、守りたいものがある――)	March 17, 2009
Episode Cancer Part 1. Suzuya reflects on his past with his childhood friends Tsukiko and Kanata and how he had always wanted to protect them ever since they were young. Suzuya always took care of Tsukiko and Kanata thus making him the "mother" of the two. Wanting to be able to do something for them, he worked hard to be able to cook well and so forth. He meets Kazuki Shiranui who is friends with Kanata and Tsukiko. Eventually, the four friends become part of an inseparable group. That is until an incident involving Kazuki and Tsukiko separates them and Tsukiko loses her memory of Kazuki. In more present day, when the three first move into high school they meet up with Kazuki again though Suzuya still can't forgive what he did in the past.
14	"Just Staying By Your Side Is Enough, That's What I Thought" "Tonari ni Irareru Dakede Yoi. Sō Omottetakedo――" (隣にいられるだけで良い。そう思ってたけど――)	March 24, 2009
Episode Cancer Part 2. Suzuya had always hoped for him, Kanata, and Tsukiko to be together but he realizes that it is not possible for little by little, his surroundings are changing and they are affecting those he cherishes the most. He notices the biggest change in Tsukiko and he is afraid that once she finds her prince charming he will not be able to be happy for her. Suzuya then states that Tsukiko is the most important to him now and even in the future so he will always be there for her to guard her smile. Even though he loves her tremendously and wants to be with her for eternity, he knows his wish could never be fulfilled.
15	"I Love This Job" "Kono Shigoto ga, Ore wa Daisukida" (この仕事が、オレは大好きだ)	March 31, 2009
Episode Leo Part 1. It begins in the past when Naoshi, the "Leo", first becomes a teacher in the academy whose hopeful wish is to have his students know the excitement and enjoyment of their school lives. After a year of being in the academy, Naoshi has become quite popular and is loved by all his students who even tease and sometimes prank him though Iku questions his closeness and relationship with the latter. The students then begin to prepare for an upcoming cultural festival.
16	"Until That Day, I Always Thought Youth Was Worthless" "Ano Himade, Seishun Nante Zutto Kudaranai to Omotsu Teta" (あの日まで、青春なんてずっとくだらないと思ってた)	April 7, 2009
Episode Leo Part 2. The students have finally finished the preparations necessary for the cultural festival to commence and so Naoshi treats them all to lunch. Trouble soon arrives when a storm hits and they forget to close the window where they had left their preparations. They all rush to the classroom and the students find all their things in ruin. They become dismayed, losing hope and thinking it will be impossible to fix everything but Naoshi stands firm and encourages the students that nothing is impossible because they are his students. With their spirits revived and with the help of a few others, the class worked hard to make the festival the most memorable one.
17	"That Time, My Life Has Greatly Begun to Change" "Boku no Jinsei ga Ōkiku Kawari Hajimeta no Wa, Anotoki" (僕の人生が大きく変わり始めたのは、あのとき)	April 14, 2009
Episode Virgo Part 1. Being the son of a family of pianists, it was expected that Hayato Aozora would continue the legacy and become a pianist himself. Even so, he was overshadowed by his more talented older brother and sister and soon felt that he could never play the piano as well as them. It was then that he began to feel unwanted as if he did not belong in that house anymore and thus decided to enroll at Seigetsu Academy. It was here where he first met Kazuki Shiranui, the student council president, and slowly he began to realize that his life had begun to change.
18	"If I Know The Happiness Of Being Called By My Name, I Can't Bear The Sadness Of Not Being Called" "Namae o Yoba Reru Ureshisa o Shitte Shimattara, Yoba Renai Kanashimi ni wa, Mōtae Raresō ni nai" (名前を呼ばれる嬉しさを知ってしまったら、呼ばれない悲しみには、もう耐えられそうにない)	April 21, 2009
Episode Virgo Part 2. It has been over a year and a half since Kazuki first invited Hayato to join the student council and he has become close friends with the other two members as well: Tsubasa and Tsukiko. It is thanks to the student council that Hayato's boring and uncolorful life has begun to shine and he has begun to be more open with others. The feelings of happiness he had long forgotten began to come back as he finally showed a genuine smile in gratitude to the student council members for wanting to celebrate his birthday, something his parents never did back home.
19	"No Matter How Painful a Memory is, It is a Treasure to Me" "Donna Tsurai Kioku de mo, Ore Nitotte wa Hōmotsuna nda" (どんな辛い記憶でも、俺にとっては宝物なんだ)	April 28, 2009
Episode Libra Part 1. It begins when Tsukiko enters the nurse's office and finds Kotarou Hoshizuki, the school doctor, sleeping lazily on one of the patient beds. Kotarou then takes over and reminisces about a past memory that has brought him both great joy but also terrible sadness: his first meeting with the twins Iku and Yui Mizushima. Before meeting Iku and Yui, Kotarou lived a monotone life and didn't really look towards his future. It was at that point in time that his older sister introduced him to Iku and Yui and he began to develop a very close relationship with the two. Even so, Yui had a terrible heart condition and Kotarou knew her life was limited. Having become so close to the two he set his heart to do something for them thus his wanting to study and become a doctor to save Yui's life.
20	"The More Precious a Certain Time is For Me, The More It Slips Away From Me" "Itoshii to Omou Jikan Hodo, Ore wa Wshinatte iku" (愛おしいと思う時間ほど、俺は失っていく)	May 5, 2009
Episode Libra Part 2. Kotarou has been working hard to study and find a cure that could heal Yui's illness. He begins to think it is thanks to them that he found a treasure important enough for him to care for. Yui, however, falls in love with Kotarou and she lets him know of her feelings but Kotarou, even though he sees her as the girl most important in his life, knows his love for her is that of a love for a younger sister and thus he decides to let the confession slide to try and not ruin the relation he has with the twins. Due to that, he delayed his response and before he knew it, Yui had died. Now in the present time, Kotarou still feels as though he has no right to love and that whoever falls in love with him will be sad thus he feels as though that which becomes precious to him will soon disappear.
21	"I Want to Meet a Hard-Working Specialist" "Ore wa, Doryoku no Supesharisutodearitai" (俺は、努力のスペシャリストでありたい)	May 12, 2009
Episode Scorpio Part 1. Miyaji Ryuunosuke, the Scorpio, has recently joined the archery club along with Inukai and Tsukiko. In the past he was good at sports, especially soccer, and worked hard every day in order to improve himself, but one time after he lost a game he realized that one could not win through just their own efforts, but through the efforts of everyone on the team. Realizing his team would not pull through, he decided to quit soccer altogether to try a sport that was only based on an individual's hard work and talent so as not to have to rely on others much. Even so, he slowly began to realize that his circle of friends began to grow with every new member as well as his trust in his teammates.
22	"I Did Not Know the Pleasure of Doing Something This Way with Friends. The Joy of Working Together..." "Ore wa Shiranakatta. Kō Yatte Nakama to Nani ka o Kyōyū Suru Yorokobi. Tomoni Doryoku Suru Tanoshi-sa o..." (オレは知らなかった。こうやって仲間と何かを共有する喜び。共に努力する楽しさを…)	May 19, 2009
Episode Scorpio Part 2. Everyone has been working hard in the archery club in order to aim for the Inter-High competition. Miyaji has also grown from being a person who could not count on others to a real team player and his bonds with his friends have grown stronger. Even though some of the upperclassmen began to doubt that they could win, Miyaji stepped in to say that those who ran away would never reach their goals. Thanks to him everyone gains their confidence back and they all work extra hard for the competition. Though the results are not what they expected Kanakubo tells them they just have to work harder for next year's competition. It is then that time passes and new members including first-year Azusa Kinose begin to arrive. Miyaji has a talk with Tsukiko after their second competition and begins to think of how soon his rivalry with her will turn into love.
23	"Something Like Being a Genius Doesn't Matter to Me" "Tensai Toka, Sonna no wa dō demoii" (天才とか、そんなのはどうでもいい)	May 26, 2009
Episode Sagittarius Part 1. Azusa Kinose, a once skilled archer, decides that he no longer wants to do Japanese archery. It is then that his master tells him that he has been living a colorless life because even though he can do anything which makes him a genius he still lacks something important and Azusa questions himself whether he will change. Even though everyone around him considers him a genius, he himself does not think that way and can only think of how his world is black and white while everything else is colorful, it is then that he moves to Seigetsu Academy and is reunited with his childhood friend Tsubasa Amaha hoping that this school will give him something he couldn't have before.
24	"I Didn't Know Something Like a Strongly Shining Color Exists" "Boku wa Shiranakatta. Konnani Tsuyoku Kagayaku iro ga aru toyuu koto o" (僕は知らなかった。 こんなに強く輝く色があるというコトを)	June 2, 2009
Episode Sagittarius Part 2. Naoshi Haruki has been relentlessly pursuing Azusa to have him join the archery club and after much persistence, Azusa decides to make a deal with him, he will go and observe the practices under the condition that Naoshi finds what it is that Tsubasa never wears. Naoshi manages to find out what Tsubasa never wears and Azusa admits defeat therefore having to go and observe the practice. It is there that he meets Tsukiko and watches her form in archery. He comments saying that watching her was like seeing a new color in his world that never existed before thus deciding to join the archery club much to Miyaji's annoyance.
25	"The Future has Stopped. Fate was Invisible to the Future" "Mirai ga Tomatta. Unmei ga Mirai o Mienaku sa Seta" (未来が止まった。 運命が未来を見えなくさせた)	June 9, 2009
Episode Ophiuchus Part 1.
26	"The Variety of Seasons are Over" "Kisetsu wa Meguru. Samazamana Omoi o Nosete" (季節は巡る。 様々な思いをのせて)	June 16, 2009
Episode Ophiuchus Part 2.

== Reception ==
The game was well-received upon its release in Japan. The Spring game was featured in magazines such as Dengeki Girls'Style.
