= QuinRose =

Japanese video game developer

- Company type: Game and novel development and production enterprise
- Industry: Visual novel games development and production
- Founded: 2005
- Headquarters: Japan
- Website: quinrose.com

QuinRose (クインロゼ, Kuinroze) is a Japanese games developer specialising in otome games for Windows and consoles such as the PlayStation Portable. The company also produces drama CDs, manga, light novels, and other merchandise based on their games.

On September 25, 2015, Quinrose's parent company Artmove officially suspended business. Alleged reasons were the decline in sales due to the growing competitiveness in the marketplace, the growth of mobile games, and other factors. All games produced by Quinrose have ceased distribution since its business suspension.

== Games ==
QuinRose has developed and produced the following:

- Arabians Lost: The Engagement on Desert
  - Arabians Doubt: The Engagement on Desert
- Mother Goose no Himitsu no Yakata
  - Mother Goose no Himitsu no Yakata ~Blue Label~ (remake with male protagonist)
- Mahoutsukai to Goshujin-sama ~wizard and the master~
  - Mahoutsukai to Goshujin-sama ~wizard and the master~ New Ground(Remake with new artwork and fixed system)
- Heart no Kuni no Alice ~Wonderful Wonder World~
  - Diamond no Kuni no Alice ~Wonderful Wonder World~
    - Diamond no Kuni no Alice ~Wonderful Mirror World~
  - Heart no Kuni no Alice ~Wonderful Wonder World~
  - Joker no Kuni no Alice ~Wonderful Wonder World~ (side story)
  - Clover no Kuni no Alice ~Wonderful Wonder World~
  - Omochabako no Kuni no Alice ~Wonderful Wonder World~ (fandisc)
  - Heart no Kuni no Alice ~Wonderful Twin World~ (fandisc)
  - Anniversary no Kuni no Alice ~Wonderful Wonder World~ (remake of the original game)
- Crimson Empire ~Circumstances to Serve a Noble~
  - Crimson Royale ~Circumstances to Serve a Noble~
- Okashi na Shima no Peter Pan ~Sweet Never Land~
- 12 Ji no Kane to Cinderella ~Halloween Wedding~
  - 24 Ji no Kane to Cinderella ~Halloween Wedding~
  - 0 Ji no Kane to Cinderella ~Halloween Wedding~
- Kaidan Romance series
  - Oumagatoki ~Kaidan Romance~
    - Tasogaredoki ~Kaidan Romance~
  - Hyakki Yakou ~Kaidan Romance~
    - Hyaku Monogatari ~Kaidan Romance~
  - Shinigami Kagyou ~Kaidan Romance~
    - Shinigami Shogyou ~Kaidan Romance~
- Grimm the Bounty Hunter
- School Wars
  - School Wars ~Sotsugyou Sensen~
- Romeo VS Juliet
  - Romeo & Juliet
- Taishou Kitan
  - Taishou Kitan ~Kotonoha Sakuya~
- Kuroyuki Hime ~Snow Black~
  - Kuroyuki Hime ~Snow Magic~
- Satomi Hakkenden
  - Satomi Hakkenden Hamami Hime no Ki
  - Satomi Hakkenden Murasamemaru no Ki
- Black Code
- Majo'ou
- Mermaid Gothic
- Genji Koi Emaki

=== PSP Port of Other Companies' Games ===
- Iza, Shutsujin! Koi ikusa (originally an iOS game)
  - Iza, Shutsujin! Koi ikusa Dainimaku
- Asaki, Yumemishi (originally a PC game by MIO)
- Abunai Koi no Souhashitsu (originally an iOS game)
