= IndieBox =

- Type: Distributor
- Industry: Video games

IndieBox was a monthly independent video games (indie game) subscription box service. The company worked directly with indie game developers to design and manufacture boxed collector's edition releases of games that are typically only available in digital form. The company started operations in May 2014. Each monthly box included a digital rights management-free (DRM-free) game disc (or custom-designed rewritable USB-stick for most boxes released before July 2016), Steam key, full-color printed instruction game manual, game soundtrack CD, sticker, and an exclusive collectible, such as a plushy or action figure of a notable character from that game. All games were packaged in a physical game box similar to software titles in the 1980s and 1990s.

IndieBox was founded by John Carter, Jason Blank, and James Morgan, who were assisted by various teams of volunteers to help with design, packaging, and shipping. They formed the company to create a Book of the Month Club-type service for independent video games; subscribers would not necessarily know what game they were getting, but the company's curation process would assure they would be getting a game with a strong reputation. When they started, they had to cold call several developers to gain interest, eventually signing on Rain Games to use their game Teslagrad as the first IndieBox title.

In October 2016, IndieBox partnered with GameStop to release a limited set of steelbook-case packages for ten titles, half of which had already previously received a collector's edition through IndieBox's service, to be retailed in the GameStop stores under the name "GameTrust Collection", based on GameStop's GameTrust publishing arm.

In October 2017, IndieBox announced it was closing down its subscription product; the company cited that the market for physical box releases was not as large as they had anticipated to cover all costs of preparing the boxes for subscribers. After completing its final box and handling existing accounts, the company transitioned to helping support online marketplace features for indie developers.

Past IndieBoxes:

Torchlight II	September 2017
Invisible, Inc.	August 2017
The Banner Saga	July 2017
Hollow Knight	June 2017
Nefarious	May 2017
Super Meat Boy: Dr. Fetus Edition	April 2017
Typoman: Revised	March 2017
Wasteland 2	February 2017
Hue	January 2017
Forced: Showdown	December 2016
Halcyon 6	November 2016
Jotun	October 2016
Rive	September 2016
The Stanley Parable	August 2016
Hand of Fate	July 2016
Moon Hunters	June 2016
Dust: An Elysian Tail	May 2016
Galak-Z	April 2016
Assault Android Cactus	March 2016
Lovers in a Dangerous Spacetime	February 2016
Nuclear Throne	January 2016
Armello	December 2015
Freedom Planet	November 2015
Axiom Verge	October 2015
TowerFall	September 2015
Apotheon	August 2015
Guacamelee!	July 2015
Captain Forever Remix	June 2015
Dyscourse	May 2015
Lovely Planet	April 2015
The Next Penelope	March 2015
Risk of Rain	February 2015
Super Win the Game	January 2015
Rogue Legacy	December 2014
SteamWorld Dig	November 2014
Brütal Legend	October 2014
Luftrausers	September 2014
MouseCraft	August 2014
Forced	July 2014
Escape Goat 2	June 2014
Teslagrad	May 2014
