= Intel Level Up =

Intel Level Up Game Developer Contest
- Country: United States
- Formerly called: Intel Game Demo Contest
- Status: Inactive
- First award: 2006
- Final award: 2017

The Intel Level Up was a series of annual video game competitions organised by Intel to support independent video game development, with winning games receiving monetary rewards in addition to the award. The first competition, titled the Intel Game Demo Contest, was held in 2006. It was restarted in 2009 as the Intel Level Up Game Developer Contest. The competition has not been held after 2017.

A distinctive feature of the contest was the participation of game-industry luminaries as judges. At different times, the judges were Sid Meier, Will Wright, Chris Avellone, Todd Howard, Tim Schafer, Chris Taylor, etc.

== Winners ==
=== 2006 ===
Award	Category	Winner	Developer	Notes
Best Threaded Game	1st Place	Command: Operation Winter Storm	Koios Works	
Best Threaded Game	2nd Place	Gun Dragon	Avocado Overboard	
Best Threaded Game	3rd Place	Tiki Lounge Blackjack	The Jelly Filled Games	
Best Threaded Game	Honorable Mention	Insanipaint		
Best Threaded Game	Honorable Mention	El Condor Pasa	Sweet Mobility	
Best Game on the Go	1st Place	Toblo	Steve Chiavelli, John Jensen, Brad Rasmussen, Ben Smith, Zach Peterson	DigiPen
Best Game on the Go	2nd Place	Insanipaint		

=== 2007 ===
Award	Category	Winner	Developer	Notes
Best Threaded Game	1st Place	Harmotion	Erik Chan	Bottomless Pit Games
Best Threaded Game	2nd Place	Burning Tires	Rasmus Barringer	
Best Threaded Game	3rd Place	AntiPlanet	Lev Dymchenko	
Best Threaded Game	4th Place	Synaesthete	Zach Aikman, Andy Maneri, Will Towns, Joe Tkach	DigiPen
Best Threaded Game	5th Place	Red Assault	Andreas Papathanasis	
Best Game on the Go	1st Place	Penguins Arena	Cristophe Canon	Frogames
Best Game on the Go	2nd Place	Empyreal Nocturne	Reed Gonsalves, Chad Taylor	Double Hawk Games
Best Game on the Go	3rd Place	Hexaxis XXI	Tim Hackett	
Best Game on the Go	4th Place	Othello³	Alain Labrie	Ware-Wolf Games
Best Game on the Go	5th Place	Helicomaster	Jean-Philippe Doiron, Simon Ampleman	

=== 2008 ===
Award	Category	Winner	Developer	Notes
Best Threaded Game	1st Place	Goo!	Tommy Refenes	Pillowfort Games
Best Threaded Game	2nd Place	Xenus II: White Gold	Sergey Zabaryansky	Deep Shadows
Best Threaded Game	3rd Place	Winding Trail	Elena Sagalaeva	
Best Threaded Game	4th Place	Predtechi	Sergey Zabaryansky	Deep Shadows
Best Threaded Game	5th Place	Deadly Light	Yakov Sumygin	
Best Game on the Go	1st Place	Magic Worlds	Dmitry Dobryak	
Best Game on the Go	2nd Place	I’m Lulu King!	Cheng Chen	
Best Game on the Go	3rd Place	Sub0	Bradley Wesson	
Best Game on the Go	4th Place	Army of Earth	Tom Spencer-Smith	
Best Game on the Go	5th Place	Protozoa	Mauro Persano	
Best Game on Intel Graphics	1st Place	Pixel and Vega in: Crunch Time!	Aaron Murray	Tandem Games
Best Game on Intel Graphics	2nd Place	Protozoa	Mauro Persano	
Best Game on Intel Graphics	3rd Place	Goo!	Tommy Refenes	Pillowfort Games
Best Game on Intel Graphics	4th Place	Winding Trail	Elena Sagalaeva	
Best Game on Intel Graphics	5th Place	Army of Earth	Tom Spencer-Smith	
Judge's Choice	1st Place	Deadly Light	Yakov Sumygin	
Judge's Choice	2nd Place	Lens Flare Programming using 3D plains instead of sprites	Alip Kumar Saha	
Judge's Choice	3rd Place	Army of Earth	Tom Spencer-Smith	

=== 2009 ===
Judges: Sid Meier, Will Wright, Rick Raymo, Brad Wardell, Christophe Canon, Mathieu Mazerolle, Mary Beth Haggerty, Dmitry Oganezov, Gina Bovara, Jeff LaFlam, Brad Werth, Steve Winburn.

Award	Category	Winner	Developer
Judges' Choice		Rise of Flight: The First Great Air War	Albert Zhiltsov
Best Game Optimized For Intel Graphics	1st Place	I Know Your Deeds	Yakov Sumygin
Best Game Optimized For Intel Graphics	2nd Place	Spin Tires	Pavel Zagrebelnyy
Best Game Optimized For Intel Graphics	3rd Place	Infersus	Infersus
Best Threaded Game	1st Place	Infersus	Infersus
Best Threaded Game	2nd Place	I Know Your Deeds	Yakov Sumygin
Best Threaded Game	3rd Place	The Ray Tracing Game	Eugene Klyuchnikov
Best Game on the Go	1st Place	Spin Tires	Pavel Zagrebelnyy
Best Game on the Go	2nd Place	Germination	Bradley Wesson
Best Game on the Go	3rd Place	Rise Of Pirates	Stefans Keiss

=== 2010 ===
Judges: Chris Avellone, Vic Davis, Todd Hollenshead, Todd Howard, Rod Humble, Raph Koster, Rick Raymo, Bill Roper, Tim Schafer, Adam Sessler, Jeff Vogel.

Award	Category	Winner
Best Game on a Laptop	1st Place	Purple
Best Game on a Laptop	2nd Place	Icebreakers
Best Game on a Laptop	3rd Place	Car Washer: Summer Of The Ninja
Best Game on a Laptop	Honorable Mention	Billichess
Best Game on a Laptop	Honorable Mention	Gladius
Best Game on a Desktop		Have Time Will Travel
Best Game on a Netbook	1st Place	Cycle
Best Game on a Netbook	2nd Place	Mechanism III
Best Game on a Netbook	3rd Place	Karttoon Rally
Best Game on a Netbook	Honorable Mention	Bullzeye
Best Game on a Netbook	Honorable Mention	Heliride
Best Game on a Netbook	Honorable Mention	Spellbinder
Judges Choice	Best Art Design	Mechanism III
Judges Choice	Best Character Design	Icebreakers
Judges Choice	Best Graphics Performance	Purple
Judges Choice	Best Sound Design	Have Time Will Travel

=== 2011 ===
Judges: Andy Schatz, Jeff Vogel, Wolfgang Engel, Chris Taylor, Jim Rossignol.

Award	Category	Winner	Developer
Game of the Year		Blackwell's Asylum	Blackpipe
Best Adventure/Role Playing		Blackwell's Asylum	Blackpipe
Student Game Of The Year		The White Laboratory	Tao Xin
Best Strategy Game		The White Laboratory	Tao Xin
Best Casual Game		Divo	Logic Droids
Best Educational Game		Atooms To Moolecules	Bitsits Games
Best Puzzle Game		Splice	Cipher Prime Studios
Best Shooter Game		MilitAnt	Xibalba Studios
Best Simulation Game		Imagine Earth	Serious Brothers
Best Strategy Game (tie)		Plutonic Repulse: A Tale Of Limerence	Blackcow Studios
Judges Choice	Best 3D	Thunderwheels	G-Boot Games
Judges Choice	Best Physics	Thunderwheels	G-Boot Games
Judges Choice	Best Art	Beatbuddy	Threaks
Judges Choice	Best Sound	Beatbuddy	Threaks
Judges Choice	Best Character	Trash TV	Lawrence Russell

=== 2013 ===
Judges: Andy Schatz, Wolfgang Engel, Rami Ismail, Jordan Weisman.

Award	Category	Winner	Developer
Game of the Year		Perfection.	Dumb and Fat Games
Best Puzzle/Physics Game		Perfection.	Dumb and Fat Games
Best Adventure/Role Playing		Lilly Looking Through	Geeta Games
Best Action Game		Assault Android Cactus	Witch Beam
Best Platformer Game		Protocell	Team Primordia
Best “Other” Game		Cube & Star: A Love Story	Doppler Interactive
Skill and Craft	Best Art Design	Lilly Looking Through	Geeta Games
Skill and Craft	Best Game Physics	Torquel	FullPowerSlideAttack.com
Skill and Craft	Best Sound	Beatblasters III	Chainsawesome Games
Skill and Craft	Best Character Design	Life Goes On	Infinite Monkeys
Skill and Craft	Best 3D Graphics	Forced	BetaDwarf Entertainment

=== 2014 ===
Judges: Chris Avellone, Wolfgang Engel, Rami Ismail, Marc Saltzman, Tim Schafer, Chris Taylor, Nathan Vella, Tyrone Rodriguez.

Award	Category	Winner	Developer
Game of the Year		Duet	Kumobius and Tim Shiel
Best Action Game		Duet	Kumobius and Tim Shiel
Best Adventure/Role Playing		Bravada	Interbellum Team
Best Platformer Game		Biglands: A Game Made By Kids	Diego Acevedo
Best Puzzle Game		Framed	Loveshack
Best “Other” Game		OTTTD	Smg Studio
Skill and Craft	Best Art Design	Toast Time	Force Of Habit
Skill and Craft	Best Use Of Game Physics	Airscape: The Fall Of Gravity	Cross-product
Skill and Craft	Best Sound	Duet	Kumobius and Tim Shiel
Skill and Craft	Best Character Design	A Good Snowman Is Hard To Build	Alan Hazelden, Benjamin Davis, Ryan Roth
Skill and Craft	Best 3D Graphics	Forced 2: The Rush!	BetaDwarf Entertainment

=== 2015 ===
Judges: Chris Avellone, Kate Edwards, Wolfgang Engel, Rami Ismail, Tim Schafer, Chris Taylor, Tyrone Rodriguez.

Award	Category	Winner	Developer
Game of the Year		The Franz Kafka Videogame	Denis Galanin
Best Adventure/Role Playing		The Franz Kafka Videogame	Denis Galanin
Best Action Game		Synchrom	Morphiks
Best Linux Game		Spacejacked	Rotten Mage
Best Platformer Game		Bean Dreams	Kumobius
Best Puzzle Game		Tumblestone	The Quantum Astrophysicists Guild
Best “Other” Game		Galactic Missile Defense	Blacksheep Games
Skill and Craft	Best Art Design	Karma, Incarnation 1	AuraLab
Skill and Craft	Best Sound	Karma, Incarnation 1	AuraLab
Skill and Craft	Best 3D Graphics	Steamfarer	Igor Rashkuev
Skill and Craft	Best Character Design	Bulb Boy	Bulb Boy Team
Skill and Craft	Best Game Physics	Super Adventure Pals 2	Massive Monster

=== 2016 ===
Judges: Chris Avellone, Kate Edwards, Wolfgang Engel, Rami Ismail, Tim Schafer, Tyrone Rodriguez, Anne Toole.

Award	Category	Winner	Developer
Game of the Year		Ellipsis	Salmi Games
Best Action Game		Ellipsis	Salmi Games
Best Adventure/Role Playing		Elsinore	Golden Glitch Studios
Best Platformer Game		Little Bug	Buddy System
Best Puzzle Game		She Remembered Caterpillars	Jumpsuit Entertainment Ug (haftungsbeschränkt)
Best “Other” Game		Duskers	Misfits Attic
Skill and Craft	Best Art Design	Overland	Finji
Skill and Craft	Best 3D Graphics	Guns Of Icarus Alliance	Muse Games
Skill and Craft	Best Character Design	Tooth and Tail	Pocketwatch Games
Skill and Craft	Best Game Physics	Goatpunks	Studio Canvas
Skill and Craft	Best Sound	Animated Puzzles Star	Mexond Games

=== 2017 ===
Judges: Chris Avellone, Kate Edwards, Wolfgang Engel, Rami Ismail, Tim Schafer, Gary Rowe, Tyrone Rodriguez, Laila Shabir.

Award	Category	Winner	Developer
Game of the Year		Resynth	Polyphonic LP
Best Puzzle/Physics Game		Resynth	Polyphonic LP
Best Adventure/Role Playing		Cat Quest	The Gentelbros
Best Platformer Game		Pepper Grinder	Riv Hester
Best Action Game		Megaton Rainfall	Pentadimensional Games
Best Open-Genre Game		Paperbark	Paperhouse Games
Skill and Craft	Best Art Design	Cat Quest	The Gentelbros
Skill and Craft	Best 3D Graphics	Stardrop	Joure Visser
Skill and Craft	Best Character Design	The Adventure Pals	Massive Monster
Skill and Craft	Best Game Physics	Pepper Grinder	Riv Hester
Skill and Craft	Best Sound	Yankai’s Peak	Kenny Sun

== See also ==
- Indie Game Challenge
