= Aztez =

2017 video game

- Developer: Team Colorblind
- Engine: Unity
- Platforms: Microsoft Windows macOS; Linux
- Release: August 1, 2017
- Genres: Brawler, hack and slash, turn-based strategy
- Mode: Single-player

Aztez is a side-scrolling brawler, turn-based strategy video game by Team Colorblind. The player fights through areas within the Aztec empire prior to the Spanish invasion. Aztez was released on August 1, 2017, for Microsoft Windows, macOS, and Linux.

== Gameplay ==
Aztez is a side-scrolling brawler, turn-based strategy game. Set 20 years prior to the Spanish invasion, the player fights in areas based on places in the Aztec empire. Player weapons include a sword, spear, knife, and club. The game uses a grayscale and blood red color palette similar to that of 2010 action game MadWorld.

== Development ==
Aztez was developed by Team Colorblind, an indie game developer based in Phoenix, Arizona. The studio consisted of a two-person team: Ben Ruiz (artist and designer) and Matthew Wegner. They designed the game to feel like an arcade game, with minimal tutorials, which they felt to be important towards their goal of "empowering people to feel like a badass". They wanted to make the title have the action of God of War or Devil May Cry but lack the "super tedious" elements between fights.

The game targeted a release for Linux, OS X, and Microsoft Windows alongside a subsequent console launch for PlayStation 4, PlayStation Vita, Wii U, and Xbox One. Colorblind said they would have preferred to release on all platforms simultaneously, but would delay the console releases due to a lack of development staff. An Xbox One demo was displayed at the 2014 Game Developers Conference. The game was also displayed at PAX East 2014's Indie Megabooth and PAX Prime 2013. When Aztez missed its planned 2014 release window, Team Colorblind announced that their progress was healthy but slow. Aztez was released for PC on August 1, 2017. Console versions of the game were planned for a 2018 launch, but have not come out as of July 2022.

== Reception ==
Reception

Aggregate score
Aggregator	Score
Metacritic	PC: 81/100

Review score
Publication	Score
Destructoid	9/10

Aztez has received mostly positive reviews. Ian Birnbaum of PC Gamer praised the game's art style, and noted a potential trend of "historic side-scrollers" with the Greek-themed game Apotheon. GamesRadar wrote that the art style piqued their interest and the combat sustained it. ACG praised the title for its originality but noted that the combat could be confusing at times. Caz called it a stylish, substance-filled spiritual successor to the SNES title Actraiser, giving it an 8/10.

In October 2017, Team Colorblind reported a disappointing launch with only 2,000 copies sold in the first two months.
