= Risk of Rain =

2013 video game

- Developer: Hopoo Games
- Publisher: Gearbox Publishing (Note: Previously published by Chucklefish.)
- Producers: Duncan Drummond; Paul Morse
- Designers: Matthew Griffin; Duncan Drummond; Paul Morse
- Programmer: Duncan Drummond
- Artist: Duncan Drummond
- Composer: Chris Christodoulou
- Engine: GameMaker
- Platforms: Windows, OS X, Linux, PlayStation 4, PlayStation Vita, Nintendo Switch, Xbox One
- Release: November 8, 2013: Windows; November 8, 2013; OS X, Linux; October 28, 2014; PS4, Vita; April 12, 2016; Switch; September 20, 2018; Xbox One; August 30, 2019
- Genre: Roguelike
- Modes: Single-player, multiplayer

Risk of Rain is a 2013 roguelike platform game developed by Hopoo Games. Initially made by a two-student team from the University of Washington using the GameMaker engine, the game was funded through Kickstarter before being released on Microsoft Windows in November 2013. Ports for OS X and Linux versions were released a year later, with console versions being released in the later half of the 2010s.

Players control the survivor of a space freighter crash on a strange planet. Players attempt to survive by killing monsters and collecting items that can boost their offensive and defensive abilities. The game features a difficulty scale that increases with time, requiring the player to choose between spending time building experience or completing levels quickly before the monsters become more difficult. The game supports up to ten cooperative players in online play and up to two players in local play.

A 3D sequel, Risk of Rain 2, was released in August 2020. Risk of Rain Returns, a remake of the game, was released in November 2023 for Windows and Nintendo Switch.

== Gameplay ==
A player in the midst of a boss battle in Risk of Rain. The player's stats and abilities are shown at the bottom center, with the collection of passive items they've collected running along the bottom, while the time-based difficulty scale is shown at the top right.

At the start of the game, the player selects one of twelve characters. Initially, one character is available, the Commando. As the player completes various in-game objectives, more characters become available. Each character has various statistics and a set of unique moves; for example, the Sniper has the ability to hit creatures from a long distance for large, piercing damage but their firing rate is slow, while the Commando can do rapid, moderate damage at close range.

Throughout the game, the goal is to locate a teleporter, always placed in a random location on the level. As the players hunt for it, they will encounter monsters; upon death, the monsters will drop in-game money and will provide the players experience. As the players gain experience, they will level up, gaining more hit points and damage. Money can be used to open various chests, buy items at stores, activate attack drones that aid in combat, or pray at shrines that have a random chance of dropping items, described by game lore as the space freighter's cargo. There are over 110 items in the game, and these provide benefits such as passive bonuses that improve offensive or defensive capabilities, or a special usable with a cooldown. Players can only hold one usable at any time, but they can collect many passive items, including multiple versions of the same item, stacking the benefits of these items. The location of these items is randomly determined through procedural generation.

Once the players have found the teleporter, upon activating it, it begins a timed countdown event ranging from 90 seconds on Drizzle (easy) difficulty, to 120 seconds on Monsoon (hard). During this time, many more monsters, including at least one boss monster, will appear. After the countdown is over, no new monsters will appear and the players will have to find and kill all remaining monsters on the stage before they can proceed to the next level. Upon exiting the level, any remaining money the players have is converted to experience points. At the penultimate level, the players have the option of taking the teleporter to the final level, or to use the teleporter to run through previous levels again, so as to gain more experience and items; when this latter option is taken, the teleporter on these levels will allow the same choice to either proceed to the final level or continue through additional levels. On the final level, the player must fight a final boss character; if they survive, they are able to escape the planet and win the game.

The difficulty of the game is determined by a timer. The difficulty level increases every five minutes up through ten levels, with newly spawned monsters having more health and stronger attacks. Additionally, boss characters may spawn before the players have found teleporters on higher difficulties. If playing alone, the game is over when the player dies. In multiplayer mode, a player that dies must wait until the other players survive to the next level, upon which they are brought back into play.

The item drops are based on the various progress the player has made in the meta-game through repeated playthroughs. For example, defeating certain boss characters for the first time will unlock an item that can then drop in future playthroughs. Other items are based on completing certain goals, such as winning the game a number of times, or performing specific goals with each of the characters. In Rainstorm or Monsoon modes, monsters will also rarely drop log books that describe the monsters; this itself is used to unlock more items and a playable character.

== Development ==
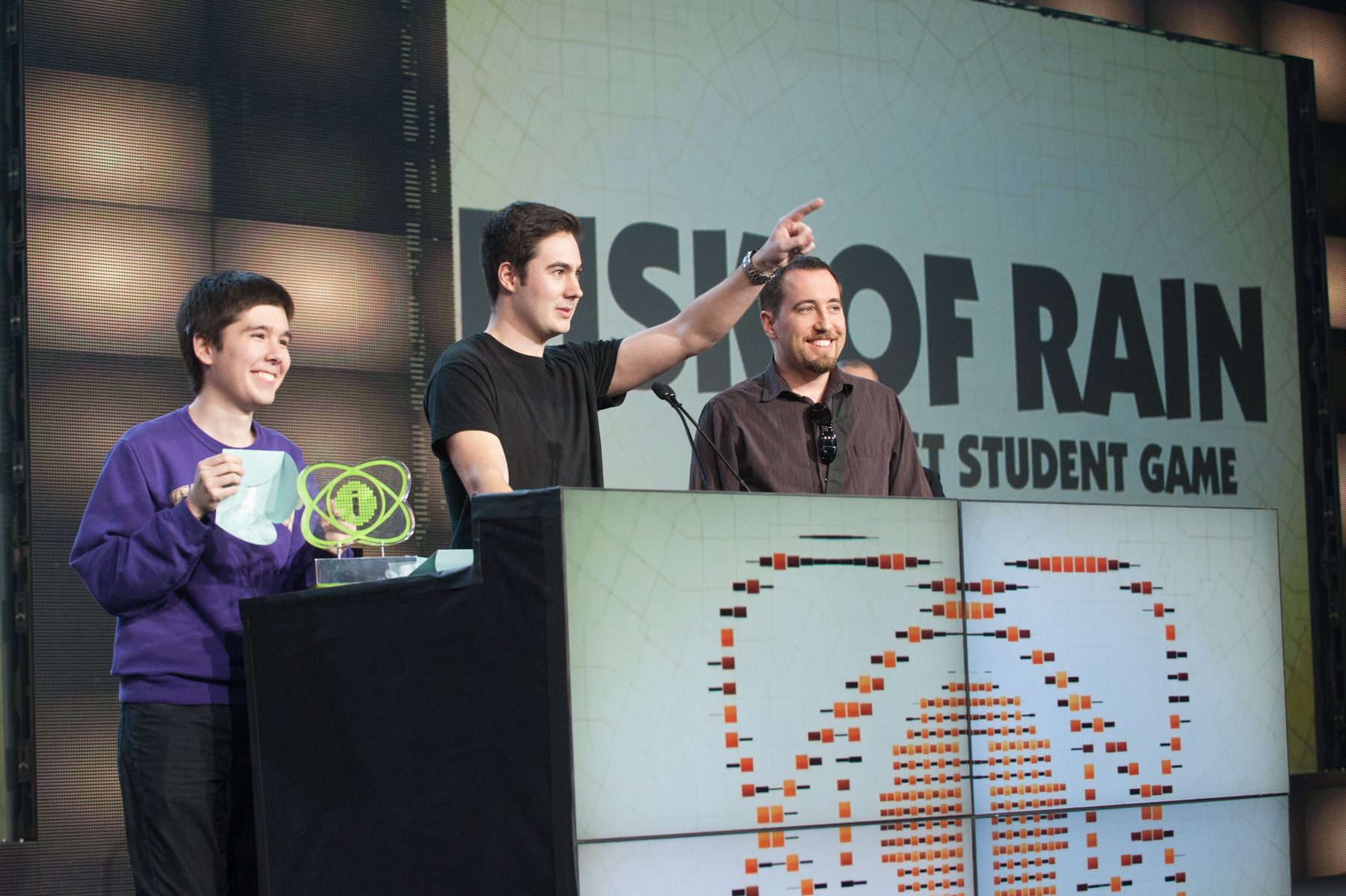
Duncan Drummond (left), Paul Morse, and Matthew Griffin of Yeti Trunk, receiving the Best Student Game award at the 2014 Independent Games Festival

Risk of Rain was developed by two students at the University of Washington, Duncan Drummond and Paul Morse, later releasing the game under the name Hopoo Games. The two took inspiration from their favorite games in the past and combined them into a single package, focusing primarily on the platformer and roguelite genres. They also wanted to add the idea of a game that scales in difficulty that "puts the player in a sense of urgency and makes them make tough choices often". Risk of Rain was developed using the GameMaker: Studio tool. The title Risk of Rain was selected not only to allow the game to be easily searchable via the Internet, but came to allude to the concept of a single protagonist in the large game world always worried about "a risk of failure or bad things happening".

The original idea Drummond and Morse had for their game, which they started developing as sophomores, was a tower defense where the difficulty of the attacking creatures would rise with the distance that they were from the defense point, but they found that players would opt to avoid venturing from that point. They sought to find a means to force the player to keep moving and came to the idea of "difficulty = time" concept. Though this is implemented so that it appears that the difficulty increases every five minutes to the player, internally, a difficulty counter is incremented every minute as to create an apparently smoother transition to the player. This counter translates into a semi-exponential growth in newly created enemies' attack strength, a semi-logarithmic growth in these enemies' health points, and a logarithmic growth in the rate that the player's health increases with character level. Drummond and Morse found this created favorable gameplay that created moments of "highs and lows" and keep the player on edge, having times where the player may feel overpowered to the enemies and moments later find themselves in a struggle to stay alive. Another mechanic they had explored with the "difficulty = time" approach was to incorporate the speed at which the player defeated enemies into the difficulty counter, but found this removed the "highs and lows" in the game.

Another element of the difficulty approach was the rate which enemies are generated. The game uses an artificial intelligence (AI) system that "buys" enemies to spawn at random intervals using a point system; this AI is given points at a rate that scales with the difficulty counter. Enemies have point values, with more difficult enemies costing more points, and the AI will buy as many as it can. Due to limitations with GameMaker, Drummond and Morse found that having too many enemies spawn in stressed the game, so they created a means for the AI to buy an "elite" enemy if it were to otherwise buy five of a single type; these elite enemies have additional attributes, such as higher attack values, and present a harder challenge to kill. They found this workaround created extra dynamism for the game, which Drummond called as "a merge of game functionality and game design". Risk of Rain was tested primarily to balance the difficulty system, and Drummon and Morse were aware that with all the available items to collect in the game, it is possible to "break the game" by acquiring specific combinations of item drops which would make the player overpowered or invincible. They believe this was still acceptable since this was highly tied to the game's random generator.

The game is presented in 8-bit-like two-dimensional graphics. This economy of graphics allowed them to both develop sprites for new enemies easily, but also allowed them to give a sense of scale to the larger bosses compared to the player's character. Character designs were made to provide enough differences between classes, and to give abilities that relied on the player's skill to give the player satisfaction of playing well, such as introducing a damage boost on the sniper's gun if the player times their reload appropriately.

After completing most of the core game on their college budgets, the Hopoo Games team turned to Kickstarter to gain additional funds to update the game to the latest version of GameMaker, obtain a musician to provide music for the game, and additional quality control. The Kickstarter was launched in April 2013 seeking $7,000, and ended up with more than $30,000 in backers. This enabled them to hire Chris Christodoulou to compose the game's soundtrack and add several additional gameplay features to the title. The success of the Kickstarter led to a publishing partnership with Chucklefish, providing them server space and forums for the game's players. They would later gain help of Matthew Griffin, from Yeti Trunk, another developer that has worked with Chucklefish, to help improve the game's multiplayer code.

The Hopoo team developed the PlayStation Vita version with Sony Computer Entertainment America, along with the PlayStation 4 version, with the assistance from Code Mystics. These versions support an online matchmaking system and the ability for two local players to join with other online players. The PlayStation versions also support cross-platform play, enabling both PlayStation 4 and Vita players to play together. Both versions were released in April 2016. A version for the Nintendo Switch was released on September 20, 2018, supporting both local and online play. An Xbox One version was released on August 30, 2019.

== Release ==
In February 2015, Hopoo Games partnered with IndieBox, a monthly subscription box service, to offer a physical release of Risk of Rain. This limited, individually-numbered, collector's edition included a flash-drive with a DRM-free game file, the official soundtrack, an instruction manual, Steam key, and various custom-designed collectible items.

A remake of Risk of Rain, Risk of Rain Returns, was released on Windows and Nintendo Switch on November 8, 2023, the tenth anniversary of the original game. The game is developed by Hopoo Games and published by Gearbox Software, who purchased the rights to Risk of Rain in 2022. Future installments in the series will be developed by Gearbox Games. Among improvements added include a reworked codebase to make later updates easier to include, higher-resolution graphics and new music from Christodoulou, better networking support for co-operative play, and characters, monsters, and items introduced in Risk of Rain 2.

== Reception ==
Reception

Aggregate scores
Aggregator	Score
Metacritic	PC: 77/100; PS4: 81/100
OpenCritic	73% recommend

Review scores
Publication	Score
Eurogamer	8/10
Game Informer	7.5/10
GameSpot	8/10
Polygon	8.5/10

Risk of Rain received generally favorable reviews from critics, according to the review aggregation website Metacritic. Fellow review aggregator OpenCritic assessed that the game received strong approval, being recommended by 73% of critics.

Risk of Rain was named one of the Student Showcase winners of the 2014 Independent Games Festival, and subsequently won the Student Prize Award. The game had sold more than three million copies by 2019.

== Sequel ==
A sequel, Risk of Rain 2, was released in early access in March 2019 and officially in August 2020.
