= Cook, Serve, Delicious! =

2013 video game

- Steam artwork
- Developer: Vertigo Gaming
- Publisher: Vertigo Gaming
- Director: David Galindo
- Artist: Sarah Gross
- Composer: Jonathan Geer
- Engine: GameMaker Studio
- Platforms: Windows, OS X, Linux, iOS, Android, Nintendo Switch
- Release: PC; 5 October 2012; Android; 29 July 2013; iOS; 16 December 2012; Nintendo Switch; 12 October 2023
- Genre: Simulation
- Modes: Single-player, multiplayer

Cook, Serve, Delicious! is a restaurant simulation video game released in 2012, developed and published by Vertigo Gaming. The player controls the menu and running of a restaurant, with in-game currency being awarded by correctly filling customer orders. Directed by David Galindo, it featured art by Sara Gross and music from Jonathan Geer. The game was released on 5 October 2012, for PC, and for Steam after a period on Steam Greenlight from 8 October 2013. It was later ported to iOS, Android and the Nintendo Switch. Cook, Serve, Delicious! drew inspiration from the 1999 video game Ore no Ryouri.

The game spawned two sequels: Cook, Serve, Delicious! 2 in 2017 and Cook, Serve, Delicious! 3 in 2020; and a spin-off titled Cook Serve Forever, which was released in 2025. A remaster of the game, subtitled Re-Mustard, is in development.

== Gameplay ==
Gameplay still of Cook, Serve, Delicious! with a full waiting line of customers and their respective orders, and the meals being cooked simultaneously

Cook, Serve, Delicious! centres on an old, worn-down restaurant in need of repair. The tower building in which the restaurant is located has had its business drop, but management has tasked the player with changing that fortune. The player is given a small amount of money and a choice of twenty foods to place on the menu, but this can be increased by purchasing new equipment for the kitchen. Customers will ask for a variety of food and drink, as well as sauces, additions and toppings.

A series of up to eight cooking stations are used to cook food simultaneously, known in-game as "prep stations". Prepping food requires navigating to the customer's order at the given prep station, and then following specific steps to complete it, given as keyboard button prompts. Orders can be customized by the customer, such as different toppings on a hamburger. Some meals require cooking time, during which other orders can be completed. A completed meal is graded by how well it was cooked - missing steps or ingredients, adding wrong ingredients, and/or cooking it improperly can lead to lower grades and a lower income for the day. The day cycle includes rush hours at lunch and dinner times, prompting more customers to come in during those times. Also during the day, chores to keep the restaurant clean, such as washing dishes, throwing out the garbage, and flushing the lavatory may show up and have to be completed, each following a similar approach to complete as cooking food.

Between days, the player can adjust the menu, purchase new recipes, equipment or decorations with money earned. Menu changes are necessary to keep customers coming, as serving too many unhealthy foods at once will turn customers away, while serving the same foods day-in and day-out will cause them to become stale and less attractive to customers.

== Development and release ==
Cook, Serve Delicious! was designed and produced by Vertigo Gaming in October 2012. It was developed by David Galindo, with art from Sara Gross and music from Jonathan Geer. Among the inspirations for the game was the PlayStation game Ore no Ryouri, which was released exclusively in Japan in 1999. Galindo had obtained a demo for the game through a gaming magazine and was intrigued by the approach and rush of the title, and inspired him to create a fan-lead version in 2004, using hand-drawn graphics. While the game was popular and he wanted to make a sequel, he lacked the funds to develop it. However, after releasing The Oil Blue, his first attempt at a full game, he had $10,000 to put towards the project.

Work started on Cook, Serve Delicious! around March 2012, with plans to release in mid-2012 as to hit during the mid-year lull of major releases. As Galindo was not a programmer, he used GameMaker Studio 8.1, which at the time was in beta development for creating Microsoft Windows releases and later would be expanded to include Android and iOS support later; he wanted to get the game released for Windows first and then release other versions once the full GameMaker Studio version was out. The game was released 5 October 2012 on PC, and then on iOS and Android on 16 December 2012, and 29 July 2013, respectively. Downloadable content was released for the game, with the name: Cook, Serve, Delicious: Extra Crispy Edition, which added ten new foods, new music tracks, controller support and support for local cooperative gameplay.

== Reception ==
Mal Scott of The Stereogram was very positive about the game, commenting that despite the game being reasonably basic, it was "much, much more than the sum of its parts." Scott also commented that the game was difficult, dubbing it the "Dark Souls of cooking games". Matt Porter of Hooked Gamers gave the game a 7.4 out of 10 rating, commenting that the game is 'surprisingly difficult at times', and that it 'has a lot of charm', but also called the game 'repetitive'. Touch Arcade's Jon Polson gave the iPad version four and a half stars, but did not think the simplified controls made the game better. Lucy Ingram of 148Apps reviewed the app version and observed that the game took "the best elements of every restaurant simulation game" and was "one of the most enjoyable and addictive games [she] ever played." She also praised the game's soundtrack and gameplay, saying that "the ultra-smooth touch controls make Cook, Serve, Delicious a joy to play."

== Other titles ==
=== Sequels and spin-off ===
Vertigo Gaming announced that a sequel to the game, entitled Cook, Serve, Delicious! 2 was to be released on 24 August 2017, and also for a release on MacOS, Linux, Xbox One and PlayStation 4. The game was delayed, and eventually released on 13 September 2017 for computers and 10 April 2019 for consoles. Cook, Serve, Delicious! 2 boasts over 180 food types, in comparison to the original's 30, with food being split into entrées, side dishes and drinks. It also includes improved graphics, as well as the ability to customize the restaurant's aesthetics.

Another sequel, Cook, Serve, Delicious! 3, was announced in August 2019 with planned early access release in January 2020. The game fully released for Microsoft Windows, PlayStation 4, Xbox One, and Nintendo Switch on October 14, 2020. This particular game is more story-driven than the previous games, taking place in a post-apocalyptic future, with the player taking the role of a human chef aboard a food truck served by robotic assistants, competing in a national food truck championship. Reflecting this, the game eliminates the chores of running the restaurant, while the player must be ready to serve numerous dishes at every stop along the route.

A spin-off, Cook Serve Forever, was released in early access in May 2023, along with a demo that was launched in January 2023. Vertigo considered Cook Serve Forever their biggest cooking game to date yet. The game was released on July 31, 2025.

=== Remaster ===
A remastered version of Cook, Serve, Delicious!, titled Cook, Serve, Delicious: Re-Mustard!, was announced by Vertigo Games in July 2023 to celebrate the 10th anniversary of the original game. Re-Mustard!, besides featuring improved graphics, will include additional story elements to better tie in with the stories of the sequels in the series. Other new features to be included are ten new foods, additional side quests, and a Typing Mode option for the computer versions of the game, where the ingredients are added by typing in their names, as well as the Chill difficulty, which did not exist in the original game.
