= Pulse (video game) =

2011 video game

Pulse: Volume One
- Developer: Cipher Prime
- Engine: Unity
- Platforms: iPad, Android
- Release: iPad: WW: 5 May 2011; Android: WW: 18 June 2013
- Genre: Music game
- Mode: Single-player

Pulse (full title: Pulse: Volume One) is a music game developed by Philadelphia-based studio Cipher Prime. The game was released in 2011 for iPad and in 2013 for Android. In June 2013 it was offered along with Aquaria, Organ Trail, Stealth Bastard Deluxe, and Fractal as part of the Humble Bundle with Android 6.

== Gameplay ==
Pulse's interface displays a fixed set of concentric rings, and a colorful moving ring that radiates from the center of the screen. Circular nodes appear atop the concentric rings, and the player conducts music by tapping the nodes when the ring of color intersects them.

== Soundtrack ==
The original Pulse: Volume One soundtrack was composed and recorded in-house by Cipher Prime co-founder Dain Saint and Kerry Gilbert. In June 2011, an update to the game (Pulse: Philly is Golden) was released, introducing four new tracks by local Philadelphia artists. A second update (Pulse: It's a Prime Christmas) was released in December 2011, adding another four tracks by Jim Guthrie, Leemus Music, 6955, and Doomcloud to the game. The original soundtrack and the updates' tracks are available for download on Cipher Prime's website.

Pulse: Volume One
No.	Title	Length
1.	"Tutorial"	1:07
2.	"Straylight"	2:05
3.	"Low Tide"	1:10
4.	"Sakura"	2:00
5.	"Porcelain Doll"	2:02
6.	"Let's Roll"	1:40
7.	"Cinder"	3:22
8.	"Cirrus"	2:44
9.	"Catnip"	1:40
10.	"High Roller"	1:43
11.	"Sahara"	2:04
12.	"Orbital Drop"	1:54
13.	"Electricity"	2:02
14.	"Black Bear"	2:14

Pulse: Philly Is Golden
No.	Title	Artist	Length
1.	"Klokwerk"	Cooper and the Fantastic Machine	1:52
2.	"Tidbits"	George & Jonathan	1:48
3.	"Veedja"	Ghost Fight	2:05
4.	"Follow My Voice"	Zilla Persona	2:04

Pulse: It's a Prime Christmas
No.	Title	Artist	Length
1.	"Belly of the Beat"	Jim Guthrie	2:09
2.	"Pop!"	Leemus Music	4:16
3.	"DT_01a"	6955	2:15
4.	"Dance of the Sugar Plum Fairy (ULTRA BLAST MIXX)"	Doomcloud	2:04

== Reception ==
Pulse received generally favorable reviews, gaining an aggregate review score of 77 on Metacritic.
