= Flight of the Icarus =

2010 video game

- Developer(s): Muse Games
- Platform(s): Windows, OS X, Linux, Web browser
- Release: Web browser: WW: April 11, 2010; Windows, OS X: WW: December 5, 2010; (Steam)
- Genre(s): Strategy, first-person shooter
- Mode(s): Single-player, multiplayer

Flight of the Icarus, formerly known as Guns of Icarus or Guns of Icarus Classic, is a steampunk-themed tower defense game by American independent developer Muse Games.

== Gameplay ==
The game takes place exclusively aboard the trading zeppelin Icarus, where the player's task is to defend the Icarus using gun turrets and by manually repairing damage sustained under fire. As the player progresses through the story, more turrets and armor upgrades can be unlocked to help combat the increasingly difficult waves of enemies encountered at the later stages of the game.

== Reception ==
GameSpot gave the original game a score of 4/10. PC Gamer gave it 44/100.

== Online version ==
In 2012, Muse Games launched a Kickstarter campaign to fund a new version of the game, Guns of Icarus Online. The campaign succeeded on February 21 with a total of $35,237 raised, where $10,000 was sought. The game held a closed beta for Kickstarter backers and pre-orderers.
