= Pepper Grinder =

2024 action-platform video game

- Developer: Ahr Ech
- Publisher: Devolver Digital
- Composer: Xeecee
- Engine: Construct 2
- Platforms: Microsoft Windows; Nintendo Switch; PlayStation 4; PlayStation 5; Xbox One; Xbox Series X/S
- Release: Windows, Switch; March 28, 2024; PS4, PS5, Xbox One, Series X/S; August 6, 2024
- Genres: Action, Platform
- Mode: Single-player

Pepper Grinder is an action-platform video game developed by indie developer Ahr Ech and published by Devolver Digital. The game was released on March 28, 2024 for Windows and Nintendo Switch. It was also released for PlayStation 4, PlayStation 5, Xbox One and Xbox Series X/S on August 6, 2024.

== Gameplay ==
Pepper Grinder is a side-scrolling platform game revolving around the titular character's versatile drilling device, which is used to traverse various obstacles, puzzles, and defeat enemies in a multitude of levels. "Grinder" functions as a multi-purpose tool which allows players to drill through terrain, revealing hidden areas and shortcuts. Pepper has the ability to propel herself in the air using Grinder, creating unique aerial maneuvers. Solving puzzles, navigating terrain, and fighting various enemies requires Pepper to change Grinders drill bits to effectively take on the different challenges they are faced with. The game features a combination of platforming, combat, and puzzle solving, with an emphasis on exploration and discovery. The game encourages players to experiment with Grinder's abilities in order to uncover secrets and progress through the game.

== Plot ==
Pepper is a peppy and adventurous girl who wields "Grinder", her super-powered drilling device. Shipwrecked and robbed of her treasure, Pepper must use her trusty sidearm to reclaim what the mischievous Narlings stole from her. Armed with Grinder, Pepper is able to navigate the game's intricate environments by burrowing through terrain and water, controlling machines to solve puzzles, and eliminating any enemies that stand between her and her missing fortune. Pepper's journey to reclaim her treasure will not be simple, as mysterious beings begin to emerge from the shadows to face Pepper.

== Development ==
Pepper Grinder is developed by Ahr Ech, an independent video game developer based in Oregon. The game draws inspiration from Namco's Dig Dug combined with the character movement of Sega's Ecco the Dolphin. The game uses the Construct 2 engine. The first trailer for Pepper Grinder was released on June 11, 2017, on Ahr Ech's YouTube channel. The game announced their collaboration with publisher Devolver Digital at the November 2022 Nintendo Indie World Showcase, initially set for a 2023 release. However, in August 2023, Devolver announced that the game has been delayed to an unknown date in 2024. In February 2024, it was announced that the game would launch on March 28, 2024.

== Reception ==
=== Critical reception ===
Reception

Aggregate scores
Aggregator	Score
Metacritic	PC: 78/100; NS: 79/100
OpenCritic	86% recommend

Review scores
Publication	Score
Game Informer	8/10
GameSpot	8/10
IGN	7/10
Nintendo World Report	8/10
PC Gamer (US)	80/100
Shacknews	8/10

Pepper Grinder received "generally favorable" reviews from critics, according to review aggregator website Metacritic. Fellow review aggregator OpenCritic assessed that the game received strong approval, being recommended by 86% of critics.

=== Accolades ===
Pepper Grinder won the award for "Best Platformer Game" at Intel Level Up 2017.
