= Splice (video game) =

2012 video game

- Developer: Cipher Prime
- Engine: Unity
- Platforms: Microsoft Windows, OS X, Linux, iOS, Android, PlayStation 3, PlayStation 4
- Release: June 13, 2012
- Genres: Puzzle, Strategy
- Mode: Single-player

Splice is a 2012 puzzle game developed by Philadelphia-based independent game studio Cipher Prime. Splice was released in 2012, and is available for PC, Mac, Linux, iPad, and Android. Splice is no longer available for download on Android, Windows, Linux, iOS, iPadOS as well as the Mac App Store.

== Gameplay ==
The player progresses through levels in Splice by rearranging groups of cells into target structures. The player has a limited number of moves (or "splices") to create each target structure; finishing a level in the fewest moves possible unlocks an "Angelic" achievement result. Over the game's seventy-seven levels, the player will encounter power-up cells with special abilities (for instance, cells that destroy themselves and their children). The player must learn to use these increasingly complex cells to form increasingly complex target structures.

== Soundtrack ==
Splice's soundtrack was composed and recorded in-house by Cipher Prime co-founder Dain Saint. The soundtrack containing the music used in the first seven sequences of the game, Flight of Angels, and the soundtrack containing the music used in its epilogue, Algorithms and Angelology, are both available for download on Cipher Prime's website.

Flight of Angels - Splice OST
No.	Title	Length
1.	"Barachiel"	2:37
2.	"Ariel"	2:21
3.	"Gabriel"	3:18
4.	"Fanuel"	2:56
5.	"Eremiel"	2:08
6.	"Darda'il"	3:13
7.	"Cassiel"	2:43

Algorithms and Angelology
No.	Title	Length
1.	"Ariadne"	2:21
2.	"Ganymede"	2:38
3.	"Phylonoe"	3:47
4.	"Daedelus"	2:57
5.	"Reflection"	3:31

== Reception ==
Splice received generally positive reviews, gaining an aggregate review score on Metacritic of 86 for iOS and Android.

=== Accolades ===
Splice won the award for "Best Puzzle Game" at Intel Level Up 2011.
