= BetaDwarf =

Danish independent video game developer

- Type: Private
- Industry: Video games
- Founded: 2010; 16 years ago
- Founder: Steffen Kabbelgaard and Kenneth Harder
- Headquarters: Copenhagen, Denmark
- Area served: Worldwide
- Key people: Steffen Kabbelgaard (CEO)
- Products: List of BetaDwarf games
- Number of employees: 50
- Website: Official website

BetaDwarf is a Danish independent video game developer based in Copenhagen, Denmark, founded in 2010. The company was formed by a small group of students in 2010, who moved into an unused classroom in Aalborg University – Copenhagen, Denmark and began developing their first game, Forced. Since, they have left the classroom and released a second game, Forced: Showdown.

== History ==
Steffen Kabbelgaard (CEO) started to look at talented people to create a company and start making games. He found Kenneth Harder (CTO) with whom he gathered a team of 4 people to start the company. The team quickly grew up to 8 members within a few months.

Through a lack of money to have an office, the newly founded Betadwarf team moved illegally into an unused classroom in Aalborg University in Copenhagen, Denmark. All members of the team left their apartments to live in this classroom that they accommodated with fridges, beds and microwave ovens. There, they worked on their first game, which would become Forced. For 7 months they lived in this classroom until a lecturer of the university accidentally walked in on them. They were forced to move out and found a house in Karlslunde that they transformed into their new company office and in which they lived in.

With no more funds, they decided to launch a Kickstarter campaign for Forced. The campaign didn't originally start successfully. But, an image posted on Imgur, which described their history and progress as a team, was seen more than a million times and drew many people to the campaign which was successfully funded up to $65,413.

The BetaDwarf team then moved into an office in Copenhagen in which they continued to live in. After the founders took a loan of $200,000 they finished their game after 3 years of development. Forced is a top-down local/online co-op action-puzzler in which the players are cast as slaves who are forced to fight in a fantasy gladiator arena until one of them tries to escape and fights his way to freedom. The game was released on Steam on 24 October 2013 and sold more than 50,000 copies within the first month. An Xbox One and PlayStation 4 version were released later in October 2015. After the success of Forced and inspired by Valve, the team worked to improve their company culture creating a flat working environment where everybody gets the same salary and much of the salary is paid as bonuses based on the performance of the products they release.

BetaDwarf then started to work on their next game FORCED 2: The Rush. During development the game was renamed to FORCED: Eternal Arenas, for which they ran another successful Kickstarter campaign. However, due to a lawsuit threat from a bigger company, demanding to change their new game's name, FORCED: Eternal Arenas became Forced: Showdown. In this top-down singleplayer bullet-hell brawler, players are cast as Contestants, which are gladiators in a galactic game show where they must battle their way through arenas to defeat the Titans waiting for them and ultimately survive to earn fame, glory and wealth.

After two years of development, Forced: Showdown was released on 29 March 2016. An Xbox One and PlayStation 4 version of the game were released later.The team released an expansion for Forced: Showdown on 31 July 2016 called Drone Invasion.

In late 2018, after roughly two years of early-access on Steam, Minion Masters became free-to-play.

In 2019, it was announced Betadwarf is working on a new game in the "friendshipping" genre.

The next project by the studio, Vaultbreakers was announced in February 2025 for Windows. Impressed by the game's quality in early access, Japanese company Square Enix assisted in funding the game's development.

== Games developed ==
Year	Title	Platform(s)				
Year	Title	Linux	Mac	PS4	Win	XBO
2013	Forced	Yes	Yes	Yes	Yes	Yes
2016	Forced: Showdown	Yes	Yes	No	Yes	No
2019	Minion Masters	No	Yes	No	Yes	Yes
TBA	Vaultbreakers	No	No	No	Yes	No

== Awards ==
- Intel Level Up Award – Best Game with 3D Graphics in 2013 – Forced
- Danish Game Awards – Best Danish Developer of the year in 2013
- Gamescom's Indie Vault – Best Gameplay in 2013 – Forced
- SpilPrisen – Best Danish Game in 2014 – Forced
- SpilPrisen – Best Game Design in 2014 – Forced
- SpilPrisen – Best Visuals in 2014 – Forced
- Intel Level Up Award – Best Game with 3D Graphics in 2014 – Forced: Showdown
- MomoCon – Indie Game Award in 2016 – Forced: Showdown
