= Denis Galanin =

Russian video game developer and children's picture book author (born 1983)

- Born: 26 April 1983 (age 43); Yekaterinburg, Russia
- Occupation: Video game developer

Denis Galanin (born 26 April 1983) is a Russian video game developer and children's picture book author. He is best known for the creation of several award-winning art games such as Hamlet and The Franz Kafka Videogame.

== Life and career ==
Denis Galanin was born in Yekaterinburg, Russia, on April 26, 1983.

Between 2003–2008, Galanin was a lead game designer at the Russian video game studio Targem Games, where he participated in the development of numerous projects.

Since 2008 he works as the independent video game developer and creates an award-winning game Hamlet. In 2017, Galanin released another award-winning game The Franz Kafka Videogame. Both projects were puzzle adventure video games.

In 2022, he debuted with the children's picture book The Amazing World of Video Game Development, which received positive reviews from John Romero, Jakub Dvorsky and other representatives of the video game industry.

== Works ==
=== Video games ===
- Battle Mages (2003)
- Battle Mages: Sign of Darkness (2004)
- Ex Machina (2005)
- Ex Machina: Meridian 113 (2006)
- Ex Machina: Arcade (2007)
- In Living Colors! (2007)
- The Swarm (2008)
- Ideabox Game (2009)
- Hamlet or the Last Game without MMORPG Features, Shaders and Product Placement (2010)
- The Franz Kafka Videogame (2017)
- inKONBINI: One Store. Many Stories (2026)

=== Literature ===
- The Amazing World of Video Game Development (2022)

== Awards and recognition ==
The works of Denis Galanin have received numerous awards.

In 2015, at Intel Level Up Game Developer Contest, Tim Schafer, Chris Avellone, Chris Taylor and other game-industry luminaries awarded the grand prix to The Franz Kafka Videogame. In addition, the game was selected for the Archive of Interactive Computer Programs in one of the most significant literary archives in the world — The German Literature Archive in Marbach.

In 2022, The Amazing World of Video Game Development won the "Best STEM Book" award from The National Science Teaching Association and The Children’s Book Council.

Sergiy Galyonkin, Director of Publishing Strategy at Epic Games, called Galanin "one of the most prominent auteurs in the indie scene".
