= Jonathan Geer =

American video game composer

- Born: Austin, Texas, U.S.
- Occupation: Composer

Jonathan Geer is an American video game music composer and musician. He has composed for a number of video games, including for Core Keeper, The Franz Kafka Videogame and Owlboy.

== Life and career ==
Jonathan Geer was born in Austin, Texas and grew up there. In 2001 he obtained a BA in Film Scoring from Berklee College of Music in Boston. After graduating, Geer spent several years teaching lots of private piano lessons and working as a church musician. He later began writing music for music libraries. His music is used on TV shows, films and documentaries.

== Works ==
- The Oil Blue (2010)
- Grim Joggers (2011)
- Azkend 2: The World Beneath (2012)
- Cook, Serve, Delicious! (2012)
- King Oddball (2012)
- Neon Chrome (2016)
- Owlboy (2016)
- Cook, Serve, Delicious! 2 (2017)
- The Franz Kafka Videogame (2017)
- Cook, Serve, Delicious! 3 (2020)
- Core Keeper (2022)
- Cook Serve Forever (2025)

== Awards ==
Year	Award	Category	Recipient	Result	Refs.
2017	The Hollywood Music in Media Awards	Best Song/Score - Mobile Video Game	Jonathan Geer (for The Franz Kafka Videogame)	Won	
