= Ore no Ryouri =

1999 video game

- Developer: Argent (Note: Additional work by Sony Computer Entertainment Japan.)
- Publisher: Sony Computer Entertainment
- Platform: PlayStation
- Release: JP: September 9, 1999
- Genre: Simulation game
- Mode: Single-player

Ore no Ryouri (俺の料理; "My Cooking") is a 1999 video game developed by Argent and published by Sony Computer Entertainment for the PlayStation. Players manage different types of restaurants, using the controller's analog sticks to perform various tasks.

It was released in Japan on September 9, 1999. Due to its success, it was re-released under the PlayStation's 'The Best' label. A one-level demo was made available in the US via PlayStation Underground, despite this the game was not released officially in North America.

A semi-sequel party game, Gacharoku, was released on the PlayStation 2.

The game inspired the 2004 fan-made remake Ore No Ryomi for English-speaking audiences, and its sequel Ore No Ryomi 2, both of which were released for free. These ultimately spawned the commercial sequel Ore No Ryomi 3, which was re-titled and sold as Cook, Serve, Delicious!, independently released for PC and Mac through Steam in 2012.

== Reception ==
On release, Famitsu magazine scored the game a 32 out of 40.
