= Owlboy =

2016 video game

- Developer: D-Pad Studio
- Publishers: D-Pad Studio (digital); Soedesco (physical)
- Director: Simon Stafsnes Andersen
- Designers: Simon Stafsnes Andersen; Adrian Bauer
- Programmers: Jo-Remi Madsen; Henrik Stafsnes Andersen
- Artist: Simon Stafsnes Andersen
- Composer: Jonathan Geer
- Engine: XNA
- Platforms: Windows; macOS; Linux; Nintendo Switch; PlayStation 4; Xbox One
- Release: Windows; November 1, 2016; macOS, Linux; January 27, 2017; Nintendo Switch; February 13, 2018; PlayStation 4, Xbox One; April 10, 2018
- Genre: Platform-adventure
- Mode: Single-player

Owlboy is a platform-adventure video game created by Norwegian independent developer D-Pad Studio. The game is notable for its long development cycle, which began in 2007, and was released in November 2016.

== Gameplay ==
The player controls Otus, who is capable of flying and carrying objects during flight. These objects vary in use, but are mainly used as ranged weapons, thrown weapons, and puzzle-solving tools. As the game progresses, Otus gains allies that accompany him during his journey, each having their own weapon with exclusive properties.

== Plot ==
Owlboy is set in the land of the sky; the islands of the world below have been separated by a catastrophic event. The player controls a boy named Otus, who is a member of an owllike humanoid race called the Owls. When Otus' village is attacked by a band of pirates, he sets out on a journey to save it from them, and uncovers the lost truth of the Owls.

=== Setting ===
Owlboy takes place in the floating settlement of Vellie. The village is made up of many different islands, and is populated with humans and owl-humanoid creatures alike. Vellie is located near the floating city of Advent which is their capital. The owls do not naturally have the ability to fly like their wild counterparts, but with the help of an owl cloak, they are given the ability to fly. The areas surrounding Vellie and Advent contain old relics and temples in them from the time the ancient owls were larger in number and ruled the land.

=== Synopsis ===
The main character is called Otus, who is mute. The game begins with a scene including Otus's mentor Asio, who is training him to be an owl. He is given an owl cloak by Asio, which gives him the ability to fly. Otus is looked down upon by the other members of Vellie, because he is accident-prone. As such, Otus is not seen as a suitable successor to the owl name. He spirals quickly into a small bout of depression, but is helped out of it by his self-proclaimed friend Geddy. Geddy is a human who serves as the Vellie Guard. When the village of Vellie is attacked by a band of pirates, he sets out on a journey with Geddy to save the village, and the rest of the world as they know it. On the way, they make more allies, including the former pirate Alphonse, and Twig, a former ally of the pirates. As they work to fight the pirates, they slowly uncover the truth of the ancient owls, and have to work to fix their mistakes.

== Development ==
The inspiration for Owlboy came from several sources, most involving Andersen's penchant for Nintendo games. The basic mechanics were inspired by the Super Mario Bros. 3 Tanooki Suit, although with reverse mechanics. Similarly, Andersen also became interested in rumors of a new game in the Kid Icarus series wondering how the flying mechanics of those games would translate to 3D, and this made Andersen realize that he felt a 2D design for his game would work better. Finally, Andersen was inspired by the then-upcoming Wii and felt that it provided a great opportunity to create an old-school game.

Beginning development in 2007, the game spent the better part of a decade in development. The team worried about the expectation of fans and thus started over several times. Andersen also had to deal with suffering from depression, which he had since childhood. Owlboy was released primarily for Windows-based personal computers, but D-Pad also considered a release for home consoles. A Nintendo Switch version was released in February 2018, with the PlayStation 4 and Xbox One versions being delayed. The game was shown off at PAX 2013. At PAX 2016, it was announced that the game would be released on November 1, 2016.

== Reception ==
Reception

Aggregate scores
Aggregator	Score
Metacritic	(PC) 88/100 (PS4) 88/100 (NS) 87/100 (XBO) 83/100
OpenCritic	88/100; 96% Critics Recommend

Review scores
Publication	Score
Destructoid	10/10
Eurogamer	Recommended
Game Informer	9/10
GameSpot	9/10
Hardcore Gamer	5/5
HobbyConsolas	86/100
IGN	9.3/10
Nintendo Life	9/10
Nintendo World Report	8.5/10
PC Gamer (US)	82/100
Push Square	9/10
The Telegraph	5/5

=== Pre-release ===
Owlboy received positive commentary from gaming publications. Kotaku's Luke Plunkett stated in 2013 that it would be "worth the wait" of its extensive development time. Regarding the art style, he mentioned, "..and the game's charming art style, which for want of something more descriptive reminds me of a Genesis version of Wind Waker." Dave Cook of VG247 described the game as "a rather neat-looking 2D pixel art platformer". Nathan Grayson of Rock, Paper, Shotgun lamented the fact that by 2013 the game still did not yet have a release date as "the bad news – the news by which all upsetting and otherwise unfortunate events are judged". The website Kill Screen would go on to compare the game's long development cycle to that of Fez, another indie game with a similarly long development period, writing and describing both games as "retro-sentimental platformers by independent studios that promised a lot, but seemed fated to never come out."

=== Post-release ===
On release, Owlboy was met with "generally favorable reviews", according to Metacritic. IGN's Chloi Rad gave the game 9.3/10 and writes that the game "shines thanks to surprisingly varied, Metroidvania-style gameplay and a charming cast of unlikely heroes". The game has sold 100,000 copies.

=== Accolades ===
Year	Award	Category	Result	Ref.
2017	New York Game Awards	Big Apple Award for Best Game of the Year	Nominated	
2017	New York Game Awards	Central Park Children's Zoo Award for Best Kids Game	Nominated	
2017	New York Game Awards	Off Broadway Award for Best Indie Game	Nominated	
2017	20th Annual D.I.C.E. Awards	Outstanding Achievement in Game Design	Nominated	
2017	National Academy of Video Game Trade Reviewers Awards	Art Direction, Fantasy	Nominated	
2017	National Academy of Video Game Trade Reviewers Awards	Game, Original Family	Nominated	
2017	SXSW Gaming Awards	Gamer's Voice Single Player	Won	
2018	Golden Joystick Awards	Best Indie Game	Nominated	

== Other media ==
Otus is featured as one of the playable characters in the indie crossover fighting game Bounty Battle.
