= Guns of Icarus Online =

2012 video game

- Developer: Muse Games
- Publisher: Muse Games
- Composers: Gimmen Gong, Andres Soto
- Series: Guns of Icarus
- Engine: Unity
- Platforms: OS X Windows; Linux; PlayStation 4
- Release: OS X, Windows; October 29, 2012; Linux; February 22, 2013; PlayStation 4 May 1, 2018
- Genres: Action, strategy
- Modes: Multiplayer, Co-op

Guns of Icarus Online (also known as Guns of Icarus Alliance) is a steampunk-themed multiplayer first-person shooter video game developed and published by American studio Muse Games. It is a follow-up to Flight of the Icarus (formerly known as Guns of Icarus Classic), and was released on October 29, 2012. A cooperative, PvE companion game Guns of Icarus Alliance was released on March 31, 2017. On December 23, 2011, Muse Games launched a Kickstarter project to raise $10,000 to partially fund the development of Guns of Icarus Online, and the company subsequently received $35,237 at the close of the bidding on February 21, 2012. Following the completion of their fundraising campaign, Muse Games co-developer Eric Chung announced that Guns of Icarus Online would enter closed beta on April 10, 2012.

Guns of Icarus Online Version 1.0 officially went online on October 29, 2012. The improved Version 1.1 was first available through Steam on November 20 and online on November 23. In early 2013, Linux support was added. A PlayStation 4 version launched May 1, 2018 with full cross-platform support.

== Gameplay ==
Guns of Icarus Online is a steampunk/dieselpunk, multiplayer, first-person shooter that focuses on airship combat. Each airship is controlled by up to four players, with each member of the crew taking a specific role. Players can choose three different classes: gunner, engineer or pilot, which allow them access to different kinds of tools. The captain of each ship chooses which weapons the ship uses. There are also several ships available:

- Galleon: the Galleon is by far the biggest and more resilient ship, but also the slowest one. It focuses on high firepower and tank capabilities with high hull armor.
- Squid: the Squid is the fastest ship in the game which allows its commander to outmaneuver enemy ships, but it is the least resilient ship and does not have a weapon slot for Heavy Weapons.
- Goldfish: the Goldfish has a main gun on its prow, and two secondary guns on the port and starboard sides and another positioned at the rear. It relies on its moderate speed and high maneuverability.
- Junker: the Junker has 5 small weapon mountings. It also has high maneuverability, but a low speed.
- Pyramidion: the Pyramidion has two guns on the top deck and two on the low deck. With very high damage output, but low turning speed, this ship is very versatile.
- Spire: the Spire has a very high turning speed, but a very low linear speed. It is a high dps ship with very low hull armor.
- Mobula: the Mobula has 5 weapons on the front, but none on the sides nor the back. It has great vertical movement, but is difficult to repair in the heat of the battle.

After being in development since late 2013, the Alliance add-on launched on March 31, 2017. This added several PvE game modes, a faction war gameplay system where players play matches to earn war effort so that their faction can take over or defend pieces of land on a map of the game world, and, at Alliance's launch, it contained four joinable factions and four new playable ships. Two new factions and their respective exclusive ships were progressively added in updates throughout spring and summer in 2017.

These new ships include:

- Magnate: A ship belonging to the Mercantile Guild faction, this decorated ship is slow-moving, but has three guns on each side; two light gun mountings and one heavy, allowing for the Magnate to have a high damage-per-second.
- Corsair: A ship belonging to the Anglean Republic, the Corsair is the largest ship in the game. This ship is heavily armoured and slightly faster than a Galleon, and has two heavy guns and light guns on each side, as well as a heavy gun on the front and a light gun on the stern, allowing the Corsair to exhibit high damage within limited intervals due to its speed and amount of weapons.
- Shrike: Specific to the Order of Chaladon, the Shrike is the second fastest ship in the game after the Squid. However, like the Squid, its hull is weak, and has only average turning speed. This ship has two heavy and light gun mounts on the port and starboard sides of the ship, making the Shrike preferable for "hit-and-run" tactics.
- Crusader: Belonging to the Fjord Baronies, the Crusader is large and heavily armed, with two heavy guns on the front and two light guns on either side, allowing for a wide frontal attack range. It has good vertical speed, but low health and armor.

The following two ships were added to Alliance after its launch:

- Stormbreaker: A patchwork airship specific to the Arashi League, this aircraft has extremely fast acceleration and decent speed, as well as fast turning. Its main firepower is concentrated on the port side, with three light guns lined along this side of the ship and a lone heavy gun on the starboard side. It is nimble, but has low health and armor.
- Judgement: Belonging to the Yesha Empire, the Judgement is versatile and has high armor, but indecent forward and turning speed, as well as low health. Its firepower is concentrated towards the front and the rear, with two forward facing light guns and a heavy gun, as well as a heavy gun and light gun facing to the rear.

== Reception ==
Guns of Icarus Online received "mixed or average" reviews, according to review aggregator Metacritic, where it received an average score of 64 out of 100 based on 7 reviews.

=== Accolades ===
Guns Of Icarus Alliance won the award for "Best 3D Graphics" at Intel Level Up 2016.

== See also ==
- Flight of the Icarus
