= Apotheon =

2015 video game

- Developer: Alientrap (Note: Ported to PlayStation 4 by Sickhead Games)
- Publisher: Alientrap
- Director: Lee Vermeulen
- Designer: Fredrik Henriksson
- Programmer: Lee Vermeulen
- Artist: Jesse McGibney
- Writer: Maciek Paprocki
- Composer: Marios Aristopoulos
- Engine: Microsoft XNA, MonoGame (Note: on PlayStation 4)
- Platforms: Windows, OS X, Linux, PlayStation 4
- Release: Windows, PS4: WW: February 3, 2015; OS X, Linux: WW: February 10, 2015
- Genres: Platform, Metroidvania
- Modes: Single-player, multiplayer

Apotheon is a platform game developed and published by Alientrap for Microsoft Windows, OS X, Linux, and PlayStation 4. The game was released on Microsoft Windows and PlayStation 4 on February 3, 2015 and on OS X and Linux on February 10, 2015. Apotheon is Alientrap's second commercial game and utilizes a unique art style based on ancient Greek pottery, particularly in the black-figure pottery style.

== Gameplay ==
A screenshot of Apotheon, with the player character Nikandreos on the right

Apotheon is a 2D action game with an art style and heroic narrative based on Ancient Greek mythology. The player controls Nikandreos, a young warrior who, with the help of the goddess Hera, fights against the Olympian gods, using various weapons of the Ancient Greeks.

== Plot ==
In Ancient Greece, the Gods have begun to punish the humans of Earth, resenting their arrogance and defiance among their societies. Zeus, the king of all the Gods, has forced the Olympians to stop giving their gifts of life to the Earth, so that all humans are soon deprived of animals, food, and even daylight. With most of the Earth cast in darkness, man begins to fall prey to the savage destruction of their cities.

Meanwhile, in the Village of Dion, invaders ransack the entire area and lay waste to most of the village. A young warrior named Nikandreos awakens to find his home destroyed and many of the raiders killing Dion's soldiers and citizens. Arming himself and with the help of the surviving soldiers, Nikandreos is able to cast away the invading forces and slay their leader. In the temple, Nikandreos meets face-to-face with Hera, the wife of Zeus, who congratulates him for his victory in saving the village. Hera informs Nikandreos of Zeus' anger with the humans, as well as her hatred for his many affairs with other gods and mortals. Wanting revenge as well as a way to help Nikandreos save his people, Hera tasks him with slaying Zeus and his siblings so that Nikandreos might bring back their gifts and save humanity. Nikandreos agrees and ascends to Mount Olympus to begin his hunt against the Gods of Greece.

Nikandreos first enters the Agora of Olympus, where he must find and take the gifts from the gods Artemis, Demeter, and Apollo. Heading into the Forest of Artemis, Nikandreos completes many hunts of fantastical creatures until he gains the goddess' attention. After a short dialogue, Artemis attacks Nikandreos and in the fight that follows the two are alternatively turned into deer and hunter. The battle ends with Nikandreos' victory and Artemis' death, and as the goddess of the hunt vanishes into nothingness, Nikandreos takes her magical bow and heads towards Apollo. Nikandreos reaches Apollo and attempts to slay him, but he is knocked unconscious and imprisoned within a cell. With the help of the god Helios, who had also been imprisoned by Apollo, Nikandreos escapes and is able to slay all of Apollo's captains and save Daphne from her own imprisonment as a tree. Nikandreos then slays Apollo and takes his lyre. However, while searching for Demeter, she reveals she cannot give her sheaf, feeling sorrow for the taking of her daughter Persephone. Nikandreos finally descends into the lair of Hades to find Persephone, his wife, who instead of fighting back, willingly gives her seeds to him so that he may bring life back to Earth. In return, Demeter sympathizes with Nikandreos and hands over her sheaf, too. There are also some gods, like Aphrodite and Dionysus, who secretly oppose Zeus' actions and can provide items to aid Nikandreos if he meets them.

While attempting to head back to his village, however, Zeus halts Nikandreos and accuses him of arrogance and attempting to become a god, and thrusts him back to Earth. Nikandreos lands to find Dion in more ruin than before, with the wrath of the Gods now extending to physical aggression on Earth. Hera apologizes for her earlier refusal to help, but warns Nikandreos that Zeus has now tasked the remaining powerful gods Poseidon, Ares, and Athena to bring fury and destroy all of humanity. Heading toward the Acropolis of Olympus, Nikandreos goes to kill each of the final gods, in return becoming more and more powerful by stripping them of their powers. However, upon returning once more to Dion, Nikandreos finds his home and his entire people annihilated and in waste. Hera tells him though that the time to strike Zeus is now, with most of his children and brethren slain and the power now in Nikandreos' hands. In a final single raid on the Fortress of Zeus, Nikandreos boldly ascends to the heavens of Olympus. He finds Hera chained with Zeus knowing her betrayal, leading to a final battle between the man and the god. Nikandreos successfully slays Zeus, gaining the right to power from Zeus' thunderbolt. Hera boasts at her victory and demands that Nikandreos free her. However, Nikandreos is sick of the rule of Gods and Hera's manipulations. At this point the player can choose to leave Hera or to kill her with Zeus' thunderbolt.

Descending back to Earth, Nikandreos finds a giant-sized Zeus bragging and roaring of his own victories as a God, refusing to believe in his own defeat by a mere mortal. With all of the powers of the Gods within him now, however, Nikandreos also grows to the size of a God, and brutally fights and finally kills Zeus. Seeing the Earth in sad ruins, Nikandreos roams the desolate landscape. In finding some clay and rubble, Nikandreos forms a human being and gives it life, signaling the rebirth of humanity and the fall of the Gods. It is left open if Nikandreos will be a loving god himself, or grow disillusioned with his creation like the gods before him.

The name Apotheon means "exalted to the state of godhood", which reflects the deification of Nikandreos, the protagonist, at the end of the game.

== Release ==
In August 2015, Alientrap joined forces with IndieBox, a monthly subscription box service, to produce an exclusive, custom-designed, physical release of Apotheon. This limited, individually-numbered collector's included a flash-drive with a DRM-free copy of the game, the official soundtrack, an instruction manual and Steam key, and several custom-made collectible items. The game was also later released for free for the PlayStation Network subscribers.

== Reception ==
Reception

Aggregate score
Aggregator	Score	
Aggregator	PC	PS4
Metacritic	78/100	76/100

Apotheon received generally favorable reviews from critics, with a score on review aggregator Metacritic of 78/100 and 76/100 for the Microsoft Windows and PlayStation 4 versions respectively. Critics generally praised the game's aesthetic and entertaining combat. Writing for Game Informer, Bryan Vore called Apotheon a "damn fun game and one of my surprise early favorites of 2015". Patrick Hancock of Destructoid felt it "more than backs up its aesthetic prowess with rewarding combat and exploration systems in place". Many reviewers noticed a Metroidvania influence; John-Paul Jones of GameWatcher applauded its "homage to the engrossing Castlevania and Metroid games pioneered back in the 8-bit days". Nicholas Plouffe of Canadian Online Gamers also recommended the game to fans of the Metroidvania genre.

Writing for Hardcore Gamer, Alex Carlson felt the gameplay mechanics were shallow. He concluded "Apotheon is a classic case of style over substance". Philippa Warr of Rock, Paper, Shotgun described Apotheon as "an attractive but shallow game whose more interesting ideas are marred by an unwieldy control system". Other reviewers of the PlayStation 4 version noted crashes and bugs that hampered their experience.

=== Soundtrack ===
Push Square has named Apotheon's soundtrack as the 2nd best PlayStation soundtrack of 2015. 'Paste Magazine placed it in number 3, while Fact Magazine and IGR placed it in number 6.
