= Elsinore (video game) =

2019 adventure game

- Developer: Golden Glitch
- Publisher: Golden Glitch
- Designers: Katie Chironis; Connor Fallon
- Programmers: Eric Butler; Kristin Siu; Duncan Boehle
- Artists: Wesley Martin; Valeria Reznitskaya
- Engine: Unity
- Platforms: Windows; Linux; macOS
- Release: July 22, 2019
- Genre: Adventure
- Mode: Single-player

Elsinore is a 2019 point-and-click adventure game developed and published by Golden Glitch for Windows, Linux, and macOS. The game follows the character of Ophelia from William Shakespeare's Hamlet. In Elsinore, Ophelia has a vision of the deaths of everyone in Elsinore Castle and relives the same four days again and again as she works to prevent the tragedy that will fall over everyone.

Development on Elsinore took over seven years, and was carried out on nights and weekends by its development team. The game received generally positive reviews from critics, who noted that fans of Hamlet would appreciate it but that the game's slow pace could be sometimes frustrating.

== Gameplay ==
Laertes and Hamlet duel as Ophelia watches. The journal and other ways the player can see what is happening in Elsinore Castle are found in the top left, while a map shows Ophelia's current location in the top right.

Elsinore is a point-and-click adventure game based on William Shakespeare's play Hamlet. The player controls the character of Ophelia as she experiences a time loop leading up to the tragedy at the end of the play. During the four days leading up to those events, the player moves Ophelia throughout Elsinore Castle and talks with its residents in order to manipulate the outcome of events. The conversations the player has leads to unforeseen outcomes in which tragedy still occurs in other ways—every time Ophelia dies, the time loop begins again, four days before the end of Hamlet.

To manipulate events, the player talks to the castle's residents about events that they have witnessed or expect to occur. The game provides a "Hearsay" menu, which shows which topics can be broached. As Ophelia goes through multiple loops and witnesses scenes, she remembers these when she wakes up again and can bring them up to other characters. The game includes a branching timeline that shows the player possibilities they can be aware of, showing both the location of an event to happen and the time of it. Outside of Ophelia's deaths, the game has 13 unique endings that change based on the player's choices throughout the game.

== Plot ==
The plot of Hamlet revolves around the Danish court of the recently deceased King Hamlet. Denmark fears that an invasion from Prince Fortinbras of Norway could be imminent. Prince Hamlet, son of the recently deceased king and nephew to King Claudius, meets his father's ghost. The ghost reveals that he was murdered by Claudius and makes Hamlet vow to avenge his death. Believing him to be Claudius, Hamlet accidentally kills Polonius, enraging Polonius' son, Laertes. After an attempt to kill Hamlet fails, Claudius and Laertes plot to murder him in a duel by using a poisoned sword and poison in the prince's drink. Ophelia, Laertes' sister, drowns Hamlet returns for Ophelia's funeral and gets into a fight with Laertes. Hamlet and Laertes duel, and through various means both of them die along with Claudius and Queen Gertrude. Fortinbras arrives as Hamlet's heir and takes the crown of Denmark.

Elsinore begins with a vision of the deaths of everyone in Elsinore Castle, similar to the play's ending. Ophelia then manipulates events to achieve a different outcome. If the player does nothing, the events unfold as in the play and everyone dies. After Ophelia's first death, a time loop begins where she wakes up at the moment of Hamlet where Prince Hamlet is behaving erratically in her room. Ophelia's actions directly affect the plot in sometimes unpredictable ways. If Ophelia continually talks to people in Elsinore Castle about the supernatural dreams she has been having, the characters will send Ophelia off to an institution because they are convinced she has gone insane. Players can convince Hamlet to ally with Ophelia and to have him trust her with his plot, but to do so the player must find a way to access and then Queen Gertrude's chambers for evidence that she was not complicit with the murder of her late husband. By confronting King Claudius with evidence that he has murdered Queen Gertrude, Claudius arranges a private meeting with Ophelia and murders her. The player can cause a large variety of often tragic events to transpire, and, directly or indirectly, cause the death of every resident in Elsinore Castle, with mundane actions - informing Claudius of the rumors of Hamlet Sr.'s ghost - often leading to violent outcomes. As the game progresses, the player gains more tools to influence the world around them, sometimes in irreversible ways.

The game enlarges Ophelia and Laertes' roles, and adds additional characters from other Shakespeare plays such as Othello, and Peter Quince from A Midsummer Night's Dream. Quince replaces the acting troupe from Hamlet, and is one of the few characters that is aware of Ophelia's time loop. Several characters have also been adapted for the game, such as Rosencrantz and Guildenstern being female and Ophelia and Laertes being biracial, with both experiencing of racial discrimination. A lady-in-waiting named Brit and a cook named Irma round out a more gender balanced cast.

== Development ==
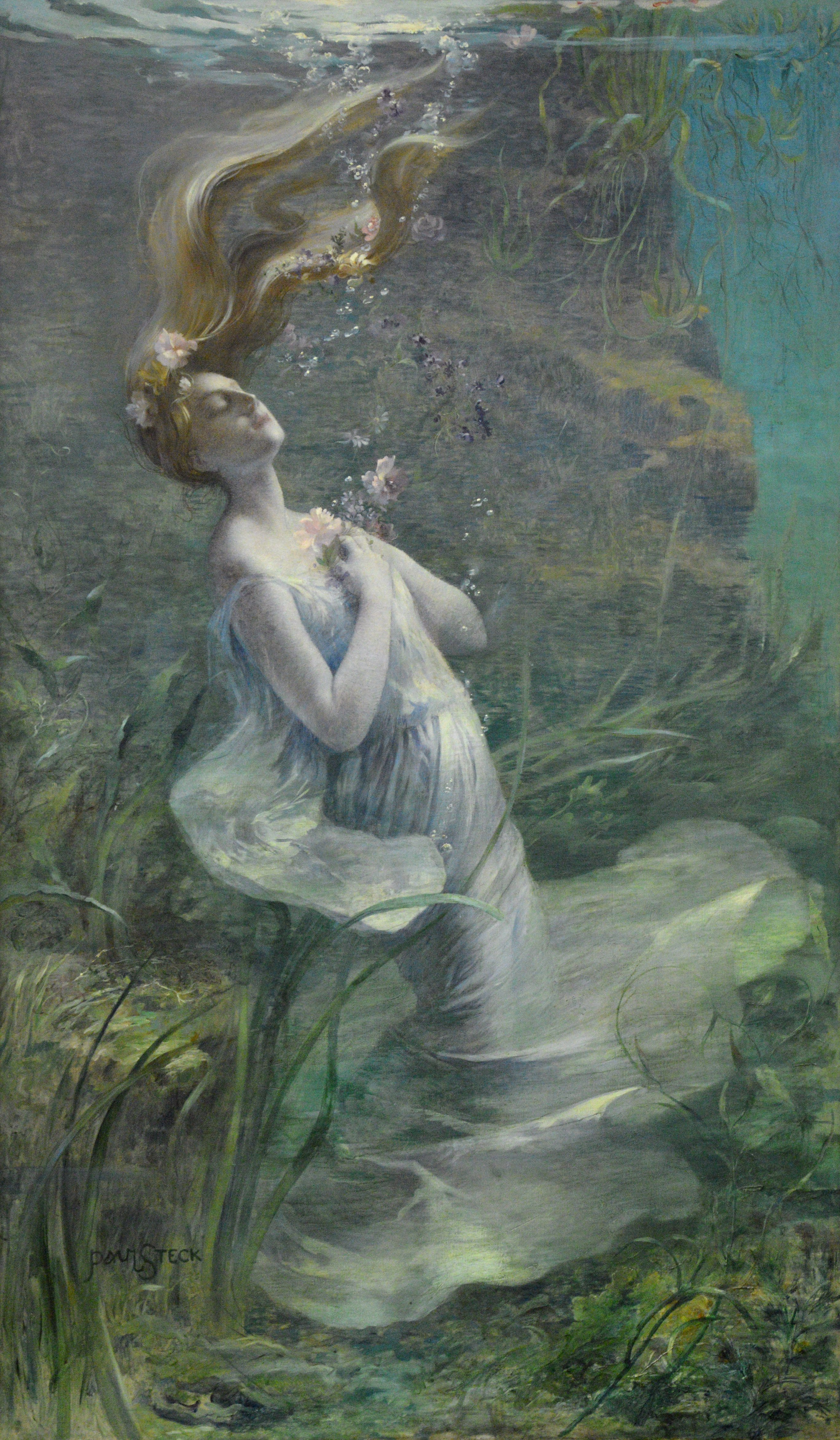
In Hamlet, Ophelia has no agency and drowns herself at the end of act 4, making her an apt choice as the player character in Elsinore.

Team lead and writer Katie Chironis and game designer Connor Fallon originally met in Carnegie Mellon University's Game Creation Society. Development of Elsinore began in 2010. Chironis and Fallon originally created Elsinore as part of a game jam, scrapped the project entirely, and then decided to create it from the ground up again. Chironis was inspired to make a Hamlet game by both her high school Shakespeare teacher and from the college writing classes she took at Carnegie Mellon. Chironis and Fallon wanted to create a game that would have a tragic story but in an interactive medium, eschewing the "power fantasy" games that are commonly created. By combining the tragedy of the play with the goal of "winning" games, the development team thought they could have a fresh take on Hamlet.

Chironis and Fallon created their company, Golden Glitch, with five others that had been part of the Game Creation Society, and worked on the project during nights and weekends while keeping their day jobs. The founders received no payment until after the game went on sale, and the team's four contractors were paid from their personal salaries from their other jobs. In 2015, Golden Glitch created a Kickstarter for Elsinore, which was successfully funded and raised over $32,000. Despite an original targeted release date of September 2016, the game was not released until 2019.

The Legend of Zelda: Majora's Mask provided inspiration for how to implement time loops in the game, and Golden Glitch drew inspiration from anime and visual novels which had many examples of time loops as a plot mechanic. Golden Glitch decided to focus on Ophelia as the protagonist because of her lack of agency in Hamlet. Her early exit by suicide in the play means that she is uninvolved in much of the action that comes later on, and it gave the development team room to try to make her a stronger character. The team also decided to make Ophelia a woman of color, and created her with the idea that she was of Moorish descent through her mother's line. The writers believed that this modification and some others allowed them to ensure that all of the characters had more fleshed out and unique storylines.

== Reception ==
Reception

Aggregate score
Aggregator	Score
Metacritic	68/100

Review scores
Publication	Score
Adventure Gamers	3.5/5
USgamer	3/5

Award
Publication	Award
Power of Play 2017	Most Unique Game

Praise for the game was centered especially on the writing, and the mostly perceived success of adapting Hamlet towards a video game medium. Wired's Julie Muncy praised Elsinore for its "beautiful writing" and "humanistic flourishes". The Los Angeles Times's Todd Martens commented positively on the game's parallels with modern experiences. Polygon's Cass Marshall compared the game positively to Long Live the Queen, but noted that unlike in that game, Elsinore's mechanics meant that progress always felt positive, praising the deep levels of character that can be explored. GameSpot's Phil Hornshaw listed the game in GameSpot's "Best of 2019: Editor's Spotlight Awards" and praised the game for being full of "well-executed ideas".

Criticism for the game's long waiting periods was tempered by feelings on the overall game. Kotaku's Harper Jay noted that the slow pace "wouldn't be for everyone" but felt that if players could make it through it, the game was a worthwhile experience. US Gamer's Eric Van Allen noted that the waiting periods can "grate" after a while, but that the game was largely successful in creating a positive narrative experience.

=== Accolades ===
The game was nominated for "Excellence in Design" and "Excellence in Narrative" at the IGF Awards, and for "Best Original Choral Composition", "Best Original Song" with "Fair as a Rose", and "Best Original Soundtrack Album" at the 18th Annual G.A.N.G. Awards. Elsinore won the award for "Best Adventure/Role Playing Game" at Intel Level Up 2016. In 2024, Game Rant included the game on the list of the 10 Best Games Based On Shakespeare's Plays.
