= Tim Shiel =

Australian radio announcer and musician

- Occupations: Radio announcer and electronic musician
- Years active: 2005–present
- Notable work: Radio show "Something More"

Tim Shiel is an Australian radio announcer and electronic musician, best known for hosting the radio shows Something More on Triple J, and Arvos on Double J. Shiel has been releasing music since 2005 and has been used for film, television, advertising and award-winning video games. As a producer, mix engineer and consultant he has worked with artists including Flight Facilities, Planète, Georgia Fields, Hachiku, Braille Face, Huntly, Ben Abraham and Wrabel.

== Career ==
Shiel's radio career started on 3RRR in 2008.

In 2012, Shiel performed internationally as a multi-instrumentalist in the touring band for Gotye.

In 2013, Shiel composed the music for the video game, Duet.

In 2014, Shiel established the record label Spirit Level in partnership with Gotye (Wally De Backer) to support the Australian release of Zammuto's album, Anchor.

In 2015, Shiel performed the Duet soundtrack live accompanied by the Queensland Symphony Orchestra.

In 2017, Shiel composed the music for the video game, Induction.

Shiel hosts radio shows Something More, which is broadcast on Triple J and Arvos on Double J.

In 2021 Sheil collaborated with Mindy Meng Wang, Chinese/Australian composer and player of the ancient Chinese instrument, the guzheng (or Chinese zither). They released a single, "Hidden Qi 隐.气" in February, followed by an EP, Nervous Energy 一 触即发 in March of that year.

== Discography ==
=== Albums ===
List of albums with selected details
Title	Details
Duet (Original Game Soundtrack)	Released: October 2013; Label: Tim Shiel; Format: Digital
Duet Duets (Tim Shiel and Friends)	Released: March 2014; Label: Spirit Level; Format: Digital
GameLoading: Rise of the Indies (Original Documentary Soundtrack)	Released: March 2015; Label: Spirit Level; Format: Digital
Induction	Released: March 2017; Label: Spirit Level; Format: Digital
Glowing Pains: Music from the Gardens Between	Released: October 2018; Label: Spirit Level; Format: Digital
Glowing Pains: Deep Cuts	Released: May 2019; Label: Spirit Level; Format: Digital
Distractions One	Released: October 2021; Label: Spirit Level; Format: Digital
Distractions One: Variants	Released: 2 March 2022; Label: Spirit Level; Format: Digital
Distractions Two	Released: November 2022; Label: Spirit Level; Format: Digital

=== Extended plays ===
List of EPs with selected details
Title	Details
Tim Shiel	Released: June 2014; Label: Spirit Level; Format: Digital
Duet: Encore Chapters	Released: February 2015; Label: Spirit Level; Format: Digital
Overloading '15	Released: July 2020; Label: Spirit Level; Format: Digital; Note: Previously unreleased tracks from Tim Shiel's 2015 soundtrack GameLoading.
Nervous Energy (with Mindy Meng Wang)	Released: March 2021; Label: Music in Exile; Format: Digital
Something to Give (with Achingdrum)	Released: September 2022; Label: Spirit Level; Format: Digital
Jack Druids	Released: 26 October 2022; Label: Spirit Level; Format: Digital

== Awards and nominations ==
=== Intel Level Up Awards ===
Year	Nominee / work	Award	Result	Ref.
2014	Duet (Kumobius & Tim Shiel)	Game of the Year	Won	
2014	Duet (Kumobius & Tim Shiel)	Best Action Game	Won	
2014	Duet (Kumobius & Tim Shiel)	Best Sound	Won	

=== Music Victoria Awards ===
The Music Victoria Awards are an annual awards night celebrating Victorian music. They commenced in 2006.

Year	Nominee / work	Award	Result	Ref.
2022	Tim Shiel	Best Producer	Nominated	
2023	Mindy Meng Wang (王萌) & Tim Shiel	Best Group	Nominated	
2023	Tim Shiel	Best Electronic Work	Nominated	
