= Lilly Looking Through =

2013 adventure game

- Developer: Geeta Games
- Platforms: Windows, OS X
- Release: 1 November, 2013
- Genre: Adventure
- Mode: Single player

Lilly Looking Through is a 2013 adventure video game developed and published by the independent studio Geeta Games. The game tells the story of a little girl named Lilly who has magical goggles.

== Description ==
Lilly Looking Through is a point-and-click adventure game without inventory or dialogues.

The plot tells the story of a girl named Lilly who is searching for her younger brother, Row. During her journey, Lilly finds magical goggles and gains the ability to travel into the past.

The gameplay focuses on solving various puzzles by interacting with objects in both the past and the present.

== Development ==
Geeta Games was founded in 2012 by Steve Hoogendyk and Jessica Hoogendyk, who previously worked in the film industry.

The game was successfully crowd-funded through Kickstarter in 2013.

== Reception ==
Reception

Aggregate score
Aggregator	Score
Metacritic	71/100

Review scores
Publication	Score
Adventure Gamers	4/5 stars
Destructoid	8/10

Upon release, Lilly Looking Through received "mixed or average" reviews by users and critics.

=== Accolades ===
Year	Award	Category	Result	Ref.
2013	The Aggie Awards	Best Animation	Won	
2013	Intel Level Up Game Developer Contest	Best Adventure/Role Playing Game	Won	
2013	Intel Level Up Game Developer Contest	Best Art Design	Won	
