= The Franz Kafka Videogame =

2017 indie adventure game

- Developer: Denis Galanin
- Publisher: Daedalic Entertainment
- Composer: Jonathan Geer
- Engine: Moai
- Platforms: Microsoft Windows, iOS, Android
- Release: Windows: WW: 6 April 2017; iOS: WW: 18 July 2017; Android: WW: 3 July 2018
- Genres: Adventure, puzzle
- Mode: Single-player

The Franz Kafka Videogame is an indie adventure game inspired by the writings of Franz Kafka. It was developed by Denis Galanin.

== Plot ==
The protagonist, K., gets a sudden offer of employment. This event changes his life, forcing him to make a distant voyage. To his surprise, the world beyond his homeland appears to be stranger than he thought.

== Gameplay ==
The Franz Kafka Videogame features gameplay similar to Denis Galanin's previous game. The player interacts with the world through a simple point and click interface. The goal of The Franz Kafka Videogame is to solve a series of puzzles and brain teasers. The puzzles are sequentially linked, forming an adventure story. The game contains no inventory, and the solving of puzzles mainly consists of clicking onscreen elements in the correct order. Solving a puzzle will immediately transport the player character to the next screen.

== Development ==
The Franz Kafka Videogame was developed over a period of 2.5 years by Denis Galanin.

The game was fully improvised throughout the entire period of development.

== Reception ==
Reception

Aggregate scores
Aggregator	Score
Metacritic	PC: 64/100
OpenCritic	66/100; 17% Critics Recommend

Review scores
Publication	Score
Riot Pixels	80/100
Adventure Gamers	2.5/5
Digitally Downloaded	3.5/5

The announcement of The Franz Kafka Videogame in 2013 attracted the interest of such non-video game media as Time, NBC News, NY Daily News, etc.

The game was recognized as a cultural asset and selected for the permanent collection of Deutsches Literaturarchiv Marbach.

On review aggregate OpenCritic, The Franz Kafka Videogame had an average 66 out of 100 review score with 17% approval rating based on 12 reviews. On review aggregator Metacritic, the game received a 64 out of 100, indicating "mixed or average reviews".

Critics praised the visual style, while criticizing the short length and confusing puzzles. Riot Pixels said the game was "a beautiful nightmare, cozy and purple like A-minor." Renata Ntelia at Adventure Gamers said it was "a pleasant little puzzle game that will evoke a lightweight nostalgia for people that have prior knowledge of its namesake's work," but argued that "its limited gameplay ultimately doesn't provide anything more than a couple hours, at most, of surreal diversion." Harvard L. at Digitally Downloaded called it "a game which is often confusing and unintuitive, but it gets away with it under the guise of being true to its source material.

=== Accolades ===
Year	Award	Category	Result	Ref
2015	Intel Level Up Game Developer Contest	The Grand Prix (Game of the Year)	Won	
2015	Intel Level Up Game Developer Contest	Best Adventure/Role Playing Game	Won	
2017	The Hollywood Music in Media Awards	Best Song/Score - Mobile Video Game	Won	
2017	TOMMI Award	Best PC Game	Nominated	
2017	TapTap Game Awards	Best Visual Art	Nominated	
2018	The Pedagogical Media Prize	Best Educational Games for Adolescents	Won	
2018	14th International Mobile Gaming Awards		Nominated	
