= Bulb Boy =

2015 video game

- Developer: Bulbware
- Publisher: Bulbware
- Programmers: Artur Mikołajczyk; Mateusz Małek
- Artist: Szymon Łukasik
- Composer: Bartosz Gajdarski
- Engine: Unity
- Platforms: OS X, Windows, iOS, Android, Nintendo Switch, Xbox One, PlayStation 4
- Release: OS X, Windows: NA: October 29, 2015; iOS: NA: July 21, 2016; Android: NA: September 8, 2016; Nintendo Switch: NA: July 6, 2017; PAL: July 13, 2017; JP: July 20, 2017; Xbox One: WW: October 6, 2017; PlayStation 4: WW: March 1, 2018
- Genre: Point-and-click adventure
- Mode: Single-player

Bulb Boy is a 2D point-and-click horror adventure video game developed and published by Bulbware. It was released on PC in 2015, on Android and iOS in 2016. The Nintendo Switch version was released in North America on July 6, 2017, in the PAL region on July 13, 2017, and in Japan on July 20, 2017 .

On October 6, 2017, it was released worldwide for the Xbox One. And it was released on PlayStation 4 on March 1, 2018.

== Reception ==
Reception

Aggregate scores
Aggregator	Score
Metacritic	PC: 84/100; NS: 75/100
OpenCritic	75/100; 70% Critics Recommend

Review score
Publication	Score
TouchArcade	iOS: 4/5

Review aggregator Metacritic gave the Switch version of Bulb Boy a score of 75 out of 100, indicating "generally favorable reviews". Writing for Nintendo World Report, Justin Nation gave the game an 8/10. He praised the game's artstyle, positively comparing it to the work of The Ren & Stimpy Show creator John Kricfalusi calling the visuals "a lot of fun". He also praised the music, feeling that it was "appropriately themed" and helped "reinforce what's on the screen nicely". The touch controls were similarly lauded, with Nation calling the game "easy to pick up" as a result. Of the few gripes Nation had with Bulb Boy, its short length was one of them. He also bemoaned one instance where a control option wasn't clear to him, causing a puzzle to stump him for the "wrong reason".

Ryan Craddock of Nintendo Life, similarly gave the Nintendo Switch version of Bulb Boy a positive review, citing its "successful mixture of ideas" which "see you doing different things as you progress through the story." Craddock also praised its "simple" controls, noting that while the lack of touchscreen input in a point-and-click style game might seem like a "missed opportunity", it meant that players would have the same experience whether in handheld or TV mode. Positive mention was also given to the game's final boss, which Craddock felt "offered a slightly different experience that was put together nicely". He ultimately gave the game a "great" rating of 8/10 concluding that while it may be short, it was "clearly lovingly put-together" and managed to "refreshingly" make horror "cute and fun, rather than take itself seriously".

Users on Metacritic gave the Xbox version of Bulb Boy a 7.6/10.

=== Accolades ===
Bulb Boy won the award for "Best Character Design" at Intel Level Up 2015.
