= Forced: Showdown =

2016 action role-playing video game

- Developer: BetaDwarf
- Publisher: BetaDwarf
- Director: Steffen Kabbelgaard
- Engine: Unity
- Platforms: Microsoft Windows; OS X Linux
- Release: March 29, 2016
- Genre: Action role-playing
- Mode: Single-player

Forced: Showdown is a top-down single-player bullet-hell brawler developed by Danish indie game developer BetaDwarf. The game was released in March 2016 for Windows, OS X and Linux through Steam as well as GOG.com. The game revolves around Contestants fighting for wealth and glory in an ever-changing galactic game show. The gameplay mixes roguelike aspects with a trading-card game. It consists of selecting a champion, enhancing and empowering him and his abilities to battle through hordes of minions and dodging their attacks to survive.

== Gameplay ==
The player fights through a number of arenas, killing enemies along the way and playing cards. After 8 arenas, the player has completed a Battle, which is a small part of each campaign. Completing enough battles finishes the campaign. There are 4 campaigns in the game. Players have at their disposal 4 (5 with the Drone Invasion expansion) characters, each one with their unique set of skills, that they must choose before entering a show.

Deckbuilding is an important aspect of Forced: Showdown. Each deck must contain exactly 30 cards and at maximum 2 of each card. There are 3 types of cards : upgrade cards, spell cards and consumable cards. Each card has its own mana cost, related to its power. At the beginning of each arena, the player will receive some mana that he can use to play cards. The amount of mana gained increases by 1 after each arena thus allowing to play stronger and more expensive cards.

== Plot ==
The players are cast as contestants, gladiators in a galactic game show in which they must battle their way through, defeat the Titans waiting for them and ultimately survive to earn fame, glory and wealth. CSAR, the Computer-Simulated Arena Referee, acting as the show presenter accompanies the player throughout the show. In the first program, or campaign, called The Crucible, the player faces Raff the Burninator, a large demon wielding fiery swords. In Frontline, the second program, the player must defeat the wealthy Ruby Von Wouthingtonne IV and her tank. Then, in The Grand Return, the mysterious Master opposes the player. Finally, in The Mentor's Maze (the campaign from the Drone Invasion expansion), the wise R3-KT will be the player's final opponent. Only by defeating all these enemies and their minions will the player become the next champion.

== Development and release ==
In 2013 BetaDwarf started work on their next game Forced 2: The Rush. During development the game was renamed to Forced: Eternal Arenas, for which they ran another successful Kickstarter campaign. However, due to a lawsuit threat from a bigger company, demanding to change their new game's name, Forced: Eternal Arenas became Forced: Showdown. A beta version of the game was accessible in 2014. After a little more than two years of development, Forced: Showdown was released on 29 March 2016. An Xbox One and PlayStation 4 version of the game are planned to be released later. The team released an expansion for Forced: Showdown on 31 July 2016 called Drone Invasion.

In December 2016, BetaDwarf joined forces with IndieBox to create an exclusive, custom-designed, physical version of Forced: Showdown. This limited collector's edition included a DRM-free game disc, the soundtrack, an instruction manual, Steam key, and various collectible items.

== Reception ==
Forced: Showdown received generally positive and mixed reviews from critics. Review aggregation website Metacritic gathered an average rating of 67 out of 100 based on 14 critics for the PC version.

JeuxActu commented that it “ is a clever little game that skillfully mixes action elements to a card game core, providing a lot of fun” giving it an 80%. Areajugones gave it a 70 out of 100 describing Forced: Showdown as a “very solid, surprising and original” game. Destructoid criticised the game for its repetitiveness giving it a 55 out of 100 and CGMagazine described that “Nothing about it feels genuine” rating it a 50 out of 100.

== Awards ==
- Intel Level Up Award - Best Game with 3D Graphics in 2014 - Forced: Showdown
- MomoCon - Indie Game Award in 2016 - Forced: Showdown
