= Cook, Serve, Delicious! 2 =

2017 restaurant simulation video game

Cook, Serve, Delicious! 2!!
- Developer: Vertigo Gaming
- Publisher: Vertigo Gaming
- Director: David Galindo
- Designer: David Galindo
- Artists: Camille Kuo; Erica Lahaie
- Writers: Nicholas Kraak; Ryan Matejka
- Composer: Jonathan Geer
- Engine: GameMaker Studio
- Platforms: Microsoft Windows, macOS, Linux, PlayStation 4, Nintendo Switch, Xbox One
- Release: Microsoft Windows, OS X, Linux: WW: September 13, 2017; PlayStation 4: WW: December 18, 2018; Nintendo Switch, Xbox One: WW: April 10, 2019
- Genre: Simulation
- Modes: Single-player, local cooperative

Cook, Serve, Delicious! 2 (stylized as Cook, Serve, Delicious! 2!!) is a restaurant simulation game released in 2017, developed and published by Vertigo Gaming for PC, and Mac. The game was released on September 13, 2017, for PC and Mac through Steam and Good Old Games, for the PlayStation 4 on December 18, 2018, and for the Nintendo Switch and Xbox One on April 10, 2019. It is the sequel to Cook, Serve, Delicious!.

Another sequel, Cook, Serve, Delicious! 3, was released in October 2020.

== Gameplay ==
As with the original game, Cook, Serve, Delicious! 2!! has the player act as the chef and principal operator for a small restaurant. Over the course of a day, including periods of high activity, the player must cook requested orders and perform various cleanup and sanitary tasks within a limited amount of time. Most of these require the player to press controller buttons or type specific keys on a keyboard to match a specific sequence of cooking or cleaning, or to match specific order requests. Often, a player may need to start an order and wait for it to finish cooking before completing the remaining steps; during this, they can switch to any of the other pending steps and complete those as needed. Doing all the steps correctly and on time helps the player's score, while making mistakes can harm the restaurant's reputation. As the player completes each day, they earn in-game money that can be used to buy new recipes to add to the menu; part of the metagame is to continue to vary the restaurant's menu to draw in new customers, thus requiring a wide array of recipes.

Cook, Serve, Delicious! 2!! has a number of new or improved gameplay mechanics which differentiates it from the original. The game greatly expands the quantity of foods that can be cooked, increasing from 30 dishes, to over 180. Cook, Serve, Delicious! 2 allows players to decorate and update their own restaurant with a variety of art, wallpapers and other furniture. The new installment also splits food into three different types: Entrees, Sides and Drinks. Sides are only ordered if they are pre-prepared in a Holding Station, and several drinks are now self-served. Entrees have stayed the same in gameplay, although some entrees like French Toast require use of the Holding Stations and cannot be made to order.

Cook, Serve, Delicious! 2 also introduces a Chef for Hire system; which allows the player to work at over thirty restaurants, each with its own theme and menu, and a new local co-op game mode. The game also introduces the previously mentioned Holding Stations, which allows for food to be pre-prepared before customers arrive. The game has also received patches, including options that were originally removed from CSD, being reintroduced into the game. The Iron Cook and Catering events have been removed.

== Release ==
Originally, Cook, Serve, Delicious! 2!! was scheduled for release in August 2017 for Steam, however the game was released a month later. It was released for PlayStation 4 on December 18, 2018; and on Nintendo Switch and Xbox One on April 10, 2019.

== Reception ==
Review Score

Aggregate scores
| Aggregator | Score |
|---|---|
| Metacritic | 62% |
| OpenCritic | 81% recommend |

Review score
| Publication | Score |
|---|---|
| GamesMaster UK | 45% |

Cook, Serve, Delicious! 2 received "mixed or average" reviews from critics, according to the review aggregation website Metacritic. Fellow review aggregator OpenCritic assessed that the game received strong approval, being recommended by 81% of critics.

Gita Jackson of Kotaku said the game was "quite exhilarating" despite making them "stressed" due to the "beautiful" looking food, and said it was an achievement that the game "washe[d] away all [their] frustration". However, GamesMaster UK were "baffled" by the game, and could not see why the game would be popular.
