= Toast Time =

2013 video game

- Developer: Force Of Habit
- Publisher: Force Of Habit
- Platforms: Linux, OS X, Windows, Android, iOS
- Release: Android; 5 September 2013; iOS; 6 February 2014; Windows, macOS, Linux; 27 August 2014
- Genre: Shooter

Toast Time is a shoot-em-up developed by United Kingdom-based developer Force Of Habit. It was self-published for Android in 2013 and released for iOS in 2014. Ports to Microsoft Windows, macOS, and Linux were released later in 2014.

== Gameplay ==
Toast Time is a shoot-em-up, with tower defence elements and physics puzzles mixed in. Players are tasked with defending an alarm clock by firing bread and breakfast-based items from the protagonist, TERRY the toaster.

== Reception ==
Reception

Aggregate score
Aggregator	Score
Metacritic	81/100 (7 reviews)

Review scores
Publication	Score
Hardcore Gamer	2.5/5
Pocket Gamer	3.5/5
TouchArcade	5/5

Chris Carter from TouchArcade said "Some games just click the moment you boot them up. They ooze charm at every turn, forcing you to pay attention and stay glued to the screen (...) Toast Time was just that type of experience — and it's pure gaming bliss", giving the game a score of 5/5.

In a 3.5/5 star review, Mike Rose from Pocket Gamer wrote, "It's the inherent fiddliness of Toast Time that saps some of the fun out of the game," but also that "Some players will be able to overlook many of Toast Time''s issues, though, due to the game's incredible style.".

In a 2/5 review of the PC version, Hardcore Gamer wrote, "Toast Time is fun, but shallow. It controls fine with a mouse, but is best experienced on mobile devices, as its phone-sized playing area just doesn't feel right on a monitor."

Toby Moses from The Guardian said "The lovely, pixelated graphics suit the tongue-in-cheek tone, but it's by no means a simple affair—there is a challenge here..."

Toast Time won the "Best Art Design" category in the 2014 Intel Level Up Game Developer Contest.
