= Auditorium (video game) =

2008 music-based puzzle game

- Auditorium's web demo opens with a symphonic title screen.
- Developer: Cipher Prime
- Engine: Unity
- Platforms: Adobe Flash, Windows/Mac OS X (Steam), iOS, PlayStation 3, PlayStation Portable
- Release: April 2008
- Genres: Puzzle, strategy
- Mode: Single-player

Auditorium is a music-based puzzle game developed by Philadelphia-based studio Cipher Prime. Originally released as a Flash game in April 2008, Auditorium was later released for iOS devices and then the PlayStation 3 and PSP in 2010. It was also released in 2012 for PC and Mac OS X. In 2012, Cipher Prime launched a successful Kickstarter campaign for a sequel to Auditorium, titled Auditorium 2: Duet. However, on January 11, 2017, Cipher Prime announced to their Kickstarter backers that the game was cancelled.

== Gameplay ==
In Auditorium, the player uses various game mechanics to bend streams of light particles to fill audio containers. As each of the audio containers is filled, an audio channel introducing an instrument or sound is added to the game's music. In most levels, the audio containers are a variety of colors which the particle stream must match in order to fill it. The player changes the color of the stream by manipulating it over fixed areas of the level which dye the particles as they pass through them. The goal of each level is to direct and split the stream in such a way that each audio container is filled simultaneously, revealing the level's full soundtrack.

A variety of control points are available to the player, each of which modifies the trajectory of the particle stream in a certain way. In each level, the player is given a set selection of control points which they place in certain positions in the level. These controls include:

- The Directional Control accelerates the particle stream toward a set direction.
- The Attraction Control attracts the particle stream towards it.
- The Repulsion Control repels the particle stream away from it.
- The Rabbit Control energizes the particles, increasing their speed.
- The Deflect Control reflects the particles along a straight line following the angle which the player can adjust to change direction.

With the exception of the Deflect Control, the player can also adjust the strength of each control by changing its size.

Auditorium screenshot

Some levels also contain obstacles which affect the trajectory of the particle stream. The player cannot interact with obstacles so must instead use the tools available to overcome them in some way. These obstacles include:

- Dividers split the particle stream in two.
- Blackholes attract and destroy particles which touch them but can also be used strategically in a similar way to the Attraction Control.
- Portals provide a connection between two points in a level. Particles that enter one portal leave the corresponding portal at the same speed and angle that they entered.

== Platforms ==
The first Flash version of Auditorium was released on PC in April 2008. An EA-published iOS port was released in December 2009. The free game includes five acts with further acts available to purchase in-game.

In November 2009 it was announced that Auditorium would be released for the PlayStation 3 and PSP as a downloadable title from the PlayStation Store. The PlayStation 3 version supports stereoscopic 3D gameplay and utilizes the PlayStation Move motion controller. The console version of the game was released in November 2010. An Xbox 360 version was also announced, to be released in the Xbox Live Arcade.

On February 29, 2012, The game was also released on the Steam store for Microsoft Windows and Mac OS X.

== Reception ==
Auditorium received generally positive reviews, gaining an aggregate review score on Metacritic of 80 for the iOS version and 79 on PS3.
