= Duskers =

2016 video game

- Developer: Misfits Attic
- Publisher: Misfits Attic
- Platforms: Linux, OS X, Windows
- Release: WW: May 18, 2016
- Genre: Strategy
- Mode: Single-player

Duskers is a strategy video game by independent developer Misfits Attic. It was released on May 18, 2016, for Linux, OS X, and Microsoft Windows.

== Gameplay ==
In Duskers, players assume the role of a drone operator, hopping between derelict ships to salvage scrap metal, which can be used to repair and upgrade drones and components; Fuel, which is required to move between ships; Other drones which can be recovered or looted for upgrades and so on. The game is divided into two layers: The "metagame" in which the player can configure, manage, repair and upgrade their drones and components, as well as review their fuel and resource statuses and apply salvaged upgrades to their ship. In this layer, the player decides which derelict to travel to and board next, or whether to jump to another system.

When the player boards a ship, their drones are deployed in the airlock/cargo-bay connecting their ship and the derelict. The player can then directly control each of up to 4 drones, or issue orders via a command line interface. For example, entering "Nav(igate) 1 R2" will have Drone 1 navigate to Room 2. On board the derelicts there are several hazards - Environmental dangers such as radiation leaks, and various hostile life forms and robots. The core gameplay revolves around navigating around these hazards, or in the case of enemies, luring them into other rooms, or otherwise leveraging the abilities of the drones to gain access to salvage as much as possible.

Each derelict may also contain interfaces, allowing the player to activate and deactivate sentry turrets, read crew logs and scan or survey the ship. Scrap metal is the primary currency of the game, and there are no limitations on salvaging it. Disabled drones and ship upgrades must be towed through the airlock to be retrieved.

Drones and their components will become worn through usage and damage, which contributes to their chance of failure, and can be repaired with scrap. As the drone itself is damaged, its performance may degrade. The game ends when all drones are broken, the player will have to reset and everything goes back to square one, except for all the accumulated stats - like the amount of resources they looted, the number of enemies encountered etc - and the collected crew logs.

== Story ==
The players awakens from cryogenic sleep only to find the human race, which had colonized the entire known universe, has mysteriously disappeared, only leaving behind derelict starships and space stations scattered throughout the cosmos. Determined to find out what happened to humanity, the player takes their ship and small fleet of drones to investigate derelict ships, both to scavenge for supplies as well as search for clues of what happened to humanity. As they investigate, the player will find that there are numerous possible theories of humanity's destruction, such as an AI rebellion, hostile alien invasion, the spread of an incurable plague, or the possibility the player is a time traveler sent to the future to investigate humanity's extinction in hopes of finding a way to avert it.

Ultimately, the game has no conclusive ending with the player eventually dying or running out of resources, leaving the player to determine for themselves what happened to humanity.

== Reception ==
=== Accolades ===
Duskers won the award for "Best Other Game" at Intel Level Up 2016.
