= Duet (video game) =

2013 action video game

- Developer: Kumobius
- Publisher: Kumobius
- Producer: Tom Greenaway
- Designers: Ivan Neeson, Tom Greenaway, James Greenaway
- Programmers: Ivan Neeson, Tom Greenaway
- Artist: James Greenaway
- Writer: Tom Greenaway
- Composer: Tim Shiel
- Platforms: iOS, Android, Linux, OS X, Windows
- Release: 10 October 2013
- Genre: Action

Duet is a 2013 action game by Australian game developer Kumobius for iOS and Android. Players control two coloured orbs, guiding them to avoid incoming obstacles. Its Android version was first released as a part of Humble Mobile Bundle 6.

== Gameplay ==
The player rotates a circular track with two coloured orbs, guiding the balls to avoid incoming obstacles. The level is reset once an orb crashes into an obstacle. It's required to keep both orbs intact to pass a level. The names of the levels and the game's story are inspired by the stages of grief from the Kübler-Ross model.

== Reception ==
The game has gathered mixed to positive reviews from critics. As of August 2014, Metacritic lists a score of 79 for the game, a rating of "Generally favorable reviews". Duet is also listed a score of 80.00% on GameRankings. Critics praise Duet for its controls and design, yet noting its notorious difficulty. It is rated 4.9/5 on Apple's App Store, and 4.7/5 on Google's Play Store. Duet is also rated 9/10 on Steam. It was featured in The New Yorker's Best, Most Elegant iPhone Games of the Year 2013 and in Kotaku's Mobile Game of the Year 2013.

The game has been downloaded by more than 20 million people around the world.

=== Accolades ===
Duet won the awards for "Game of the Year", "Best Action Game" and "Best Sound" at Intel Level Up 2014.

== Soundtrack ==
The soundtrack of Duet is available independently on several music streaming platforms including Spotify and iTunes music. In 2015, Tim Shiel performed the Duet soundtrack live accompanied by the Queensland Symphony Orchestra.
