= Hamlet (video game) =

2010 video game

Hamlet or the Last Game without MMORPG Features, Shaders and Product Placement
- Developer: Denis Galanin
- Publishers: Denis Galanin; Big Fish Games (iOS); Alawar Entertainment (Android)
- Engine: Wintermute Engine
- Platforms: Microsoft Windows, iOS, Android
- Release: Windows: WW: 8 April 2010; iOS: WW: 20 January 2011; Android: WW: 1 April 2012
- Genres: Adventure, puzzle
- Mode: Single-player

Hamlet or the Last Game without MMORPG Features, Shaders and Product Placement (Russian: Гамлет, или последняя игра без MMORPG-элементов, шейдеров и рекламы, also known as Hamlet on Android and Hamlet! on iOS) is an indie adventure game based on William Shakespeare's Hamlet. It was developed and published by indie game developer Denis Galanin.

== Plot ==
The game begins by setting up a version of Hamlet rather different from the original, in which Prince Hamlet (a swashbuckling hero) returns to find Claudius and Polonius locking up Ophelia in attempts to marry Ophelia to Claudius. Just as Hamlet is about to run in to save her, a man from the future falls out of the sky in his time machine and lands on his head, incapacitating him. The man then goes to save Ophelia. He first enters Polonius's house. Polonius turns out to be a shriveled, alien-like creature obsessed with chemistry and the periodic table of the elements. The time traveler kills Polonius, but in the process drops Ophelia into a well. When he dives down to rescue her, both are swallowed by a giant fish. With the help of an elderly man living in the fish's stomach, the two escape and surface in the moat outside of Claudius' castle. Claudius turns out to be a wannabe rock god. The player ruins his guitar solo (Claudius discards the guitar, which hits the old man from the fish and causes him to drown) and then causes a potion he is brewing to explode, draining most of his health. Before Claudius can be finished, however, he calls the guard, who lock Ophelia back up and put the time traveler on a ship to be thrown overboard while out to sea. The time traveler escapes confinement and, by manipulating a giant octopus who attacks the ship, defeats its captains, Rosencrantz and Guildenstern. He then pilots the ship back to land.

The time traveler sneaks back into Elsinore Castle. However, he encounters Laertes, a giant who Claudius had sent to kill the traveler while he fled with Ophelia. The traveler manages to grab on to the tail of Claudius's fleeing horse. Arriving at Claudius's secret lair, the traveler opens numerous doors to get inside, but trap kills him. He is able to resurrect from the afterlife and enters the lair. Turning Claudius's death machine against him, the traveler rescues Ophelia, reunites her with a heavily bandaged Hamlet, and flies off in his time machine. The ending teases a sequel based on Romeo and Juliet.

== Gameplay ==
The player interacts with the world with simple point and click interface directing a small hero. The goal of Hamlet is to solve a series of puzzles and brain teasers. The puzzles are sequentially linked forming an adventure story. The game contains no inventory or dialogue, and the solving of puzzles mainly consists of clicking onscreen elements in the correct order. Solving a puzzle will immediately transport the player character to the next screen.

== Development ==
The Microsoft Windows version of Hamlet was developed over a period of eight months, by Denis Galanin, also known as mif2000.

== Reception ==
Reception

Aggregate scores
Aggregator	Score
GameRankings	PC: 67% iOS: 70%
Metacritic	iOS: 72/100
OpenCritic	75/100

Review scores
Publication	Score
Eurogamer	7/10
IGN	7.5/10
Pocket Gamer	6/10

Hamlet has received mixed to positive reviews. The game won the award for the Best iOS Game from The Mac Life Awards at Macworld Expo 2011. Google Play Store included Hamlet on the list of Games We Love: Best Games of 2012. Split Sider included the game on the list of The 10 Funniest Video Games of 2010 and Jay is Games included Hamlet on the list of Best Downloadable Adventure Games of 2010. In 2024, Game Rant included the game on the list of the 10 Best Games Based On Shakespeare’s Plays.

== See also ==
- The Franz Kafka Videogame
