= Forced =

2013 video game

- Developer: BetaDwarf
- Publisher: BetaDwarf
- Director: Steffen Kabbelgaard
- Engine: Unity
- Platforms: Microsoft Windows; OS X Linux; PlayStation 4 Wii U Xbox One
- Release: October 24, 2013
- Genre: Action role-playing
- Modes: Single-player, multiplayer

Forced is a single-player and co-op action role-playing game developed by BetaDwarf, released in October 2013 for Windows, OS X and Linux through the Steam platform as well as Wii U. It is about gladiators fighting for their freedom in a fantasy arena where they are assisted by a spirit-like character called Balfus. Gameplay consists of selecting a weapon class and abilities to combat the various enemies of each arena, while solving puzzles using the help of Balfus. BetaDwarf was formed by a small group of students in 2011, who began developing the game in an unused classroom in Aalborg University – Copenhagen, Denmark. They were removed months later and launched a successful Kickstarter campaign involving an Imgur picture which documented their progress. Forced received moderate to favorable reviews with most critics praising its competitive gameplay and puzzle-system. The game's weak plot, technical glitches and excess difficulty were the negative highlights. It won the Intel Level Up 2013 award and BetaDwarf received the Danish Developer Of The Year (2013) for it.

== Gameplay ==
Forced is an action role-playing game having a top-down view for up to four players in the combat arena. Players have to select a weapon, which has 16 unlockable abilities each, similar to a character class. Though single player mode is also available, the game is mostly about cooperative gameplay by selecting a weapon class and abilities which complement the other players', while combating demons of various sizes and solving environmental puzzles—using a will-o-wisp-like companion called Balfus the Spirit Mentor.

The Mark combat system and the interaction with Balfus are the special features in Forced. Here one player fights three enemies (image cropped and HUD not visible), with each hit giving them marks (in white, above their health bars). The player ordered Balfus (top-left) to move over the shrine nearby, causing him to have a green circular healing aura.

There are four weapon classes: the Storm Bow, the Volcanic Hammer, the Spirit Knives, and the Frost Shield; each have the tactical roles of a long range attacker, slow melee attacker, fast melee attacker and a tank respectively. The active and passive abilities available for each class allow some form of customization. The weapon class and selected abilities (which also have cooldowns) can be changed before the start of any arena level. Each player must choose a different weapon class. Balfus can be made to interact with the environment's spiritual plane by ordering him to activate or trigger props like healing pedestals or set off a stunning blast from traps. He can travel with the characters, float in space or can be called to their location. Good positioning and communication will help the players use Balfus efficiently; the need to do this while facing waves of enemies, makes the game more challenging.

Gems are rewarded after the completion of each arena trial. They can be used to enhance the weapons by unlocking more ability slots and new abilities at regular intervals. Each trial contains three gems as a reward. The first requires completion, the second is a specific challenge and the third is a time trial. If the arena boss is too difficult, it is possible to complete all these challenges to earn extra gems. Forced has a Mark Combat System, where weapons cause marks on the enemies. A greater number of marks causes certain abilities to have better effects, thus making it more effective to hit a group of enemies a few times before using an ability, rather than using it at the start. Though the difficulty increases in proportion to the number of players and sharing Balfus needs communication between them, multiplayer is easier and lets the player focus on specific abilities and tactical roles instead of being forced to cover every possibility in single player; also, if a player dies, the trial can be completed as long as another survives till the end.

== Plot ==
The players are cast as slaves who are forced to fight in a fantasy gladiator arena, which is the reason for the game title. The slaves are from a village where people are bred solely to be gladiators and fight for the pleasure of demon types to win their freedom. The players have the help of Balfus, a Spirit Mentor, and need to overcome the challenges and defeat the guardians of each arena. Spirit Mentors guide gladiators through the arena and Balfus is revealed to have done so for previous dead gladiators before the player. Balfus remains the source of drama since the protagonists are silent throughout the game and the antagonists do not go beyond taunting them.

In their first arena fight, they defeat the guardian called "Wrathhoof", who refuses to accept defeat to let them pass to the next arena. Despite Balfus' warning that this would be against the rules, Wrathhoof continues to attack the players who then kill him. The players and Balfus try to keep this murder of a guardian a secret and embark to the next arena, where the next guardian Slarth, discovers what they did. Slarth and the next guardian Graw are revealed to be former gladiators themselves and Balfus, their mentor. The players then defeat and kill Slarth. On killing Graw, Balfus decides to end this gladiator event by killing the remaining guardian Mordar and the final guardian called "The Master".

== Development ==
Forced uses the Unity engine. BetaDwarf was formed by a small group of students in 2010, who moved into an unused classroom in Aalborg University – Copenhagen, Denmark and began developing the game. After seven months, the university discovered them when a lecturer accidentally walked into the room. They were removed and made a successful Kickstarter campaign involving a picture on Imgur, which described their progress as a team; they were then able to set up their office in Copenhagen. Steffen Kabbelgaard, Game Director and CEO of BetaDwarf, credited the 1996 videogame Crash Bandicoot as an inspiration for the campaigns and gem rewards in Forced. A demo of the game was available in the 2013 Gamescom and PAX Prime. A beta version of Forced was initially released on Steam Early Access for Windows, OS X and Linux in the same year. Its full release was on October 24, 2013, which was also for Wii U. On March 19, 2014, BetaDwarf announced that the game would be available on Xbox One.

== Reception ==
Reception

Aggregate scores
Aggregator	Score
GameRankings	72
Metacritic	72

Review scores
Publication	Score
GameSpot	5/10
Hardcore Gamer	4/5
RPGamer	3/5
RPGFan	80%
NZGamer.com	8.6/10

Forced won the Intel Level Up 2013 award and BetaDwarf received the Danish Developer Of The Year at the 2013 Spilprisen game awards held by the Danish Producers Association. It received moderate to favorable reviews. Brittany Vincent of Hardcore Gamer gave the game a 4/5, calling it "a gleeful return to form for cooperative play." Jim Rossignol from Rock, Paper, Shotgun called it a "competently produced game" but said that it "simply lacks flair, and combined with the slightly awkward mechanics in co-op play, means it never feels wholly convincing." Lena LeRay from IndieGames.com felt the voice acting was mediocre and acknowledged the lack of depth in the plot but said that the "engaging gameplay" compensated for it. Bob Richardson from RPGFan also highlighted these issues in addition to various technical glitches in multiplayer. Richardson praised the gameplay, the puzzle system and the skill customization, giving the game 80% rating. He said, "Forced is purely an intrinsic experience: defeat is the result of lack of cooperation and skill, and victory is directly related to teamwork, communication, and aptitude."

Zach Welhouse from RPGamer gave it a 3/5 calling the combat "complex and rewarding" and multiplayer "a good balance of tactics and adrenaline." He also praised the music, Balfus's character and called the puzzle-solving system "unique" but noted the bare plot and game difficulty as its negative highlights. Welhouse commented, "The sheer number of ways to die makes it difficult to tell how much of Forced is unfair and how much is a series of lessons in avoiding dangerous situations to unlock a new ability is a compelling system for squeezing the most effort out of a player." Jason Venter from GameSpot, gave it 5/10 and said, "It's a challenging game with built-in reasons to revisit familiar areas, but it's also too demanding for its own good, and the results are more frustrating than satisfying." Mike Gunn from NZGamer.com gave it 8.6/10 and said, "Such a simple game, but one with a lot of tactical and strategic depth."
