= Cipher Prime =

American video game developer

- Type: Private
- Industry: Video games
- Founded: 2008
- Founder: William "BJ" Stallwood, Dain Saint
- Headquarters: Philadelphia, Pennsylvania, USA
- Products: Auditorium, Fractal, Pulse, Splice, Shimsham, Intake, Monster Want Burger, Tailwind: Prologue, Jawns, Lineweight
- Services: Video game development
- Website: Official site

Cipher Prime is an independent video game development studio based in Philadelphia and founded in 2008. It developed titles including Auditorium (2008), Fractal (2010), and Splice (2012).

== History ==
On February 27, 2012, Cipher Prime launched a Kickstarter campaign to fund a sequel to Auditorium titled Auditorium 2: Duet. The Kickstarter campaign successfully met its funding goal. In 2014, an early development version of Auditorium 2: Duet was available to play through the Indie Media Exchange showcase at SIGGRAPH in Vancouver. However, after years of development, Auditorium 2: Duet would ultimately be canceled in 2017.

In 2012, Cipher Prime also began hosting weekly Dev Nights and monthly Game Jams on Thursday nights from their office in Old City Philadelphia, which they made open to the public. In 2013, they enlarged their office to create the Philly Game Forge, a coworking space for independent game developers. For three years, the Philly Game Forge would serve as a hub for game development, hosting regular events such as weekly Dev Nights and monthly game jams, and seeing the success of numerous game releases before the Game Forge would ultimately close its doors on June 30th, 2016.

Several Cipher Prime games have been featured in Humble Bundles.

== List of video games ==
Year	Title	Platform
2008	Auditorium	Flash, iOS, PlayStation 3, PSP
2010	Fractal	Windows, Mac, Linux, Android, iPad
2011	Pulse	Android tablets, iPad
2012	Splice	Windows, Mac, Linux, Android, iPad, PlayStation 3, PlayStation 4
2013	Shimsham	Windows, Mac
2013	Intake	Windows, Mac, iPad
2015	Monster Want Burger	Windows, Mac, iOS
2016	Tailwind: Prologue	Windows, Mac
2017	Jawns	Windows, Mac, Web
2020	Lineweight	Android, iOS
