= Wolfgang Engel =

German video game designer

- Occupations: Writer and designer
- Notable work: ShaderX, GPU Pro, and GPU Zen books series
- Title: CEO of Confetti

Wolfgang Friedrich Engel is a GPU and Graphics Programmer. He is the founder and CEO of The Forge Interactive. Previously, he also worked as the Lead Graphics Programmer for Rockstar Games. He is also the founder and editor of ShaderX, GPU Pro, and GPU Zen books series.

== Career ==
As a developer, Engel has developed videogames in addition to games for the television series Wetten, dass..?. He was the Lead Graphics Programmer at Rockstar Games, where he led the graphics development of the RAGE engine. During his time at Rockstar he contributed to Rockstar Games franchises including Midnight Club, Red Dead Redemption, and Grand Theft Auto. At that time Engel also developed the Oolong gaming engine for iPhone, that eventually shipped about a hundred games. In 2008 Engel introduced light pre-pass rendering as a method of deferred shading variant in the development of videogame graphics, and is known as an expert in shader programming.

Engel then founded Confetti Interactive and Confetti Games in 2009, and is its CEO. Confetti is a think-tank for real-time graphics research in the videogame and movie industry, graphics tools developer, and programming services company. Tools Engel has helped develop for the company include Aura, a global illumination system; Ephemeris, a skybox/skydome system; and PixelPuzzle, a Post FX pipeline system. As a part of his role with Confetti, Engel works with external clients, and provides consultations to other game developers. Confetti contributed to games including Tomb Raider, Battlefield 4, Murdered Soul Suspect, Star Citizen, Dirt 4, Vainglory, Transistor, Call of Duty Black Ops 3, Battlefield 1, Mafia 3, Quake Champions, and Phyre.

== Writing ==
Engel has written or edited more than 20 books on graphics software development in use by the videogame industry, in line with contemporary techniques and practices. The book series he has authored include the ShaderX, GPU Pro, and GPU Zen books series. The ShaderX4 book was awarded the Game Developer Front Line prize in 2006. His books have also included edited collections of pieces by other industry experts and designers, and Engel has also been technical editor to books published by other authors on the same subject matter. Engel also writes articles for developer magazines and game tutorials for videogame-oriented websites. Engel has also spoken at public conferences regarding various techniques in videogame creation and is a faculty member and advisor to the Academy of Game Entertainment Technology.
