= Muse Games =

American video game development studio

Muse Games Corp.
- Company type: Private company
- Industry: Video game development
- Founded: 2008; 17 years ago
- Founder: Howard Tsao
- Headquarters: New York City
- Website: musegames.com

Muse Games is an American indie video game developer based in New York City. They are best known as the team behind Guns of Icarus Online, and its subsequent companion game Guns of Icarus Alliance. Their newest game, Wildmender, released September 2023.

== Games developed ==
Year	Title	Platform(s)	Publisher
2010	Flight of the Icarus	Windows, macOS	Self Published
2011	CreaVures	Windows, macOS, iOS	Self Published
2012	Guns of Icarus Online	Windows, macOS, Linux, PS4	Self Published
2019	Hamsterdam	iOS, Android, Nintendo Switch, Windows, macOS	Self Published
2020	Embr	Windows, Stadia, Xbox, PlayStation, Nintendo Switch	Curve Digital
2023	Wildmender	Windows, PS5, Xbox	Kwalee
Expected 2026	Stars of Icarus	Windows	Self Published
