= Fractal (video game) =

2010 video game

- Developer: Cipher Prime
- Engine: Unity
- Platforms: Microsoft Windows, OS X, Linux, iOS, Android
- Release: OS X, Windows; May 26, 2010 iOS; August 18, 2011; Android, Linux; June 18, 2013
- Genres: Puzzle, strategy
- Mode: Single-player

Fractal: Make Blooms Not War is a puzzle video game by Cipher Prime. The game involves pushing hexagonal fragments together to form large hexagons and chain reactions.

Fractal was released by Cipher Prime via their website on May 26, 2010, for OS X and Microsoft Windows.

== Gameplay ==
Fractal's gameplay revolves around pushing hexagons into seven-hexagon clusters, or "blooms", which earn the player points. Fractal features three gameplay modes, campaign, arcade, and puzzle. In campaign mode, the player progresses by earning enough points to clear each level. Over the course of the thirty-level campaign, the player encounters different kinds of power-up hexagons with special abilities (hexagons that cause explosions, or that destroy all adjacent hexagons) that help the player earn points. In arcade mode, the player works toward setting a high score by surviving for as long as possible. In the fifty-level puzzle mode, the player is tasked with completing objectives in a limited number of moves. Each series of challenges in puzzle mode (Koch, Menger, Sierpinski, Julia, Mandelbrot, and Dragon) is named after a different fractal set.

== Reception ==
The game has a Metacritic score of 84% based on 4 critic reviews.
