= MouseCraft =

2014 video game

- Developer: Crunching Koalas
- Publisher: Crunching Koalas
- Platforms: Ouya; PlayStation 3; PlayStation 4; PlayStation Vita; Windows; Nintendo Switch; Xbox One
- Release: Ouya, PS3, PS4, Vita, Windows; 8 July 2014; Nintendo Switch; 27 February 2020; Xbox One; 20 January 2022
- Genre: Adventure

MouseCraft is a 3D adventure video game developed and published by Poland-based game studio Crunching Koalas. The game was released on 8 July 2014 for Ouya, PlayStation 3, PlayStation 4, PlayStation Vita, and Microsoft Windows. A port for Nintendo Switch was released on 27 February 2020 and Xbox One on 20 January 2022.

== Gameplay ==
MouseCraft has 80 levels. Players can create their own maps with a level editor.

== Reception ==
Reception

Aggregate score
Aggregator	Score
Metacritic	PS4: 72/100 (Note: Score based on 12 reviews.); VITA: 68/100 (Note: Score based on 4 reviews.); PC: 72/100 (Note: Score based on 16 reviews.); NS: 77/100 (Note: Score based on 6 reviews.); XONE: 82/100 (Note: Score based on 4 reviews.)

Review scores
Publication	Score
Destructoid	7/10
Eurogamer	6/10
Game Informer	8/10
GameRevolution	5/10
GameSpot	6/10
Hardcore Gamer	4/5
IGN	7.7/10
Joystiq	3.5/5
PC Gamer (US)	65/100
Push Square	8/10

MouseCraft received "mixed or average reviews" for most platforms according to review aggregator Metacritic; the Nintendo Switch and Xbox One versions received "generally favorable reviews".
