= Super Win the Game =

2014 action role-playing video game

- Developer: Minor Key Games
- Publisher: Minor Key Games
- Producer: J. Kyle Pittman
- Composer: J. Kyle Pittman
- Engine: Unity
- Platforms: Microsoft Windows; macOS; Linux
- Release: October 1, 2014
- Genre: Action role-playing
- Mode: Single-player

Super Win the Game is an action role-playing video game released on October 1, 2014 by American studio Minor Key Games. The game is a sequel to the studio's prior work, You Have to Win the Game, and is a homage to Zelda II: The Adventure of Link. While critically praised, the game received lackluster sales, prompting its lead developer Kyle Pittman to call it a "total failure".

== Gameplay and story ==
Super Win the Game is strictly platform-based, with the player character having no offensive abilities against enemies, unlike The Adventure of Link. Like The Adventure of Link, the player has access to a map screen which contains villages with NPCs, dungeons with obstacles to overcome and abilities inside, and other secrets. In the game, the player character, known as "Wayfarer", is tasked with collecting pieces of the Hollow King's heart, which has been broken by an evil wizard. In order to gather these pieces and confront the wizard, the player must collect several upgrades and new abilities, which unlock new areas and sections of levels in a Metroidvania format. Throughout the game, the player character can speak with creatures known as Arcadians, who claim to be from the stars. After returning the king's heart, the world is saved from the Hollow King's rule and peace is restored. An Arcadian asks the player character if they are ready to leave. Accepting his offer restarts the game from its prologue, but with no progress erased.

== Reception and sales ==
Super Win the Game was received positively by critics. Tom Sykes of PC Gamer praised the CRT simulation visuals as well as its open-ended gameplay. Angelo D'Argenio of GameCrate considered it "a game about secrets", comparing it to The Legend of Zelda: Breath of the Wild.

Although met with positive reception, Super Win the Game sold only 850 units in its first month after release, which lead developer Kyle Pittman called "a complete and total failure". Following this, Pittman declared that he no longer wished to continue making pixel art platformers in the vein of Super Win the Game.
