= Subscription box =

Recurring delivery of niche physical products

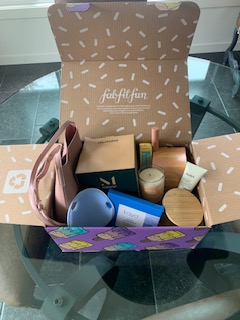
Typical subscription box opened to show contents

Subscription boxes are a recurring delivery of niche products as part of a marketing strategy and a method of product distribution. Subscription boxes are used by subscription-based ecommerce businesses, referred to as "subcom" for short, which follow a subscription business model. They target a wide range of customers and cater to a variety of specific needs and interests. It is estimated that there are 400 to 600 different kinds of subscription boxes in the United States alone and more overseas. Subscriptions vary in both cost and frequency, making them more accessible to a greater range of customers with different socioeconomic backgrounds. Subscription boxes tend to range from $10 to $100 per box.

== History and appeal ==
According to TechCrunch, Birchbox led the subscription box trend with its 2010 launch. Birchbox inspired the launch of other subscription boxes in the early 2010s.

Part of the appeal of subscription boxes is that consumers discover products they might not have otherwise. This allows customers to try products and brands risk-free. The increased exposure to new products helps customers discover optimal products for their preferences and needs. While only some subscription boxes have return options, there are places online to exchange unwanted items.

The subscription box industry became more prominently known when Unilever acquired Dollar Shave Club in 2016, another well-known entity in this space.

== Business costs ==
Shipping costs and the need to constantly innovate present challenges to retailers offering the subscription service.

== See also ==
- Meal kit
- Meals on wheels
- Vegetable box scheme
- Wine club
