= Lists of PlayStation Store games =

Lists of PlayStation Store games cover video games that can be downloaded from the online PlayStation Store. The lists are organized by type of video game console and by region.

== PS one Classics ==
- Lists of PS one Classics
  - List of PS one Classics (Japan)
  - List of PS one Classics (North America)
  - List of PS one Classics (PAL region)

== Playstation 2 ==
- Lists of downloadable PlayStation 2 games

== PlayStation 3 ==
- List of PlayStation 3 games (A–C)
- List of PlayStation 3 games (D–I)
- List of PlayStation 3 games (J–P)
- List of PlayStation 3 games (Q–Z)

== PlayStation 4 ==
- List of PlayStation 4 games

== PlayStation 5 ==
- List of PlayStation 5 games

== Playstation Portable ==
- List of downloadable PlayStation Portable games
- List of PlayStation minis

== Playstation Vita ==
- Lists of PlayStation Vita games (Note: PSP was a handheld console) (Note: Includes games from Playstation Online service PlayStation Network which offer games for digital download only.)
  - List of PlayStation Vita games (A–D)
  - List of PlayStation Vita games (E–H)
  - List of PlayStation Vita games (I–L)
  - List of PlayStation Vita games (M–O)
  - List of PlayStation Vita games (P–R)
  - List of PlayStation Vita games (S)
  - List of PlayStation Vita games (T–V)
  - List of PlayStation Vita games (W–Z)

== Other Playstation ==
- List of PlayStation Store TurboGrafx-16 games
- NEOGEO Station
- List of Sony Pictures mobile games
- List of PlayStation Mobile games
