= List of PlayStation Vita games (A–D) =

This is a list of PlayStation Vita games that have been released and distributed at retail via flash storage cartridges or made available for download via the PlayStation Store service.

While the PlayStation Vita features backwards compatibility and streaming services which allow playing games from other platforms, this list only contains games that were developed specifically for the PlayStation Vita console. The following categories of games are not included on this list:

- PlayStation Portable games, available digitally
- PlayStation (PS1) games, available digitally
- TurboGrafx-16 (PC Engine) games, available on multiple Sony platforms
- PlayStation minis, available on multiple Sony platforms
- PlayStation Mobile games, available on multiple Sony platforms and Android devices
- PlayStation 3 and PlayStation 4 games, available via Remote Play or PlayStation Now

This list of games also excludes applications, companion apps for other games, and non-retail games. Games that were announced, but cancelled prior to release, should be added to the list of cancelled PlayStation Vita games instead.

This article lists release dates for North American, European and Japanese regions separately. Physical cartridge games are region free, and can be played on a device from any region. Digitally purchased games and add-ons are tied to the region of the user's PlayStation Network account, and while there are no hardware restrictions on which region of account can be used during initial setup, only a single account can be registered with a device at once.

The PlayStation TV contains very similar hardware to the PlayStation Vita, including a matching cartridge slot for physical games, but not all games can be played on this device. This is controlled by a whitelist of compatible games in the system software, and while this can be modified to increase compatibility by using custom firmware, this article has a column denoting a game's official compatibility with the PlayStation TV.

== Games list (A–D) ==
There are currently 1732 (Note: This number is always up to date by this script.) games across the lists of PlayStation Vita games. The list of games is split across several articles, which can be accessed by clicking the alphabetical groups in parentheses above the main table.

For a chronological list, click the sort button in any of the available region's columns. Games dated December 17, 2011 (Japan), February 15, 2012 (North America), and February 22, 2012 (Europe) are the launch titles of each region respectively.

Title	Genre(s)	Developer(s)	Publisher(s)	Release date			PS TV compat.	Ref.
Title	Genre(s)	Developer(s)	Publisher(s)	North America	Europe	Japan	PS TV compat.	Ref.
&: Sora no Mukō de Saki Masuyō ni	Visual novel	Akatsuki Works	5pb.	Unreleased	Unreleased	Dec 26, 2013	Yes	
@Field	Sports	Sonic Powered	Sonic Powered	Unreleased	Unreleased	Mar 29, 2012	No	
#KillAllZombies	Action	Beatshapers	Beatshapers (NA/EU); Smartphone Labs (JP)	Dec 2, 2016	Dec 2, 2016	Sep 21, 2017	No	
1001 Spikes	Platform	8bits Fanatics	JP: Pikii; WW: Nicalis	Jun 3, 2014	Oct 7, 2015	Nov 27, 2015	Yes	
10 Second Ninja X	Platform	Four Circle Interactive	Curve Digital	Jul 19, 2016	Jul 19, 2016	Unreleased	No	
12-ji no Kane to Cinderella	Otome game	QuinRose	QuinRose	Unreleased	Unreleased	May 21, 2015	Yes	
2013: Infected Wars	Third-person shooter	Action Mobile Games	Action Mobile Games	Mar 24, 2015	Jul 2, 2015	Unreleased	No	
2064: Read Only Memories	Adventure	MidBoss	JP: Playism; WW: MidBoss	Dec 9, 2017	Jan 10, 2018	Apr 5, 2018	Yes	
36 Fragments of Midnight	Platform	Petite Games	Petite Games	Oct 6, 2017	Sep 20, 2017	Unreleased	Yes	
3rd Super Robot Wars Z: Jigoku-hen	Tactical role-playing	B.B. Studio	Bandai Namco Games	Unreleased	Unreleased	Apr 10, 2014	Yes	
3rd Super Robot Wars Z: Rengoku-hen	Tactical role-playing	B.B. Studio	Bandai Namco Games	Unreleased	Unreleased	Apr 2, 2015	Yes	
3rd Super Robot Wars Z: Tengoku-hen	Tactical role-playing	B.B. Studio	Bandai Namco Entertainment	Unreleased	Unreleased	Apr 2, 2015	Yes	
5-nin no Koi Prince: Himitsu no Keiyaku Kekkon	Visual novel	Asgard	Asgard	Unreleased	Unreleased	Jun 25, 2015	No	
7'scarlet	Otome game	Otomate; Toybox	JP: Idea Factory; WW: Aksys Games	May 25, 2018	May 25, 2018	Jul 21, 2016	No	
88 Heroes	Action	Bitmap Bureau	Rising Star Games	Apr 23, 2021	Apr 23, 2021	Apr 23, 2021	No	
99Vidas	Beat 'em up	QuByte Interactive	QuByte Interactive	Jul 18, 2017	Unreleased	Unreleased	Yes	
A-Men	Action-puzzle	Bloober Team	JP: Kemco; WW: Bloober Team	Aug 13, 2013	Feb 22, 2012	Feb 1, 2012	North America only	
A-Men 2	Action-puzzle	Bloober Team	Bloober Team	Nov 5, 2013	Nov 6, 2013	Unreleased	No	
A Hole New World	Platform	Hidden Trap	Hidden Trap	Oct 13, 2019	Oct 13, 2019	Oct 13, 2019	Yes	
A Rose in the Twilight	Adventure, puzzle	Nippon Ichi Software	Nippon Ichi Software	Apr 11, 2017	Apr 14, 2017	Apr 26, 2016	Yes	
A Virus Named TOM	Puzzle	Misfits Attic	Misfits Attic	Apr 5, 2016	Apr 5, 2016	Aug 3, 2016	No	
A Winter's Daydream	Visual novel	ebi-hime	Sometimes You	Oct 8, 2019	Oct 8, 2019	Unreleased	No	
Aabs Animals	Application	Aabs	Aabs	Jul 9, 2013	Sep 11, 2013	Nov 29, 2012	No	
Abunai Koi no Sōsashitsu: Eternal Happiness	Otome game	GignoSystem Japan	Asgard Japan	Unreleased	Unreleased	May 21, 2015	No	
Accel World vs. Sword Art Online	Role-playing	Artdink	Bandai Namco Entertainment	Jul 7, 2017	Jul 7, 2017	Mar 16, 2017	Yes	
Access Denied	Action	Stately Snail	Stately Snail	Dec 16, 2016	Dec 16, 2016	Unreleased	No	
Active Neurons	Action	Sometimes You	Sometimes You	Apr 29, 2020	Apr 29, 2020	Unreleased	No	
Active Soccer 2 DX	Sports	The Fox Software	The Fox Software	Jul 25, 2017	Dec 14, 2016	Unreleased	Yes	
Actual Sunlight	Role-playing	Will O'Neill	WZO Games	Aug 11, 2015	Oct 7, 2015	Unreleased	No	
Adventures of Mana	Role-playing	Square Enix	Square Enix	Jun 28, 2016	Jun 28, 2016	Feb 4, 2016	No	
Adventure Time: The Secret of the Nameless Kingdom	Action-adventure	WayForward Technologies	JP: Bergsala; WW: Little Orbit	Nov 18, 2014	Nov 18, 2014	Dec 16, 2016	Yes	
Aegis of Earth: Protonovus Assault	Tower defense	Acquire	JP: Acquire; NA: Aksys Games; EU: PQube	Mar 15, 2016	Apr 22, 2016	Jul 2, 2015	No	
Aerial Life	Visual novel	Entergram	Entergram	Unreleased	Unreleased	Oct 24, 2019	Yes	
AeternoBlade	Action	CoreCell Technology	Arc System Works	Feb 10, 2015	Feb 4, 2015	Dec 18, 2014	Yes	
Age of Zombies	Action-adventure	Halfbrick Studios; BlitWorks	Halfbrick Studios	Jan 14, 2014	Dec 18, 2013	Mar 23, 2017	No	
Ai Kiss	Visual novel	Giga	Entergram	Unreleased	Unreleased	Sep 24, 2020	Yes	
Air Race Speed	Racing	Qubic Games	Circle Entertainment	Dec 20, 2016	Dec 20, 2016	Unreleased	Yes	
Air	Visual novel	Key	Prototype	Unreleased	Unreleased	Sep 8, 2016	Yes	
Airship Q	Action-adventure; sandbox	Miracle Positive	Cygames; Sony Computer Entertainment	Unreleased	Unreleased	Nov 19, 2015	Yes	
Aiyoku no Eustia: Angel's Blessing	Visual novel	August	Dramatic Create	Unreleased	Unreleased	Jun 26, 2014	Yes	
Akai Suna Ochiru Tsuki	Otome game; Role-playing	Landkarte	Dramatic Create	Unreleased	Unreleased	Mar 10, 2016	Yes	
AKB1/149 Ren'ai Sōsenkyo	Dating sim	Artdink	Bandai Namco Games	Unreleased	Unreleased	Dec 20, 2012	Yes	
Akiba's Beat	Action role-playing	Acquire	JP: Acquire; NA: Xseed Games; EU: PQube	May 16, 2017	May 19, 2017	Apr 27, 2017	No	
Akiba's Trip: Undead & Undressed	Action-adventure	Acquire	JP: Acquire; NA: Marvelous USA; EU: NIS America	Aug 12, 2014	Oct 10, 2014	Nov 7, 2013	Yes	
Alia's Carnival: Sacrament	Visual novel	NanaWind	Dramatic Create	Unreleased	Unreleased	Oct 29, 2015	Yes	
Alien Breed	Action	Team17	Team17	Feb 12, 2013	Feb 6, 2013	Unreleased	Yes	
Alien Shooter	Shooter	Sigma Team	4 Hit	May 19, 2015	Apr 15, 2015	Unreleased	Yes	
Alone with You	Exploration	Benjamin Rivers	Benjamin Rivers	Aug 23, 2016	Aug 23, 2016	Unreleased	No	
Alphaset by POWGI	Puzzle	Lightwood Games	Lightwood Games	Aug 25, 2020	Apr 29, 2020	Unreleased	No	
Alteric	Platform	Goonswarm; Sometimes You	Sometimes You	Oct 11, 2017	Oct 11, 2017	Unreleased	Yes	
Alvastia Chronicles	Role-playing	Kemco	Kemco	Feb 12, 2019	Unreleased	Jan 18, 2019	No	
Amagami EbiKore+	Dating sim, mahjong game	Kadokawa Games	Kadokawa Games	Unreleased	Unreleased	Jan 30, 2014	No	
Amaekata wa Kanojo Nari ni	Visual novel	Giga	Entergram	Unreleased	Unreleased	Oct 26, 2017	Yes	
Amamane	Visual novel	Giga	Entergram	Unreleased	Unreleased	Nov 28, 2019	Yes	
Amatsumi Sora ni! Kumo no Hatate ni	Visual novel	Clochette	Prototype	Unreleased	Unreleased	Sep 17, 2015	No	
Amatsutsumi	Visual novel	Prototype	Prototype	Unreleased	Unreleased	May 17, 2018	No	
The Amazing Spider-Man	Action-adventure	Beenox	Activision	Nov 19, 2013	Nov 22, 2013	Unreleased	Yes	
Amenity's Life	Visual novel	Hooksoft	Piacci	Unreleased	Unreleased	Nov 22, 2017	Yes	
Amnesia Later X Crowd V Edition	Otome game	Otomate; Design Factory	Idea Factory	Unreleased	Unreleased	Oct 16, 2014	Yes	
Amnesia: Memories	Otome game	Otomate; Design Factory	Idea Factory	Aug 25, 2015	Aug 26, 2015	Dec 19, 2013	Yes	
Amnesia World	Otome game	Otomate; Design Factory	Idea Factory	Unreleased	Unreleased	May 22, 2014	Yes	
Amnesia World AR	Application	Otomate; Design Factory	Idea Factory	Unreleased	Unreleased	May 8, 2014	Yes	
Anata no Shikihime Kyouikutan	Action role-playing	Nippon Ichi Software	Nippon Ichi Software	Unreleased	Unreleased	Mar 8, 2018	Yes	
Angelique Retour	Dating sim	Ruby Party	Koei Tecmo	Unreleased	Unreleased	Dec 17, 2015	Yes	
Angry Birds Star Wars	Puzzle	Rovio Entertainment; Exient Entertainment	Activision	Oct 29, 2013	Nov 1, 2013	Unreleased	Yes	
Angry Birds Trilogy	Puzzle	Rovio Entertainment; Exient Entertainment	Activision	Oct 15, 2013	Oct 16, 2013	Unreleased	Yes	
Ano Ko wa Ore kara Hanarenai	Visual novel	Giga	Entergram	Unreleased	Unreleased	Mar 20, 2014	Yes	
Another World: 20th Anniversary Edition	Platform; action-adventure	The Digital Lounge	The Digital Lounge	Jul 8, 2014	Jun 25, 2014	Unreleased	Yes	
Antiquia Lost	Role-playing	Exe Create	Kemco	Sep 5, 2017	Jun 20, 2018	Aug 16, 2017	Yes	
Ao no Kanata no Four Rhythm	Visual novel	Sprite	Piacci	Unreleased	Unreleased	Feb 25, 2016	Yes	
Aoki Tsubasa no Chevalier	Role-playing	Experience Inc.	Experience Inc.	Unreleased	Unreleased	Jul 11, 2019	No	
Aonatsu Line	Visual Novel	Giga	Entergram	Unreleased	Unreleased	Apr 23, 2020	Yes	
Aqua Kitty: Milk Mine Defender DX	Shoot 'em up	Tikipod	JP: Playism; WW: Midboss	Nov 25, 2014	Nov 26, 2014	Mar 23, 2016	Yes	
AR Combat DigiQ: Tomodachi Sensha-tai	Action	Konami	Konami	Unreleased	Unreleased	Dec 17, 2011	No	
Arcana Famiglia: La storia della Arcana Famiglia Ancora	Otome game	HuneX	Comfort	Unreleased	Unreleased	Dec 23, 2015	Yes	
Arcana Heart 3: Love Max!!!!!	Fighting	Examu	EU: NIS America; WW: Arc System Works	Sep 23, 2014	Nov 21, 2014	May 29, 2014	Yes	
Army Corps of Hell	Action	Entersphere	Square Enix	Feb 22, 2012	Feb 22, 2012	Dec 17, 2011	No	
Ar Nosurge Plus	Role-playing	Gust Co. Ltd.	Koei Tecmo	Jul 2, 2015	Jul 1, 2015	Oct 2, 2014	Yes	
Asdivine Dios	Role-playing	EXE Create	Kemco	Jul 2, 2019	Unreleased	Jun 5, 2019	No	
Asdivine Hearts	Role-playing	Kotobuki Solution	Kemco	Jan 10, 2017	Nov 7, 2017	Dec 13, 2016	Yes	
Asdivine Hearts II	Role-playing	Kotobuki Solution	Kemco	Jan 15, 2019	Unreleased	Aug 2, 2019	Yes	
Asdivine Menace	Role-playing	Kotobuki Solution	Kemco	Sep 3, 2019	Unreleased	Dec 18, 2018	Yes	
Asphalt: Injection	Racing	Gameloft	JP: Konami; WW: Ubisoft	Feb 15, 2012	Feb 22, 2012	Dec 17, 2011	No	
Assassin's Creed III: Liberation	Action	Ubisoft Sofia; Ubisoft Milan; Ubisoft Montreal	Ubisoft	Oct 30, 2012	Oct 31, 2012	Nov 15, 2012	No	
Assassin's Creed Chronicles Trilogy Pack	Platform	Climax Studios	Ubisoft	Apr 5, 2016	Apr 5, 2016	Feb 25, 2016	Yes	
Assault Gunners	Action	Artdink	Marvelous AQL	Unreleased	Unreleased	Jun 28, 2012	Yes	
AstralAir no Shiroki Towa: White Eternity	Visual novel	Favorite	Dramatic Create	Unreleased	Unreleased	Sep 22, 2016	Yes	
Astro Aqua Kitty	Shooter	Tikipod Limited	Tikipod Limited	Apr 15, 2021	Apr 15, 2021	May 17, 2021	No	
Atari Flashback Classics	Compilation	AtGames	Atari	Dec 19, 2018	Jan 17, 2019	Unreleased	Yes	
Atelier Ayesha Plus: The Alchemist of Dusk	Role-playing	Gust Co. Ltd.	Koei Tecmo	Jan 13, 2015	Jan 14, 2015	Mar 27, 2014	Yes	
Atelier Escha & Logy Plus: Alchemists of the Dusk Sky	Role-playing	Gust Co. Ltd.	Koei Tecmo	Jan 19, 2016	Jan 20, 2016	Jan 22, 2015	Yes	
Atelier Firis: The Alchemist and the Mysterious Journey	Role-playing	Gust Co. Ltd.	Koei Tecmo	Mar 7, 2017	Mar 10, 2017	Nov 2, 2016	Yes	
Atelier Lydie & Suelle: The Alchemists and the Mysterious Paintings	Role-playing	Gust Co. Ltd.	Koei Tecmo	Unreleased	Unreleased	Dec 21, 2017	Yes	
Atelier Meruru Plus: The Apprentice of Arland	Role-playing	Gust Co. Ltd.	Tecmo Koei	Sep 3, 2013	Sep 4, 2013	Mar 20, 2013	Yes	
Atelier Rorona Plus: The Alchemist of Arland	Role-playing	Gust Co. Ltd.	Tecmo Koei	Jul 22, 2014	Jul 2, 2014	Nov 21, 2013	Yes	
Atelier Shallie Plus: Alchemists of the Dusk Sea	Role-playing	Gust Co. Ltd.	Koei Tecmo	Jan 17, 2017	Jan 20, 2017	Mar 3, 2016	Yes	
Atelier Sophie: The Alchemist of the Mysterious Book	Role-playing	Gust Co. Ltd.	Koei Tecmo	Jun 7, 2016	Jun 10, 2016	Nov 19, 2015	Yes	
Atelier Totori Plus: The Adventurer of Arland	Role-playing	Gust Co. Ltd.	Tecmo Koei	Mar 19, 2013	Mar 20, 2013	Nov 29, 2012	Yes	
Atomic Ninjas	Platform	Grip Games	Grip Games	Oct 8, 2013	Oct 2, 2013	Unreleased	Yes	
Attack of the Toy Tanks	Shooter	Ratalaika Games	Ratalaika Games	Jun 26, 2019	Jun 26, 2019	Jun 26, 2019	No	
Attack on Titan	Action	Omega Force	Koei Tecmo	Aug 30, 2016	Aug 26, 2016	Feb 18, 2016	Yes	
Attack on Titan 2	Action	Omega Force	Koei Tecmo	Mar 20, 2018	Mar 20, 2018	Mar 15, 2018	Yes	
Attractio	Puzzle-platform	GameCoder Studios; Renderfarm Studios	Bandai Namco Entertainment	Jun 14, 2016	Sep 9, 2016	Unreleased	Yes	
A.W.: Phoenix Festa	Simulation	A+ Games	Bandai Namco Entertainment	Jul 26, 2016	Jul 26, 2016	Jan 28, 2016	Yes	
Awesome Pea	Platform	Pigeon Dev Games	Pigeon Dev Games	Mar 1, 2019	Mar 1, 2019	Unreleased	No	
Awesome Pea 2	Platform	Pigeon Dev Games	Pigeon Dev Games	Jul 14, 2020	Jul 14, 2020	Unreleased	No	
Axiom Verge	Metroidvania	Thomas Happ Games; Sickhead Games	Thomas Happ Games	Apr 19, 2016	Apr 20, 2016	Unreleased	Yes	
Ayakashi Gohan: Oomori!	Otome game	Honeybee	Honeybee	Unreleased	Unreleased	Oct 8, 2015	Yes	
Azayaka na Irodori no Naka de, Kimi Rashiku	Visual novel	Prekano	Entergram	Unreleased	Unreleased	Feb 22, 2018	Yes	
Azkend 2: The World Beneath	Puzzle	10tons	10tons	May 3, 2016	May 3, 2016	Unreleased	Yes	
Baboon!	Platform	Relevo Videogames	Relevo Videogames	Unreleased	Jan 28, 2015	Aug 11, 2015	Yes	
Backgammon Blitz	Sports	VooFoo Studios	The Fyzz Facility	Apr 15, 2014	Dec 18, 2013	Unreleased	Yes	
Back in 1995	Survival horror	Throw the Warped Code Out	Ratalaika Games	May 21, 2019	Jun 28, 2019	Unreleased	No	
Back to Bed	Puzzle	Bedtime Digital Games	JP: Nippon Ichi Software; WW: Loot Interactive	Aug 25, 2015	Aug 25, 2015	Feb 9, 2017	Yes	
Bad Apple Wars	Otome game	Otomate	JP: Idea Factory; WW: Aksys Games	Oct 13, 2017	Oct 13, 2017	Nov 19, 2015	Yes	
Badland: Game of the Year Edition	Platform	Frogmind; BlitWorks	Frogmind	May 26, 2015	May 28, 2015	Jun 7, 2017	Yes (1-4 players)	
Bakumatsu Rock: Ultra Soul	Visual novel; rhythm	Marvelous	Marvelous	Unreleased	Unreleased	Sep 25, 2014	Yes	
Balthazar's Dream	Puzzle-platform	Hidden Trap	Hidden Trap	Jan 29, 2020	Jan 29, 2020	Jan 29, 2020	No	
Banbutsu Otome Dungeons	Dungeon crawler	UserJoy Japan	UserJoy Japan	Unreleased	Unreleased	Dec 21, 2017	Yes	
Bara ni Kakusareshi Verite	Otome game; Adventure	Ichi Column	Idea Factory	Unreleased	Unreleased	Aug 4, 2016	Yes	
Bard's Gold	Platform	Pixel Lantern	JP: EastAsiaSoft; WW: Pixel Lantern	Jun 17, 2016	Jun 17, 2016	Dec 15, 2016	Yes	
The Bard’s Tale: Remastered and Resnarkled	Action role-playing	inXile Entertainment; Square One Games	inXile Entertainment	Aug 17, 2017	Aug 21, 2017	Unreleased	Yes	
Baseball Riot	Action	10tons	10tons	Jan 19, 2016	Jan 20, 2016	Unreleased	Yes	
Bastion	Action role-playing	Supergiant Games; BlitWorks	Warner Bros. Interactive Entertainment	Dec 5, 2015	Dec 5, 2015	Unreleased	Yes	
Batman: Arkham Origins Blackgate	Action-adventure	Armature Studio	Warner Bros. Interactive Entertainment	Oct 25, 2013	Oct 25, 2013	Dec 5, 2013	Yes	
Battalion Commander	Shooter	A-steroids	Smartphone Labs	Dec 1, 2016	Dec 2, 2016	May 11, 2017	No	
Battle Rockets	Shooter, Fighting	Gumbo Machine; Fordesoft	Gumbo Machine	Mar 31, 2020	Mar 31, 2020	Unreleased	Yes	
Believer!	Otome game	HuneX	D3 Publisher	Unreleased	Unreleased	Dec 17, 2015	Yes	
Ben 10: Galactic Racing	Racing	Monkey Bar Games	D3 Publisher	Feb 22, 2012	Mar 16, 2012	Unreleased	Yes	
Beniiro Tenjō Ayakashi Kitan Futaai	Visual novel	HolicWorks	Dramatic Create	Unreleased	Unreleased	Nov 29, 2018	Yes	
Bentley's Hackpack	Arcade	Sanzaru Games	Sony Computer Entertainment	Feb 5, 2013	Mar 28, 2013	Unreleased	No	
Bento Fujiyama Tamagoyaki	Simulation	iTA-Choco Systems	Pygmy Studio	Unreleased	Unreleased	Apr 11, 2017	No	
Berserk and the Band of the Hawk	Action	Omega Force	Koei Tecmo	Feb 21, 2017	Feb 24, 2017	Oct 27, 2016	Yes	
Best of Arcade Games	Arcade	Eko Software	Bigben Interactive	Jan 20, 2015	Nov 28, 2014	Unreleased	Yes	
Best of Board Games	Arcade	Bigben Interactive	Bigben Interactive	Oct 14, 2014	Sep 24, 2014	Unreleased	Yes	
Big Dipper	Visual novel	Top Hat Studios Inc	Top Hat Studios Inc	Jul 27, 2020	Unreleased	Unreleased	Yes	
BigFest	Simulation	On the Metal; XDev	Sony Computer Entertainment	Dec 1, 2015	Dec 2, 2015	Unreleased	No	
Big Sky: Infinity	Shooter	Boss Baddie; VooFoo Studios	Ripstone	Dec 11, 2012	Dec 12, 2012	Unreleased	No	
BinaryStar	Otome game	Otomate; Design Factory	Idea Factory	Unreleased	Unreleased	Sep 4, 2014	Yes	
The Binding of Isaac: Rebirth	Roguelike	Nicalis	JP: Pikii; WW: Nicalis	Nov 4, 2014	Nov 5, 2014	Oct 28, 2015	Yes	
Bit.Trip	Platform	Choice Provisions	Choice Provisions	Dec 5, 2015	Dec 5, 2015	Unreleased	No	
Bit.Trip Presents... Runner2: Future Legend of Rhythm Alien	Platform	Gaijin Games	Gaijin Games	Dec 17, 2013	Dec 18, 2013	Unreleased	Yes	
Bit Dungeon Plus	Roguelike	Dolores Entertainment	JP: Cosen; WW: Hidden Trap	Mar 27, 2018	Jun 13, 2018	May 9, 2018	No	
Bitter Smile	Visual novel	Giga; Daidai	Technical Group Laboratory	Unreleased	Unreleased	Nov 28, 2013	Yes	
Black Wolves Saga: Weiβ und Schwarz	Otome game	Rejet; Otomate	Idea Factory	Unreleased	Unreleased	Jan 26, 2017	Yes	
Blast 'Em Bunnies	Shooter	Nnooo	JP: Teyon; WW: Nnooo	Mar 8, 2016	Mar 9, 2016	Nov 24, 2017	Yes	
Blasting Agent: Ultimate Edition	Platform	Axol Studio; Ratalaika Games	Ratalaika Games	Jun 20, 2017	Jun 20, 2017	Unreleased	No	
BlazBlue: Chrono Phantasma	Fighting	Arc System Works	JP: Arc System Works; NA: Aksys Games	Jun 24, 2014	Unreleased	Apr 24, 2014	Yes	
BlazBlue: Chrono Phantasma Extend (Note: Update for BlazBlue: Chrono Phantasma.)	Fighting	Arc System Works	JP: Arc System Works; NA: Aksys Games	Jul 28, 2015	Unreleased	Apr 23, 2015	Yes	
BlazBlue: Continuum Shift Extend	Fighting	Arc System Works	JP: Arc System Works; NA: Aksys Games; EU: PQube	Feb 14, 2012	Feb 24, 2012	Dec 17, 2011	Yes	
Blind Men	Visual novel	Man-Eater Games	Man-Eater Games	Apr 14, 2020	Unreleased	Unreleased	Yes	
Block-a-Pix Deluxe	Puzzle	Lightwood Games	Lightwood Games	Mar 26, 2019	Unreleased	Unreleased	No	
Bloodstained: Curse of the Moon	Metroidvania	Inti Creates; Armature Studio	505 Games	May 24, 2018	May 24, 2018	May 24, 2018	Yes	
Bloxiq	Puzzle	Blot Interactive	Blot Interactive	Apr 14, 2015	Unreleased	Unreleased	No	
Blue-Collar Astronaut	Action	Mutated Software	Mutated Software	Mar 14, 2017	Unreleased	Unreleased	No	
Blue Reflection	Role-playing	Gust Co. Ltd.	Koei Tecmo	Unreleased	Unreleased	Mar 30, 2017	Yes	
Bodycheck	Sports	Ludometrics	Ludometrics	Sep 12, 2017	May 30, 2017	Unreleased	Yes	
Boku to Nurse no Kenshū Nisshi	Visual novel	Prekano	Entergram	Unreleased	Unreleased	Aug 23, 2018	Yes	
Boku wa Mori Sekai no Kami Tonaru	Action	Pygmy Studio	Pygmy Studio	Unreleased	Unreleased	Dec 1, 2016	No	
Bombing Busters	Action	Sanuk Games	Sanuk Games	Dec 7, 2015	Oct 28, 2015	Unreleased	No	
Bonds of the Skies	Action role-playing	Hit Point	Kemco	Mar 5, 2019	Mar 5, 2019	Mar 5, 2019	No	
Boolink	Shoot 'em up	Planet G	Planet G	Unreleased	Unreleased	Oct 31, 2013	No	
Borderlands 2	First-person shooter	Gearbox Software; Iron Galaxy Studios	Sony Computer Entertainment	May 13, 2014	May 30, 2014	Dec 4, 2014	North America/Europe only	
Boss!	Action	Fair Play Labs	Fair Play Labs	Dec 9, 2014	Unreleased	Unreleased	Yes	
A Boy and His Blob	Platform	WayForward Technologies; Abstraction Games	Majesco	Jan 21, 2016	Jan 19, 2016	Unreleased	Yes	
Bouncy Bullets	Action	Ratalaika Games	Ratalaika Games	Jul 9, 2019	Jul 9, 2019	Unreleased	No	
Breach & Clear	Turn-based strategy	Mighty Rabbit Studios	Gun Media	May 12, 2015	Unreleased	Unreleased	Yes	
BreakQuest: Extra Evolution	Action	Beatshapers	Beatshapers	Aug 13, 2013	Aug 7, 2013	Unreleased	Yes	
Breeder Homegrown: Director's Cut	Adventure	Sometimes You	Sometimes You	Mar 6, 2019	Mar 6, 2019	Unreleased	No	
The Bridge	Puzzle	The Quantum Astrophysicists Guild	The Quantum Astrophysicists Guild	Aug 18, 2015	Aug 25, 2015	Unreleased	Yes	
Bridge Constructor	Simulation	Clockstone Studio; Stage Clear Studios	Headup Games	Feb 14, 2017	Feb 15, 2017	Unreleased	No	
Broken Age: The Complete Adventure	Adventure	Double Fine Productions	Double Fine Productions	Apr 28, 2015	Apr 29, 2015	Unreleased	Yes	
Broken Sword 5: The Serpent's Curse, Episode 1	Adventure	Revolution Software	Revolution Software	May 6, 2014	Dec 18, 2013	Unreleased	Yes	
Broken Sword 5: The Serpent's Curse, Episode 2	Adventure	Revolution Software	Revolution Software	Dec 23, 2014	May 28, 2014	Unreleased	No	
Brotherhood United	Platform	EastAsiaSoft	EastAsiaSoft	Jul 20, 2021	Jul 20, 2021	Jul 20, 2021	No	
Brothers Conflict: Precious Baby	Otome game; Dating sim	Otomate	Idea Factory	Unreleased	Unreleased	Apr 7, 2016	Yes	
Browser San Goku Shi Next	Strategy	Marvelous Inc.	Marvelous Inc.	Unreleased	Unreleased	May 16, 2018	No	
Bucket Knight	Platform	Sometimes You	Sometimes You	Feb 28, 2020	Feb 28, 2020	Unreleased	No	
Bullet Girls	Third-person shooter	Shade	D3 Publisher	Unreleased	Unreleased	Aug 28, 2014	Yes	
Bullet Girls 2	Third-person shooter	Shade	D3 Publisher	Unreleased	Unreleased	Apr 21, 2016	Yes	
Bullet Girls Phantasia	Third-person shooter	Shade	D3 Publisher	Unreleased	Unreleased	Aug 9, 2018	Yes	
Bunny Must Die! Chelsea and the 7 Devils	Platform	Platine Dispositif	Mediascape	Apr 5, 2018	Apr 18, 2018	Jul 21, 2016	Yes	
Buried Stars	Visual novel	Studio Largo	LINE Games	Unreleased	Unreleased	Jul 30, 2020	Yes	
Burly Men at Sea	Adventure	Brain&Brain	Brain&Brain	Sep 19, 2017	Oct 3, 2017	Unreleased	No	
Burn the Rope	Puzzle	RingZero Game Studio	Big Blue Bubble	Dec 18, 2012	Oct 17, 2012	Unreleased	No	
Cafe Cuillere	Otome game	Takuyo	Takuyo	Unreleased	Unreleased	May 31, 2018	Yes	
The Caligula Effect	Role-playing	Aquria	JP: FuRyu; WW: Atlus USA	May 2, 2017	May 9, 2017	Jun 23, 2016	Yes	
Call of Duty: Black Ops: Declassified	First-person shooter	Nihilistic Software	Activision	Nov 13, 2012	Nov 13, 2012	Dec 20, 2012	No	
Captain Earth: Mind Labyrinth	Visual novel; Puzzle	Bandai Namco Games	Bandai Namco Games	Unreleased	Unreleased	Feb 26, 2015	Yes	
Castle Invasion: Throne Out	Tower defense	Cat Trap Studios	Cat Trap Studios	Oct 11, 2016	Oct 11, 2016	Unreleased	No	
CastleStorm	Tower defense	Zen Studios	JP: Spike Chunsoft; WW: Zen Studios	Nov 5, 2013	Nov 6, 2013	Mar 11, 2015	Yes	
Catherine: Full Body	Puzzle-platform; adventure	Atlus; Studio Zero	Atlus	Unreleased	Unreleased	Feb 14, 2019	Yes	
Cel Damage HD	Vehicular combat	Pseudo Interactive; Finish Line Games	Finish Line Games	Apr 22, 2014	May 14, 2014	Unreleased	Yes	
Chain Chronicle V	Role-playing	Sega	Sega	Unreleased	Unreleased	Sep 11, 2014	No	
Chaos;Child	Visual novel	5pb.	JP: 5pb.; WW: PQube	Oct 13, 2017	Oct 17, 2017	Jun 25, 2015	Yes	
Chaos;Child Love Chu Chu!!	Visual novel	5pb.	5pb.	Unreleased	Unreleased	Mar 30, 2017	Yes	
Chaos;Head Love Chu Chu!!	Visual novel	5pb.	5pb.	Unreleased	Unreleased	Aug 21, 2014	Yes	
Chaos;Head Noah	Visual novel	5pb.	5pb.	Unreleased	Unreleased	Aug 21, 2014	Yes	
Chaos Rings	Role-playing	Media.Vision; Bullet	Square Enix	Jul 24, 2013	Jul 24, 2013	Jul 24, 2013	Yes	
Chaos Rings II	Role-playing	Media.Vision; Bullet	Square Enix	Unreleased	Unreleased	May 7, 2015	Yes	
Chaos Rings III	Role-playing	Media.Vision; Bullet	Square Enix	Unreleased	Unreleased	May 7, 2015	Yes	
Chaos Rings Omega	Role-playing	Media.Vision; Bullet	Square Enix	Unreleased	Unreleased	May 7, 2015	Yes	
Charade Maniacs	Otome game	Otomate	Idea Factory	Unreleased	Unreleased	Aug 9, 2018	Yes	
Chasm	Platform	Bit Kid	Bit Kid	Jul 31, 2018	Aug 1, 2018	Unreleased	No	
Chicken Range	Shooter	NYX Digital	Funbox Media	Oct 26, 2018	Oct 26, 2018	Unreleased	No	
Child of Light	Role-playing	Ubisoft Montreal	Ubisoft	Jul 1, 2014	Jul 2, 2014	Jul 31, 2014	Yes	
Chronovolt	Puzzle-platform	Playerthree	Playerthree	Dec 31, 2012	Nov 21, 2012	Unreleased	Yes	
Chronus Arc	Role-playing	Kemco	Kemco	Mar 1, 2019	Mar 1, 2019	Oct 10, 2018	No	
Chōchō Jiken Rhapsodic	Otome game	Red Entertainment	Idea Factory	Unreleased	Unreleased	Nov 30, 2017	Yes	
Chō no Doku Hana no Kusari: Taishō Enren Ibun	Otome game	Aromarie	Prototype	Unreleased	Unreleased	Feb 20, 2014	Yes	
ChuSinGura46+1	Visual novel	Inre	Dramatic Create	Unreleased	Unreleased	May 28, 2015	Yes	
Ciel Nosurge •Ciel Nosurge RE:Incarnation	Simulation	Gust Co. Ltd.	Tecmo Koei	Unreleased	Unreleased	Apr 26, 2012	No	
Citizens of Earth	Role-playing	Eden Industries	JP: Arc System Works; WW: Atlus USA	Jan 20, 2015	Jan 21, 2015	Oct 26, 2016	Yes	
Civilization Revolution 2 Plus	Strategy	Firaxis Games	2K Games	Mar 29, 2016	Mar 29, 2016	Dec 3, 2015	No	
Cladun Returns: This is Sengoku	Action role-playing	Nippon Ichi Software	Nippon Ichi Software	Jun 6, 2017	Jun 9, 2017	May 26, 2016	Yes	
Claire: Extended Cut	Survival horror	Hailstorm Games	Hailstorm Games	Aug 30, 2016	Aug 31, 2016	Unreleased	Yes	
Clannad	Visual novel	Key	Prototype	Unreleased	Unreleased	Aug 14, 2014	Yes	
Cliff Diving	Arcade	Spiral House	Sony Computer Entertainment	Feb 21, 2012	Feb 22, 2012	Jun 28, 2012	No	
Clock Zero: Shūen no Ichibyō ExTime	Otome game	Otomate; Design Factory	Idea Factory	Unreleased	Unreleased	Apr 23, 2015	Yes	
Clover Day's	Visual novel	ALcot	ALcot	Unreleased	Unreleased	Sep 28, 2017	Yes	
Coconut Dodge Revitalised	Puzzle	FuturLab	FuturLab	Jul 9, 2013	Jun 5, 2013	Unreleased	Yes	
Code: Realize − Guardian of Rebirth	Otome game	Otomate; Design Factory	JP: Idea Factory; WW: Aksys Games	Oct 20, 2015	Oct 21, 2015	Nov 27, 2014	Yes	
Code: Realize − Future Blessings	Otome game	Otomate; Design Factory	JP: Idea Factory; WW: Aksys Games	Mar 30, 2018	Mar 30, 2018	Nov 24, 2016	Yes	
Code: Realize − Shirogane no Kiseki	Otome game	Otomate; Design Factory	Idea Factory	Unreleased	Unreleased	Dec 21, 2017	Yes	
Collar × Malice	Otome game	Otomate: Design Factory	JP: Idea Factory; WW: Aksys Games	Jul 28, 2017	Jul 28, 2017	Aug 18, 2016	Yes	
Collar × Malice: Unlimited	Otome game	Otomate: Design Factory	Idea Factory	Unreleased	Unreleased	Jul 26, 2018	Yes	
Color Guardians	Action	Fair Play Labs	JP: CrossFunction; WW: Fair Play Labs	May 12, 2015	May 15, 2015	Jan 27, 2017	Yes	
Color Slayer	Action	The Domaginarium	The Domaginarium	Sep 24, 2019	Sep 24, 2019	Unreleased	No	
Colors!	Application	Collecting Smiles	Collecting Smiles	Nov 13, 2012	Unreleased	Unreleased	Yes	
Conception II: Children of the Seven Stars	Role-playing	Spike Chunsoft	JP: Spike Chunsoft; WW: Atlus USA	Apr 15, 2014	May 14, 2014	Aug 22, 2013	Yes	
Conga Master Go!	Rhythm	Rising Star Games	Hidden Trap	Jul 24, 2019	Jul 24, 2019	Jul 26, 2019	No	
Contraptions	Action	Funbox Media	Funbox Media	Oct 28, 2020	Dec 4, 2020	Unreleased	No	
Corridor Z	Endless runner	Mass Creation	Mass Creation	May 3, 2016	May 3, 2016	Unreleased	No	
Corpse Party: Blood Drive	Adventure	Team GrisGris; 5pb.	JP: 5pb.; WW: Xseed Games	Oct 13, 2015	Oct 20, 2015	Jul 24, 2014	Yes	
Cosmic Star Heroine	Role-playing	Zeboyd Games	Zeboyd Games	Apr 24, 2018	Jun 5, 2018	Unreleased	No	
Cosmophony	Rail shooter	Bento-Studio; Moving Player	Moving Player	May 5, 2015	May 6, 2015	Unreleased	No	
CounterSpy	Action	Dynamighty	Sony Computer Entertainment	Aug 19, 2014	Aug 20, 2014	Aug 21, 2014	Yes	
The Count Lucanor	Adventure	Baroque Decay; Ratalaika Games	Merge Games	Jan 9, 2018	Jan 9, 2018	Unreleased	No	
Crank In	Otome game	Petit Reve	Future Tech Lab	Unreleased	Unreleased	Aug 31, 2017	Yes	
Crazy Market	Puzzle	The Game Atelier	The Game Atelier	Oct 29, 2013	Oct 16, 2013	Unreleased	No	
Criminal Girls: Invite Only	Role-playing	Imageepoch	Nippon Ichi Software	Feb 3, 2015	Feb 6, 2015	Nov 28, 2013	Yes	
Criminal Girls 2: Party Favors	Role-playing	Imageepoch	Nippon Ichi Software	Sep 20, 2016	Sep 23, 2016	Nov 26, 2015	Yes	
Crimsonland	Shooter	10tons	10tons	Aug 19, 2014	Aug 20, 2014	Unreleased	Yes	
Croixleur Sigma	Hack and slash	Souvenir Circ.	Playism	Mar 1, 2016	Mar 8, 2016	Dec 24, 2015	Yes	
Cross Ange: Tenshi to Ryū no Rondo tr.	Action	Shade	Bandai Namco Entertainment	Unreleased	Unreleased	May 28, 2015	No	
Cross Channel: For All People	Visual novel	FlyingShine; Willplus; Regista	5pb.	Unreleased	Unreleased	Jun 26, 2014	Yes	
Crossovers By POWGI	Puzzle	Lightwood Games	Lightwood Games	Apr 17, 2019	Unreleased	Unreleased	No	
Crypt of the NecroDancer	Roguelike; rhythm	Brace Yourself Games; BlitWorks	JP: Spike Chunsoft; WW: Brace Yourself Games	Feb 2, 2016	Feb 2, 2016	Jan 18, 2016	Yes (1-2 players)	
Crypto by POWGI	Puzzle	Lightwood Games	Lightwood Games	Jul 7, 2020	Unreleased	Unreleased	No	
Cure Mate Club	Visual novel	Atu Works	Daidai	Unreleased	Unreleased	Mar 14, 2013	Yes	
Curses 'N Chaos	Beat 'em up	Tribute Games	Tribute Games	Aug 18, 2015	Sep 11, 2015	Unreleased	Yes (1-2 players)	
Cybarian: The Time Travelling Warrior	Platform	Lightwood Games	Lightwood Games	Jun 18, 2019	Jun 18, 2019	Unreleased	No	
Daggerhood	Platform	Woblyware	Woblyware	Feb 19, 2019	Feb 19, 2019	Unreleased	No	
Daidai Daisuki	Visual novel	Kadokawa Games	Kadokawa Games	Unreleased	Unreleased	Mar 31, 2015	No	
Dance with Devils	Otome game	Rejet	Rejet	Unreleased	Unreleased	Mar 24, 2016	Yes	
Dance with Devils: My Carol	Otome game	Rejet	Rejet	Unreleased	Unreleased	Mar 22, 2018	Yes	
Dairansō Dash or Dasshu!!	Arcade	Planet G	Planet G	Unreleased	Unreleased	Feb 27, 2014	Yes	
Daisenryaku Daitōa Kōbōshi 3 Dai Niji Sekai Taisen Boppatsu! Sūjiku-gun Tai Rengō-gun Zen Sekai-sen	Turn-based strategy	SystemSoft Alpha	SystemSoft Alpha	Unreleased	Unreleased	Mar 26, 2015	No	
Daisenryaku Exceed II	Turn-based strategy	SystemSoft Alpha	SystemSoft Alpha	Unreleased	Unreleased	Apr 29, 2015	Yes	
Daisenryaku Perfect: Senjō no Hasha	Turn-based strategy	SystemSoft Alpha	SystemSoft Alpha	Unreleased	Unreleased	Mar 3, 2016	Yes	
Daisenryaku Web	Turn-based strategy	SystemSoft Alpha	SystemSoft Alpha	Unreleased	Unreleased	Oct 24, 2016	No	
Daitoshokan no Hitsujikai: Library Party	Visual novel	August	Aria Soft	Unreleased	Unreleased	Feb 12, 2015	Yes	
Damascus Gear: Operation Osaka	Action role-playing	A+ Games	Arc System Works	Mar 7, 2018	Unreleased	Unreleased	Yes	
Damascus Gear: Operation Tokyo	Action role-playing	A+ Games	Arc System Works	Mar 24, 2015	Apr 29, 2015	Dec 26, 2013	Yes	
Danball Senki W	Role-playing	Level-5	Level-5	Unreleased	Unreleased	Oct 18, 2012	Yes	
Danjon ni Deai o Motomeru no wa Machigatteiru Darou ka? Infinite Combate	Shooter	5pb.	PQube	Unreleased	Unreleased	Nov 28, 2019	No	
Danganronpa: Trigger Happy Havoc (Note: Bundled together and released as Danganronpa 1 & 2 Reloaded in Japan.)	Adventure	Spike Chunsoft	JP: Spike Chunsoft; WW: NIS America	Feb 11, 2014	Feb 14, 2014	Oct 10, 2013	Japan/North America only	
Danganronpa 2: Goodbye Despair^{[A]}	Adventure	Spike Chunsoft	JP: Spike Chunsoft; WW: NIS America	Sep 2, 2014	Sep 5, 2014	Oct 10, 2013	Yes	
Danganronpa Another Episode: Ultra Despair Girls	Action-adventure	Spike Chunsoft	JP: Spike Chunsoft; WW: NIS America	Sep 1, 2015	Sep 4, 2015	Sep 25, 2014	Yes	
Danganronpa V3: Killing Harmony	Adventure	Spike Chunsoft	JP: Spike Chunsoft; WW: NIS America	Sep 26, 2017	Sep 29, 2017	Jan 12, 2017	Yes	
DanMachi de Shooting wa Machigatteiru Darou ka	Shoot 'em up	5pb.	PQube	Unreleased	Unreleased	Nov 28, 2019	No	
Daredemo Shodan ni Nareru Igo Kyōshitsu	Go	Silver Star	Silver Star	Unreleased	Unreleased	May 25, 2017	Yes	
DariusBurst: Chronicle Saviours	Shoot 'em up	Pyramid; Chara-Ani; G.rev	JP: Chara-Ani; WW: Degica	Nov 30, 2015	Dec 8, 2015	Jan 14, 2016	Yes	
Darkest Dungeon	Role-playing	Red Hook Studios; Sickhead Games	Red Hook Studios	Sep 27, 2016	Sep 27, 2016	Unreleased	Yes	
Date A Live Twin Edition: Rio Reincarnation	Visual novel	Sting Entertainment	Compile Heart	Unreleased	Unreleased	Jul 30, 2015	Yes	
Day D Tower Rush	Real-time strategy	Creobit	4 Hit	Aug 26, 2014	Jul 16, 2014	Unreleased	Yes	
Day of the Tentacle Remastered	Adventure	LucasArts; Double Fine Productions	Double Fine Productions	Mar 22, 2016	Mar 22, 2016	Unreleased	Yes	
Dead Ahead: Zombie Warfare	Survival horror	Mobirate Studio	Mobirate Studio	May 8, 2018	May 29, 2018	Unreleased	No	
Deadbolt	Roguelike	Hopoo Games	Hopoo Games	Feb 20, 2018	Feb 20, 2018	Unreleased	No	
Deadman's Cross	Role-playing	Square Enix	Square Enix	Feb 17, 2015	Unreleased	Feb 24, 2015	No	
Dead Nation	Action	Housemarque	Sony Computer Entertainment	Apr 15, 2014	Apr 16, 2014	May 29, 2014	Yes	
Dead or Alive 5 Plus	Fighting	Team Ninja	Tecmo Koei	Mar 22, 2013	Mar 22, 2013	Mar 20, 2013	Yes	
Dead or Alive Xtreme 3: Venus	Sports	Team Ninja	Koei Tecmo	Unreleased	Unreleased	Mar 24, 2016	Yes	
Death Mark	Adventure	Experience	JP: Nippon Ichi Software; WW: Aksys Games	Oct 31, 2018	Oct 31, 2018	Jun 1, 2017	Yes	
Death Tales	Role-playing	EastAsiaSoft	EastAsiaSoft	Unreleased	Unreleased	Jan 6, 2021	No	
Deathmatch Village	Multiplayer online battle arena	Bloober Team	Bloober Team	Sep 2, 2014	Aug 7, 2013	Unreleased	Yes	
Deception IV: Blood Ties	Action	Tecmo Koei	Tecmo Koei	Mar 25, 2014	Mar 28, 2014	Feb 27, 2014	Yes	
Deception IV: The Nightmare Princess (Note: Update for Deception IV: Blood Ties.)	Action	Koei Tecmo	Koei Tecmo	Jul 14, 2015	Jul 17, 2015	Mar 26, 2015	Yes	
Deep Ones	Platform	Burp! Games	Sometimes You	Apr 11, 2018	Apr 11, 2018	Unreleased	Yes	
Deep Space Rush	Shooter	Ratalaika Games	Ratalaika Games	Oct 25, 2019	Oct 25, 2019	Oct 25, 2019	Yes	
Deemo: The Last Recital	Rhythm	Rayark Games	JP: Rayark Games; NA: PM Studios	May 16, 2017	Unreleased	Jun 24, 2015	No	
The Deer God	Platform	Crescent Moon Games; Blowfish Studios	Level 77	Apr 25, 2017	Apr 25, 2017	Unreleased	Yes	
Defender's Quest	Tower defense; role-playing	Level Up Labs	Level Up Labs	May 29, 2018	Unreleased	Unreleased	No	
Delta Strike: First Assault	Shooter	Cerberus	Cerberus	May 31, 2016	Jun 21, 2016	Nov 7, 2016	No	
Demetrios	Adventure	CowCat	CowCat	Dec 6, 2016	Dec 6, 2016	Unreleased	Yes	
Demon's Tier+	Dungeon crawler	CowCat	CowCat	Jun 9, 2020	Jun 30, 2020	Unreleased	Yes	
Demon Gaze	Dungeon crawler	Experience	JP: Kadokawa Games; WW: NIS America	Apr 22, 2014	Apr 30, 2014	Jan 24, 2013	Yes	
Demon Gaze II	Dungeon crawler	Experience	JP: Kadokawa Games; WW: NIS America	Nov 14, 2017	Nov 17, 2017	Oct 13, 2016	Yes	
Demon Rush, The: Legends Corrupt	Role-playing	Dragoon Entertainment Ltd.	Dragoon Entertainment Ltd.	Jun 30, 2020	Unreleased	Unreleased	No	
Dengeki Bunko: Fighting Climax	Fighting	Ecole Software; French Bread	Sega	Oct 6, 2015	Oct 6, 2015	Nov 13, 2014	No	
Dengeki Bunko: Fighting Climax Ignition (Note: Update for Dengeki Bunko: Fighting Climax.)	Fighting	Ecole Software; French Bread	Sega	Unreleased	Unreleased	Dec 17, 2015	No	
Desert Ashes	Tower defense	Nine Tales Digital	Nine Tales Digital	Feb 24, 2015	Unreleased	Unreleased	Yes (1-2 players)	
Desire Remaster Version	Visual novel; Adventure	El Dia	Red Flagship	Unreleased	Unreleased	Apr 27, 2017	Yes	
Destiny of Spirits	Strategy; role-playing	Japan Studio; Q Entertainment	Sony Computer Entertainment	Mar 25, 2014	Mar 26, 2014	Mar 20, 2014	No	
Devious Dungeon	Platform	Ratalaika Games	Noodlecake Studios	Apr 25, 2018	Apr 25, 2018	Unreleased	No	
Devious Dungeon 2	Platform	Ratalaika Games	Noodlecake Studios	May 14, 2019	Jul 5, 2019	Unreleased	No	
Dex	Action role-playing	Dreadlocks Ltd	BadLand Games	Dec 20, 2016	Dec 20, 2016	Unreleased	No	
Diabolik Lovers: Dark Fate	Otome game	Rejet; Otomate	Idea Factory	Unreleased	Unreleased	Feb 26, 2015	Yes	
Diabolik Lovers Limited V Edition	Otome game	Rejet; Otomate	Idea Factory	Unreleased	Unreleased	Dec 19, 2013	Yes	
Diabolik Lovers: Lost Eden	Otome game	Rejet; Otomate	Idea Factory	Unreleased	Unreleased	Feb 16, 2017	Yes	
Diabolik Lovers: Lunatic Parade	Otome game	Rejet; Otomate	Idea Factory	Unreleased	Unreleased	Feb 25, 2016	Yes	
Diabolik Lovers: More,Blood Limited V Edition	Otome game	Rejet; Otomate	Idea Factory	Unreleased	Unreleased	Jan 15, 2015	Yes	
Diabolik Lovers: Vandead Carnival	Otome game	Rejet; Otomate	Idea Factory	Unreleased	Unreleased	Dec 4, 2014	Yes	
Die! Die! Die!	Tower defense	iFun4All	iFun4All	Oct 1, 2013	Aug 7, 2013	Unreleased	No	
Digimon Story: Cyber Sleuth	Role-playing	Media.Vision	Bandai Namco Games	Feb 2, 2016	Feb 5, 2016	Mar 21, 2015	Yes	
Digimon Story: Cyber Sleuth – Hacker's Memory	Role-playing	Media.Vision	Bandai Namco Entertainment	Jan 19, 2018	Jan 19, 2018	Dec 14, 2017	Yes	
Digimon World: Next Order	Role-playing	B.B. Studio	Bandai Namco Entertainment	Unreleased	Unreleased	Mar 17, 2016	Yes	
Dino Dini's Kick Off Revival	Sports	Koo Games	The Digital Lounge	Mar 7, 2017	Feb 22, 2017	Unreleased	No	
Disgaea 3: Absence of Detention	Tactical role-playing	Nippon Ichi Software	Nippon Ichi Software	Apr 17, 2012	Apr 20, 2012	Dec 17, 2011	Yes	
Disgaea 4: A Promise Revisited	Tactical role-playing	Nippon Ichi Software	Nippon Ichi Software	Aug 12, 2014	Aug 29, 2014	Jan 30, 2014	Yes	
DISTRAINT: Deluxe Edition	Adventure	Winterveil Studios Oy	Ratalaika Games	Sep 10, 2019	Unreleased	Nov 14, 2019	No	
Disney Infinity: Marvel Super Heroes	Action-adventure	Avalanche Software	Disney Interactive Studios	May 9, 2015	May 28, 2015	Unreleased	Yes	
Divekick	Fighting	Iron Galaxy Studios; One True Game Studios	Iron Galaxy Studios	Aug 20, 2013	Aug 21, 2013	Sep 17, 2014	Yes	
DJMax Technika Tune	Rhythm	Pentavision	JP: Cyberfront; WW: Pentavision	Dec 4, 2012	Unreleased	Sep 27, 2012	No	
Doctor Who: The Eternity Clock	Adventure, puzzle	Supermassive Games	BBC Worldwide	Oct 9, 2012	Oct 10, 2012	Unreleased	No	
Dogimegi Inryoku-chan: Love & Peace	Platform	Arc System Works	Arc System Works	Unreleased	Unreleased	Dec 10, 2015	Yes	
Doki-Doki Universe	Adventure	HumaNature Studios	Sony Computer Entertainment	Dec 10, 2013	Dec 11, 2013	Feb 22, 2014	Yes	
Dokuro	Puzzle-platform	Game Arts	GungHo Online Entertainment	Oct 15, 2012	Jan 30, 2013	Jul 5, 2012	No	
Don't Die, Mr. Robot!	Action	Infinite State Games	Infinite State Games	Nov 4, 2014	Nov 5, 2014	Unreleased	Yes	
Don't Starve: Giant Edition	Action-adventure	Klei Entertainment; BlitWorks	Klei Entertainment	Sep 2, 2014	Sep 3, 2014	Unreleased	Yes	
Doodle Devil	Puzzle	JoyBits	8 Floor Games	Jan 14, 2014	Oct 23, 2013	Unreleased	Yes	
Doodle God	Puzzle	JoyBits	8 Floor Games	Jul 16, 2013	Jan 23, 2013	Unreleased	Yes	
Doodle Kingdom	Puzzle	JoyBits	8 Floor Games	Mar 31, 2015	Mar 11, 2015	Unreleased	No	
Doukoku Soshite...	Visual novel; Adventure	Studio Line; Sakata SAS; El Dia	El Dia	Unreleased	Unreleased	Apr 26, 2018	Yes	
Downwell	Roguelike	Moppin	Devolver Digital	May 24, 2016	May 24, 2016	May 24, 2016	Yes	
Dragon Ball Z: Battle of Z	Fighting	Artdink	Bandai Namco Games	Jan 28, 2014	Jan 29, 2014	Jan 23, 2014	No	
Dragon Fantasy Book I •Dragon Fantasy: The Volumes of Westeria	Role-playing	The Muteki Corporation	The Muteki Corporation	Apr 16, 2013	Jun 18, 2014	Unreleased	Yes	
Dragon Fantasy Book II	Role-playing	The Muteki Corporation	The Muteki Corporation	Sep 10, 2013	Unreleased	Unreleased	Yes	
Dragon Fin Soup	Roguelike	Grimm Bros; BlitWorks	Grimm Bros	Nov 6, 2015	Nov 3, 2015	Dec 2, 2015	Yes	
Dragon Quest Builders	Sandbox, role-playing	Square Enix Business Division 5	Square Enix	Oct 11, 2016	Oct 14, 2016	Jan 28, 2016	No	
Dragon Quest Heroes II	Action role-playing	Omega Force	Square Enix	Unreleased	Unreleased	May 27, 2016	Yes	
Dragon's Crown	Action role-playing	Vanillaware	EU: NIS America; WW: Atlus	Aug 6, 2013	Oct 10, 2013	Jul 25, 2013	Yes	
Dragon's Dogma Quest	Action role-playing	Capcom	Capcom	Unreleased	Unreleased	Dec 19, 2013	Yes	
Dragons Online	Role-playing	Stephen Allen	Stephen Allen	Unreleased	Jun 7, 2017	Unreleased	Yes	
Dragon Sinker	Role-playing	Exe Create	Kemco	Feb 6, 2018	Sep 19, 2018	Jan 18, 2018	Yes	
Dragonfly Chronicles	Platform	Marco Ayala Games	Marco Ayala Games	Dec 11, 2018	Unreleased	Unreleased	No	
Dragooned	Platform	Dragoon Entertainment	Dragoon Entertainment	Apr 17, 2018	Unreleased	Unreleased	No	
Dramatical Murder Re:code	Otome game	Nitro+chiral	Nitroplus	Unreleased	Unreleased	Oct 30, 2014	Yes	
Draw Slasher	Action	Mass Creation	JP: Teyon; WW: Mass Creation	Apr 23, 2013	Apr 24, 2013	Apr 24, 2014	No	
Dream Club Zero Portable	Dating sim	Tamsoft	D3 Publisher	Unreleased	Unreleased	Dec 17, 2011	No	
Dreamwalker	Puzzle	Code Mystics	Code Mystics	Dec 18, 2018	Jan 15, 2019	Unreleased	Yes	
Dreii	Puzzle	Etter Studio	Bitforge	Mar 8, 2016	Mar 9, 2016	Unreleased	No	
Dreamlands, The: Aisling's Quest	Adventure	The Domaginarium	The Domaginarium	Aug 7, 2018	May 7, 2019	Unreleased	No	
Drive Girls	Action	Tamsoft	JP: Bergsala Lightweight; NA: Aksys Games; EU: Rising Star Games	Sep 8, 2017	Jun 9, 2017	Jan 26, 2017	No	
Drowning	Adventure	Polygonal Wolf	Sometimes You	Jan 30, 2019	Unreleased	Unreleased	No	
D.S. Dal Segno	Visual novel	Circus	Entergram	Unreleased	Unreleased	Mar 22, 2018	Yes	
Duck Souls+	Adventure	Ratalaika Games	Ratalaika Games	Mar 24, 2020	Unreleased	Mar 26, 2020	No	
Duke Nukem 3D: Megaton Edition	First-person shooter	3D Realms; General Arcade; Abstraction Games	Devolver Digital	Jan 6, 2015	Jan 7, 2015	Unreleased	North America only	
Dull Grey	Visual novel	Sometimes You	Sometimes You	May 5, 2021	May 5, 2021	Unreleased	No	
Dungeons & Bombs	Action	Sometimes You	EastAsiaSoft	Unreleased	Unreleased	Apr 23, 2021	No	
Dungeon Hunter: Alliance	Action role-playing	Gameloft Montreal	Ubisoft	Feb 15, 2012	Feb 22, 2012	Dec 17, 2011	Japan only	
Dungeon Hunter 5 •Dark Quest 5^{JP}	Role-playing	Gameloft	Laplace	Unreleased	Unreleased	Mar 11, 2015	No	
Dungeon Punks	Action role-playing	Hyper Awesome Entertainment	Hyper Awesome Entertainment	Aug 16, 2016	Aug 17, 2016	Unreleased	Yes	
Dungeon Travelers 2: The Royal Library & the Monster Seal	Dungeon crawler	Sting Entertainment	JP: Aquaplus; NA: Atlus USA; EU: NIS America	Aug 18, 2015	Oct 16, 2015	Sep 25, 2014	Yes	
Dungeon Travelers 2-2	Dungeon crawler	Sting Entertainment	Aquaplus	Unreleased	Unreleased	Apr 20, 2017	Yes	
Durarara!! 3way standoff alley V	Visual novel; puzzle; rhythm	Netchubiyori	Kadokawa Games	Unreleased	Unreleased	Jun 19, 2014	Yes	
Durarara!! Relay	Adventure	Kadokawa Games	Kadokawa Games	Unreleased	Unreleased	Jan 29, 2015	Yes	
Dustforce	Platform	Hitbox Team	Capcom	Feb 4, 2014	Feb 5, 2014	Unreleased	Yes	
Dying: Reborn	Puzzle	Nekcom	Oasis Games	Mar 14, 2017	Apr 12, 2017	May 25, 2017	No	
Dynamic Chord feat. Apple-polisher V Edition	Otome game	Honeybee Black	Honeybee	Unreleased	Unreleased	Jun 28, 2018	Yes	
Dynamic Chord feat. Kyosho V Edition	Otome game	Honeybee Black	Honeybee	Unreleased	Unreleased	Mar 30, 2017	Yes	
Dynamic Chord feat. Liar-S V Edition	Otome game	Honeybee Black	Honeybee	Unreleased	Unreleased	Dec 22, 2016	Yes	
Dynamic Chord feat. rêve parfait V Edition	Otome game	Honeybee Black	Honeybee	Unreleased	Unreleased	Sep 29, 2016	Yes	
Dynasty Warriors 8: Empires (Note: Stand-alone expansion for Dynasty Warriors 8.)	Action	Omega Force	Koei Tecmo	Nov 24, 2015	Nov 25, 2015	Nov 26, 2015	Yes	
Dynasty Warriors 8: Xtreme Legends Complete Edition	Action	Omega Force	Tecmo Koei	Mar 25, 2014	Apr 4, 2014	Nov 28, 2013	Yes	
Dynasty Warriors: Godseekers	Strategy role-playing	Omega Force	Koei Tecmo	Jan 31, 2017	Feb 2, 2017	Aug 3, 2016	Yes	
Dynasty Warriors Next	Action	Omega Force	Tecmo Koei	Feb 15, 2012	Feb 22, 2012	Dec 17, 2011	No	
Dynasty Warriors Online Z	MMORPG	Omega Force	Koei Tecmo	Unreleased	Unreleased	Nov 19, 2015	No	

== See also ==
- List of PlayStation applications
- List of PlayStation Vita games (E–H)
- List of PlayStation Vita games (I–L)
- List of PlayStation Vita games (M–O)
- List of PlayStation Vita games (P–R)
- List of PlayStation Vita games (S)
- List of PlayStation Vita games (T–V)
- List of PlayStation Vita games (W–Z)
- List of cancelled PlayStation Vita games
