= Lists of PlayStation Vita games =

These are lists of games for the PlayStation Vita that are distributed through retail via flash storage as well as downloadable from the PlayStation Store. While the PlayStation Vita additionally plays some games of the PlayStation Portable, original PlayStation, PlayStation minis, PC Engine (as purchasable downloads available on Japan PSN only) and PlayStation Mobile, and is able to play PlayStation 4 games through Remote Play and a selection of PlayStation 3 games through Remote Play or PlayStation Now, these lists contain only games that were developed specifically for the system itself.

Physical cartridge retail games are region free and can be played on any device; digitally distributed games and downloadable content are, however, restricted by the PSN region the user's account is associated with. Although there are no hardware restrictions on the type of regional account that can be used, this page lists the release date of games within the North American, European and Japanese regions.

All PS Vita game formats (physical/digital) can be played with the PlayStation TV; however, for various reasons (i.e., incompatibility with motion sensor/camera) not all games are compatible with it (the touchpad can be emulated on the PS TV). The lists have a column denoting compatibility with the microconsole.

Games that were announced, but cancelled prior to release, are documented at the list of cancelled PlayStation Vita games.

There are currently 1732 (Note: This number is always up to date by this script.) games across the lists of PlayStation Vita games.

== List of games ==
- List of PlayStation Vita games (A–D)
- List of PlayStation Vita games (E–H)
- List of PlayStation Vita games (I–L)
- List of PlayStation Vita games (M–O)
- List of PlayStation Vita games (P–R)
- List of PlayStation Vita games (S)
- List of PlayStation Vita games (T–V)
- List of PlayStation Vita games (W–Z)
