= Deadbolt (disambiguation) =

A deadbolt is a type of locking mechanism.

Deadbolt may also refer to:

- Deadbolt (band), an American rock band
- Deadbolt (film), a 1992 Canadian television film
- "Deadbolt" (Thrice song), 2002
- "Deadbolt" (Skaters song), 2013
- Deadbolt (video game), a 2018 side-scrolling stealth-action game
- Deadbolt, a Marvel Comics character resurrected in the Necrosha storyline
