= Reventure =

2019 action adventure video game

- Developer: Pixelatto
- Publisher: Pixelatto
- Director: Antonio Berrocal
- Producers: Alberto Martín; Fali Ronda
- Designer: Javier Cepa
- Programmers: Javier Cepa; Juan Delgado; Alberto Martín; Fali Ronda
- Artists: Antonio Berrocal; Palma Sánchez
- Composer: Daniel Parejo
- Engine: Unity
- Platforms: Microsoft Windows; Nintendo Switch; Android; iOS
- Release: Microsoft Windows; June 6, 2019; Nintendo Switch; October 8, 2019; Android; June 8, 2020
- Genre: Action-adventure game
- Mode: Single-player

Reventure (formerly Lonk's Adventure) is an action-adventure video game released on June 4, 2019, by Spanish studio Pixelatto. It is an expanded re-imagining of the Ludum Dare game jam submission Lonk's Greedy Adventure, also by Pixelatto. In the game, players are sent on a quest to rescue a princess from the Dark Lord in an open world environment. Depending on the actions taken by the player, any of 100 endings can occur. The game is a humorous parody of role-playing video games, particularly of The Legend of Zelda series. Reventure was released to critical acclaim and was praised for its humor.

== Gameplay and plot ==
Reventure is a 2D action-adventure platformer, mainly inspired by the series The Legend of Zelda. From the beginning of the game, players are given their quest to save the princess from the Dark Lord, who is keeping her captive in his castle. Throughout the game's open world are many items which allow the player character to perform new abilities as well as alternate objectives aside from rescuing the princess. Depending on how the player interacts with the world, any of 100 different endings can occur, which are marked in a gallery in the player's menu. Each ending takes place in a short cutscene, after which the player is taken back to the beginning of the game with a short text sequence connecting the ending to the beginning of the next playthrough. In this sense, all playthroughs of the game are canonical, and take place chronologically in whatever order the player chooses to go through them.

As the player completes different endings, the world of the game, as well as the player character, can change. For example, after rescuing the princess, a permanent shortcut is unlocked to the Dark Castle; after dying in a pit of spikes, following the ending the player character will be visibly bloodied and covered in spikes; these changes can even include the player character being completely replaced. The end goal of the game is to unlock every ending, as well as complete a post-100 endings sequence and find several secrets in order to get the game to 125% completion, unlocking one final ending that puts the game at its full 150% completion. The game also features integration with Twitch, allowing viewers to interact with the game.

In 2020, Pixelatto released a free-to-play version of the game on Android which starts the player with 3 lives, giving them an additional one every hour, with the option to skip the wait by watching an ad.

== Development and release ==
Reventure was originally developed for the Ludum Dare game jam of 2017, at which point it was titled Lonk's Greedy Adventure (in reference to Link from The Legend of Zelda). This version of the game was entirely different from the full release, featuring only six endings and taking place in an almost entirely different world. Lonk's Greedy Adventure scored third among all the entries of the jam, spurring on Pixelatto founder Javi Cepa to develop the concept into a larger game.

After six months of development an early access version of the game titled Lonk's Adventure featuring 50 endings was made available to the public in October 2018. The name was later changed to Reventure to avoid a brand conflict.

== Reception ==
Reventure received critical acclaim, aggregating a score of 83/100 on Metacritic. Daniel Weissenberger of Game Critics called it "a masterpiece of design." Critics gave particularly strong praise to the game's sense of humor.

== Legacy ==
Following the release of Reventure, Pixelatto sparked controversy over the release of effortless shovelware titles such as Nothing, Something and Borıng. on Steam, with the speculation that someone within Pixelatto was "trying to intentionally tank the brand". Especially Borıng. was poorly received by critics due to the use of AI-generated content and for the fact that the credits were sold as a separate DLC.

In May 2026, Pixelatto released a spiritual successor to Reventure called Moventure.

== See also ==
- Rogue Legacy, another game which features the player character being taken over by an heir after death
