= List of PlayStation Vita games (P–R) =

List of games for the PlayStation Vita.

== Games list (P–R) ==
There are currently 1731 games across the lists of PlayStation Vita games.

For a chronological list, click the sort button in any of the available region's columns. Games dated December 17, 2011 (JP), February 15, 2012 (NA), and February 22, 2012 (EU) are launch titles of each region respectively.

Title	Genre(s)	Developer(s)	Publisher(s)	Release date			PS TV compat.	Ref.
Title	Genre(s)	Developer(s)	Publisher(s)	North America	Europe	Japan	PS TV compat.	Ref.
Pachi Pachi On A Roll	Puzzle	Hidden Trap	Hidden Trap	Feb 18, 2021	Feb 18, 2021	Feb 18, 2021	No	
Paint Park Plus	Application	Sony Computer Entertainment	Sony Computer Entertainment	Jun 4, 2013	Jun 4, 2013	Dec 26, 2012	No	
Panda Run	Sports	4Hit	4Hit	Jun 30, 2016	Dec 9, 2015	Unreleased	No	
Panic Palette	Visual novel	Takuyo	Takuyo	Unreleased	Unreleased	Dec 13, 2018	No	
Pantsu Hunter: Back to the 90s	Adventure	Ascension Dream	Sometimes You	Aug 28, 2019	Aug 28, 2019	Unreleased	No	
Papers, Please	Puzzle	3909	3909	Dec 12, 2017	Dec 12, 2017	Unreleased	No	
Paradox Soul	Metroidvania	Ratalaika Games	Ratalaika Games	Jul 3, 2019	Jul 3, 2019	Jul 3, 2019	Yes	
Paranautical Activity	Third-person shooter, roguelike	Code Avarice, Digerati	Digerati (NA/EU); CrossFunction (JP)	May 31, 2016	May 31, 2016	Dec 21, 2016	No	
Parfait	Visual novel	Giga; Daidai	Technical Group Laboratory	Unreleased	Unreleased	Feb 26, 2015	Yes	
Pato Box	Fighting	Bromio	Bromio	Sep 18, 2018	Unreleased	Unreleased	No	
Peasant Knight	Platform	4AM Games, Ratalaika Games	Ratalaika Games	Mar 19, 2019	Mar 20, 2019	Unreleased	No	
Penny-Punching Princess	Role-playing	Nippon Ichi Software	Nippon Ichi Software	Apr 4, 2018	Mar 30, 2018	Nov 24, 2016	Yes	
Perils of Baking: Refrosted	Action	Lillymo Games	Lillymo Games	Oct 23, 2018	Nov 9, 2018	Unreleased	No	
Period Cube: Shackles of Amadeus	Otome game	Otomate	Idea Factory (JP); Aksys Games (NA/EU)	Apr 28, 2017	Apr 28, 2017	May 19, 2016	Yes	
Persona 3: Dancing in Moonlight	Rhythm	Atlus	Atlus	Dec 4, 2018	Dec 4, 2018	May 24, 2018	Yes	
Persona 4: Dancing All Night	Rhythm	Atlus, Dingo Inc.	Atlus (JP/NA); NIS America (EU)	Sep 29, 2015	Nov 6, 2015	Jun 25, 2015	Yes	
Persona 4 Golden	Role-playing	Atlus	Atlus (JP/NA); NIS America (EU)	Nov 20, 2012	Feb 22, 2013	Jun 14, 2012	Yes	
Persona 5: Dancing in Starlight	Rhythm	Atlus	Atlus	Dec 4, 2018	Dec 4, 2018	May 24, 2018	Yes	
Phantasy Star Nova	Action role-playing	tri-Ace	Sega	Unreleased	Unreleased	Nov 27, 2014	Yes	
Phantasy Star Online 2	MMORPG	Sega	Sega	Unreleased	Unreleased	Feb 28, 2013	No	
Phantom Breaker: Battle Grounds	Beat 'em up	5pb.	5pb.	Aug 12, 2014	Jul 30, 2014	Feb 27, 2014	Yes	
Phineas and Ferb: Day of Doofensmirtz	Platform	Virtual Toys	Sony Computer Entertainment	Nov 10, 2015	Nov 11, 2015	Unreleased	No	
Photo Kano Kiss	Dating sim	Dingo Inc., Enterbrain	Kadokawa Games	Unreleased	Unreleased	Apr 25, 2013	No	
Photo Kano Kiss AR	Application	Dingo Inc.	Kadokawa Games	Unreleased	Unreleased	Dec 20, 2012	No	
Photon Cubed	Puzzle	Smileaxe	Smileaxe	Unreleased	Unreleased	Jun 29, 2017	No	
Pic-a-Pix Classic	Puzzle	Lightwood Games	Lightwood Games	Feb 26, 2019	Unreleased	Unreleased	No	
Pic-a-Pix Classic 2	Puzzle	Lightwood Games	Lightwood Games	Nov 26, 2019	Unreleased	Unreleased	No	
Pic-a-Pix Color	Puzzle	Lightwood Games	Lightwood Games	Apr 24, 2018	Apr 25, 2018	Unreleased	Yes	
Pic-a-Pix Color 2	Puzzle	Lightwood Games	Lightwood Games	Jul 9, 2019	Unreleased	Unreleased	No	
Pic-a-Pix Pieces	Puzzle	Lightwood Games	Lightwood Games	Jan 8, 2019	Unreleased	Mar 20, 2019	No	
Pic-a-Pix Pieces 2	Puzzle	Lightwood Games	Lightwood Games	Jun 30, 2020	Unreleased	Unreleased	No	
Picotto Knights	Action role-playing	GungHo Online Entertainment	GungHo Online Entertainment	Unreleased	Unreleased	Sep 20, 2012	No	
Piofiore no Banshō	Otome game	Otomate	Idea Factory	Unreleased	Unreleased	Aug 30, 2018	Yes	
The Pinball Arcade	Pinball	FarSight Studios	FarSight Studios	Apr 10, 2012	Jul 11, 2012	Unreleased	Yes	
Pinball Heroes: Complete	Pinball	San Diego Studio	Sony Computer Entertainment	Jul 2, 2013	Jul 3, 2013	Unreleased	Yes	
Pirate Solitaire	Puzzle	Creobit	4Hit	Mar 1, 2016	Nov 17, 2015	Unreleased	No	
Pixel Hunter	Sidescroller	Lemondo Entertainment	Lemondo Entertainment	Mar 8, 2016	Nov 20, 2015	Unreleased	Yes	
Pixeljunk Monsters Ultimate HD	Tower defense	Double Eleven: Q-Games	Double Eleven	Jul 30, 2013	Jul 31, 2013	Nov 26, 2013	Yes	
Pixeljunk Shooter Ultimate	Shooter	Double Eleven: Q-Games	Double Eleven	Jun 3, 2014	Jun 4, 2014	Jun 18, 2014	Yes	
Pix the Cat	Arcade	Pastagames	Pastagames	Oct 7, 2014	Oct 8, 2014	Nov 12, 2014	Yes	
Plague Road	Roguelike	Arcade Distillery	Arcade Distillery	Jun 6, 2017	Sep 19, 2017	Unreleased	Yes	
Planet RIX-13	Adventure	Sometimes You	Sometimes You	Jan 16, 2019	Jan 16, 2019	Unreleased	No	
Plantera	Simulation	VaragtP; Ratalaika Games	Ratalaika Games	May 23, 2017	May 24, 2017	Unreleased	No	
Plants vs. Zombies	Tower defense	PopCap Games	Electronic Arts	Feb 21, 2012	Feb 22, 2012	Unreleased	Yes	
Plastic Memories	Visual novel	5pb.	5pb.	Unreleased	Unreleased	Oct 13, 2016	Yes	
PlayStation All-Stars Battle Royale	Fighting	SuperBot Entertainment; Santa Monica Studio; Bluepoint Games	Sony Computer Entertainment	Nov 20, 2012	Nov 21, 2012	Jan 31, 2013	No	
Playstation Home Arcade	Arcade	Sony Computer Entertainment	Sony Computer Entertainment	Feb 5, 2013	No	No	No	
PlayStation Vita Pets	Pet-raising simulation	Spiral House; XDev	Sony Computer Entertainment	Jun 3, 2014	Jun 4, 2014	Unreleased	No	
Pocket God vs. Desert Ashes	Tower defense	Nine Tales Digital, Bolt Creative	Nine Tales Digital	Oct 20, 2015	Unreleased	Unreleased	Yes	
Pocket RPG	Role-playing	Crescent Moon Games	Tasty Poison Games	Nov 25, 2014	Nov 26, 2014	Unreleased	Yes	
Polara	Platform	Flyhigh Works	Flyhigh Works (JP); Qubic Games (NA)	Jul 25, 2017	Unreleased	Jul 31, 2015	Yes	
Poltergeist: A Pixelated Horror	Puzzle	Glitchy Pixel	Glitchy Pixel	Oct 28, 2014	Feb 25, 2015	Unreleased	Yes	
Possession Magenta	Otome game	HuneX	Comfort	Unreleased	Unreleased	May 28, 2015	Yes	
Power Pro Stadium	Card game	Baseball Content Studio	Konami	Unreleased	Unreleased	Jun 26, 2013	Yes	
PoxNora	Turn-based strategy	Desert Owl Games	Desert Owl Games	Oct 31, 2017	Unreleased	Unreleased	No	
Present for You	Visual novel	Nail	Daidai Inc.	Unreleased	Unreleased	Oct 25, 2012	Yes	
PriministAr	Visual novel	Hooksoft	Entergram	Unreleased	Unreleased	Sep 29, 2016	Yes	
Prince of Stride	Otome game	Vridge, Kadokawa Games	Kadokawa Games	Unreleased	Unreleased	Jul 9, 2015	Yes	
Princess Arthur	Otome game	Otomate	Idea Factory	Unreleased	Unreleased	Feb 26, 2014	Yes	
Princess Strike!	Visual novel	Atu Works	Daidai	Unreleased	Unreleased	May 16, 2013	Yes	
Project Root	Shoot 'em up	OPQAM	JP: CrossFunction; WW: Reverb Triple XP	Apr 28, 2015	Apr 29, 2015	Mar 25, 2016	No	
Pro Yakyū Spirits 2012	Sports	Baseball Content Studio	Konami	Unreleased	Unreleased	Mar 29, 2012	No	
Pro Yakyū Spirits 2013	Sports	Baseball Content Studio	Konami	Unreleased	Unreleased	Mar 20, 2013	Yes	
Pro Yakyū Spirits 2014	Sports	Baseball Content Production	Konami	Unreleased	Unreleased	Mar 20, 2014	Yes	
Pro Yakyū Spirits 2015	Sports	Baseball Content Production	Konami	Unreleased	Unreleased	Mar 26, 2015	Yes	
Pro Yakyū Spirits 2019	Sports	Baseball Content Production	Konami	Unreleased	Unreleased	Jul 18, 2019	Yes	
Proteus	Exploration	Ed Key; David Kanaga; Curve Studios	Curve Digital	Oct 29, 2013	Oct 30, 2013	Unreleased	Yes	
Psychedelica of the Ashen Hawk	Visual novel	Otomate	JP: Idea Factory; WW: Aksys Games	Jun 29, 2018	Jun 29, 2018	Sep 29, 2016	Yes	
Psychedelica of the Black Butterfly	Visual novel	Otomate	JP: Idea Factory; WW: Aksys Games	Apr 24, 2018	Apr 27, 2018	Jan 29, 2015	Yes	
PsychicEmotion6	Otome game	Otomate	Idea Factory	Unreleased	Unreleased	Oct 6, 2016	Yes	
Psycho-Pass: Mandatory Happiness	Visual novel	Unico	JP: 5pb.; WW: NIS America	Sep 13, 2016	Sep 16, 2016	Mar 24, 2016	Yes	
Puddle	Puzzle-platform	Neko Entertainment	Neko Entertainment	Jul 24, 2012	Aug 1, 2012	Unreleased	Yes	
Puella Magi Madoka Magica: The Battle Pentagram	Action	Artdink	Bandai Namco Games	Unreleased	Unreleased	Dec 19, 2013	Yes	
PulzAR	Puzzle	Exient Entertainment; XDev	Sony Computer Entertainment	Jun 12, 2012	Jun 13, 2012	Aug 23, 2012	No	
Pumped BMX +	Platform	Yeah, Us!; Curve Studios	Curve Digital	Sep 22, 2015	Sep 22, 2015	Unreleased	No	
Punch Line	Adventure	5pb.	5pb.	Sep 25, 2018	Aug 31, 2018	Apr 28, 2016	Yes	
Pure Chess	Board game	VooFoo Studios	Ripstone	May 29, 2012	Apr 11, 2012	Unreleased	Yes	
Puramai Wars V	Visual novel	ASa Project	Entergram	Unreleased	Unreleased	Aug 25, 2016	Yes	
Pushy and Pully in Blockland	Puzzle	Resistance Studio	EastAsiaSoft	Jul 1, 2021	Jul 1, 2021	Jul 1, 2021	No	
Putty Squad	Platform	System 3; East Point Software	Maximum Games	Apr 29, 2014	Apr 16, 2014	Unreleased	No	
Puyo Puyo Tetris	Puzzle	Sonic Team	Sega	Unreleased	Unreleased	Feb 6, 2014	Yes	
Puzzle by Nikoli V Slitherlink	Puzzle	Hamster Corporation	Hamster Corporation	Jul 30, 2013	Unreleased	May 9, 2012	Yes	
Puzzle by Nikoli V Sudoku	Puzzle	Hamster Corporation	Hamster Corporation	Mar 12, 2013	Unreleased	Feb 8, 2012	Yes	
Q*bert Rebooted	Puzzle	Gonzo Games; Sideline Amusements	Loot Interactive	Feb 17, 2015	Feb 18, 2015	Unreleased	Yes	
The Quiet Collection	Adventure	Nostatic Software	Nostatic Software	Aug 18, 2015	Oct 6, 2015	Unreleased	Yes	
Quell Memento	Puzzle	Fallen Tree Games	Fallen Tree Games	Jun 4, 2013	May 29, 2013	Unreleased	Yes	
Rabi Laby	Puzzle	Silver Star	Silver Star	Unreleased	Unreleased	Jul 20, 2017	No	
Rabi-Ribi	Platform	CreSpirit	NA: Sekai Project; EU: PQube	Oct 31, 2017	Sep 1, 2017	Unreleased	No	
Race the Sun	Endless runner	Flippfly	Flippfly	Oct 21, 2014	Oct 22, 2014	Unreleased	Yes	
Radio Hammer Station	Rhythm, fighting	F K Digital	Arc System Works	Unreleased	Unreleased	Jul 12, 2018	No	
Ragnarok Odyssey	Action role-playing	Game Arts	JP: GungHo Online Entertainment; WW: Xseed Games	Oct 30, 2012	Feb 20, 2013	Feb 2, 2012	Yes	
Ragnarok Odyssey Ace (Note: Update for Ragnarok Odyssey.)	Action role-playing	Game Arts	JP: GungHo Online Entertainment; WW: Xseed Games	Apr 1, 2014	Apr 30, 2014	Aug 29, 2013	Yes	
Rainbow Moon	Tactical role-playing	SideQuest Studios	EastAsiaSoft	Dec 3, 2013	Dec 4, 2013	Apr 3, 2014	Yes	
Rainbow Skies	Tactical role-playing	SideQuest Studios	EastAsiaSoft	Jun 26, 2018	Jun 27, 2018	Jun 27, 2018	Yes	
Raishi	Strategy	Klon	Klon	Unreleased	Unreleased	Oct 29, 2015	Yes	
Raishi: Konpeki no Shō	Strategy	Klon	Klon	Unreleased	Unreleased	Apr 21, 2016	Yes	
Rally Copters	Racing	Depth First Games	Depth First Games	Sep 22, 2015	Sep 22, 2015	Unreleased	Yes	
Random Heroes: Gold Edition	Adventure	Ravenous Games	Ravenous Games	Mar 31, 2020	Unreleased	Unreleased	No	
Ratchet & Clank	Action-platform	Insomniac Games; Mass Media Games	Sony Computer Entertainment	Jul 29, 2014	Jul 2, 2014	Unreleased	No	
Ratchet & Clank 2	Action-platform	Insomniac Games; Mass Media Games	Sony Computer Entertainment	Jul 29, 2014	Jul 2, 2014	Unreleased	No	
Ratchet & Clank 3	Action-platform	Insomniac Games; Mass Media Games	Sony Computer Entertainment	Jul 29, 2014	Jul 2, 2014	Unreleased	No	
Ratchet & Clank: Full Frontal Assault	Action-platform, tower defense	Insomniac Games; Tin Giant	Sony Computer Entertainment	May 22, 2013	May 23, 2013	Jun 6, 2013	No	
Ray Gigant	Dungeon crawler	Experience	JP; Bandai Namco Entertainment; WW; Acttil	May 3, 2016	May 3, 2016	Jul 30, 2015	Yes	
Rayman Legends	Platform	Ubisoft Montpellier; Ubisoft Casablanca	Ubisoft	Aug 29, 2013	Sep 4, 2013	Apr 24, 2014	No	
Rayman Origins	Platform	Ubisoft Montpellier; Ubisoft Paris; Ubisoft Casablanca	Ubisoft	Feb 15, 2012	Feb 22, 2012	Apr 14, 2012	Yes	
Real Boxing	Fighting	Vivid Games	Vivid Games	Aug 27, 2013	Aug 28, 2013	Unreleased	No	
Reality Fighters	Fighting	Novarama	Sony Computer Entertainment	Mar 13, 2012	Feb 22, 2012	Feb 23, 2012	No	
Rear pheles: Red of Another	Otome game; Adventure	Matatabi	Matatabi	Unreleased	Unreleased	Aug 27, 2015	Yes	
Re:Birthday Song Shinigami Kareshi - Another Record	Otome game	Honeybee	Honeybee	Unreleased	Unreleased	Dec 22, 2016	Yes	
Reco Love: Blue Ocean	Dating sim	Dingo Inc.	Kadokawa Games	Unreleased	Unreleased	Oct 20, 2016	No	
Reco Love: Gold Beach	Dating sim	Dingo Inc.	Kadokawa Games	Unreleased	Unreleased	Oct 20, 2016	No	
Red Bow	Adventure	Ratalaika Games	Ratalaika Games	Jan 14, 2020	Jan 15, 2020	Jan 16, 2020	No	
Red Game Without a Great Name	Platform	iFun4All	iFun4All	Jan 19, 2016	Dec 15, 2015	Unreleased	No	
Reed 2	Platform	Crescent Moon Games	Crescent Moon Games	May 5, 2020	Unreleased	Unreleased	No	
Reed Remastered	Platform	Crescent Moon Games	Crescent Moon Games	Feb 11, 2020	Unreleased	Unreleased	No	
Reel Fishing: Master's Challenge	Fishing	Tachyon	Natsume Inc.	Feb 3, 2014	Mar 11, 2015	Jul 1, 2015	Yes	
Refrain no Chika Meikyuu to Majo no Ryodan	Dungeon crawler	Nippon Ichi Software	Nippon Ichi Software	Unreleased	Unreleased	Jun 23, 2016	Yes	
Rei-Jin-G-Lu-P	Visual novel	Kemco; Dwango	Kemco	Unreleased	Unreleased	Jan 11, 2017	Yes	
Reine des Fleurs	Otome game	Otomate; Design Factory	Idea Factory	Unreleased	Unreleased	Aug 20, 2015	Yes	
Ren'ai 0 Kilometer V	Visual novel	ASa Project	Alchemist	Unreleased	Unreleased	Aug 28, 2014	Yes	
Rep Kiss	Visual novel	Giga	Entergram	Unreleased	Unreleased	Apr 13, 2017	Yes	
Resident Evil: Revelations 2	Survival horror	Capcom; Frima Studio	Sony Computer Entertainment	Aug 18, 2015	Aug 18, 2015	Sep 17, 2015	Japan only	
Resistance: Burning Skies	First-person shooter	Nihilistic Software	Sony Computer Entertainment	May 29, 2012	Jun 1, 2012	Jul 17, 2012	No	
Resogun	Shoot 'em up	Housemarque; Climax Studios	Sony Computer Entertainment	Dec 23, 2014	Dec 17, 2014	Jan 22, 2015	Yes	
Retro City Rampage	Action-adventure	VBlank Entertainment	VBlank Entertainment	Oct 9, 2012	Jan 16, 2013	Unreleased	Yes	
Retro City Rampage DX (Note: Update for Retro City Rampage.)	Action-adventure	VBlank Entertainment	VBlank Entertainment	Nov 11, 2014	Nov 12, 2014	Unreleased	Yes	
Revenant Dogma	Role-playing	Exe Create	Kemco	Sep 25, 2018	Sep 25, 2018	Dec 9, 2018	No	
Revenant Saga	Role-playing	Exe Create	Kemco	May 9, 2017	Dec 13, 2017	Apr 6, 2017	Yes	
Revenge of the Bird King	Platform	Mighty Rabbit Studios	Mighty Rabbit Studios	Nov 2, 2020	Unreleased	Unreleased	No	
Reverie	Role-playing	Rainbite	Rainbite	Mar 29, 2018	Apr 5, 2018	Unreleased	Yes	
RE:VICE[D]	Otome game	Otomate; Design Factory	Idea Factory	Unreleased	Unreleased	Jul 24, 2014	Yes	
Rewrite	Otome game; Role-playing	Key	Prototype	Unreleased	Unreleased	Aug 28, 2014	Yes	
Rewrite: Harvest Festa!	Visual novel	Key	Prototype	Unreleased	Unreleased	Apr 27, 2017	Yes	
Re:Zero kara Hajimeru Isekai Seikatsu: Death or Kiss	Visual novel	5pb.	5pb.	Unreleased	Unreleased	Mar 30, 2017	Yes	
Riddled Corpses EX	Shooter	Diabolical Mind; CowCat	CowCat	Jun 5, 2018	Jun 5, 2018	Unreleased	Yes	
Ridge Racer	Racing	Cellius	Bandai Namco Games	Mar 13, 2012	Feb 22, 2012	Dec 17, 2011	No	
Ring Run Circus	Puzzle	Kalio	Kalio	Nov 11, 2014	Unreleased	Unreleased	Yes	
Rise of Mana	Action role-playing	Square Enix, Goshow, Fixer	Square Enix	Unreleased	Unreleased	May 14, 2015	No	
RisingStar	Shooter	Planet G	Planet G	Unreleased	Unreleased	Oct 31, 2013	No	
Risk of Rain	Roguelike	Hopoo Games; Code Mystics	Chucklefish	Apr 12, 2016	Apr 12, 2016	Unreleased	Yes (1-2 players)	
Robotics;Notes Elite	Visual novel	5pb.	5pb.	Unreleased	Unreleased	Jun 26, 2014	Yes	
Robotics;Notes Elite AR	Application	5pb.	5pb.	Unreleased	Unreleased	Apr 17, 2014	No	
Rock Boshers DX: Director's Cut	Shooter	Tikipod	Tikipod	Dec 9, 2014	Dec 10, 2014	Unreleased	Yes	
Rocketbirds: Hardboiled Chicken	Platform	Ratloop	Ratloop	Feb 12, 2013	Feb 13, 2013	Apr 25, 2013	No	
Rocketbirds 2: Evolution	Platform	Ratloop Asia	Ratloop (NA/EU); CrossFunction (JP)	Apr 26, 2016	Apr 26, 2016	Apr 26, 2016	Yes	
Rodem the Wild	Simulation	Pygmy Studio	Pygmy Studio	Unreleased	Unreleased	Dec 1, 2016	No	
Ro-Kyu-Bu! Naisho no Shutter Chance	Visual novel	Vridge	Kadokawa Games	Unreleased	Unreleased	Mar 27, 2014	Yes	
Rogue Aces	Shooter	Infinite State Games	Infinite State Games	Apr 12, 2018	Apr 12, 2018	Unreleased	No	
Rogue Legacy	Roguelike	Cellar Door Games, Abstraction Games	Cellar Door Games	Jul 29, 2014	Jul 30, 2014	Unreleased	Yes	
Rollers of the Realm	Pinball Puzzle RPG	Phantom Compass	Atlus USA (NA); Arc System Works (JP)	Nov 18, 2014	Unreleased	Jul 29, 2015	Yes	
Romance of the Three Kingdoms 12	Turn-based strategy	Tecmo Koei	Tecmo Koei	Unreleased	Unreleased	Feb 7, 2013	Yes	
Romance of the Three Kingdoms 12 with Power-Up Kit (Note: Update for Romance of the Three Kingdoms 12. Includes the original game and the Power-Up Kit expansion.)	Turn-based strategy	Tecmo Koei	Tecmo Koei	Unreleased	Unreleased	Sep 26, 2013	Yes	
Romance of the Three Kingdoms 13 with Power-Up Kit	Turn-based strategy	Tecmo Koei	Tecmo Koei	Unreleased	Unreleased	May 25, 2017	Yes	
Romancing SaGa 2	Role-playing	Square Enix	Square Enix	Dec 15, 2017	Dec 15, 2017	Mar 24, 2016	No	
Romancing SaGa 3	Role-playing	Square Enix	Square Enix	Nov 11, 2019	Nov 11, 2019	Nov 11, 2019	Yes	
Romeo VS Juliet Zenkan Pack	Otome game	QuinRose	QuinRose	Unreleased	Unreleased	Aug 20, 2015	Yes	
Roommates	Dating sim	Ratalaika Games	EastAsiaSoft	Unreleased	Unreleased	Feb 1, 2021	No	
ROOT∞REXX	Otome game; Rhythm	Otomate	Idea Factory	Unreleased	Unreleased	Jan 22, 2015	Yes	
Root Double: Before Crime * After Days – Xtend Edition	Visual novel	Regista	Yeti (JP); Sekai Project (NA)	Mar 8, 2018	Unreleased	Jul 24, 2014	Yes	
Root Letter	Visual novel; Adventure	Kadokawa Games	Kadokawa Games (JP); PQube (NA/EU)	Oct 28, 2016	Oct 14, 2016	Jun 16, 2016	Yes	
Root Letter: Last Answer (Note: Update for Root Letter.)	Visual novel; Adventure	Kadokawa Games	Kadokawa Games	Unreleased	Unreleased	Dec 20, 2018	Yes	
Roundabout	Puzzle	No Goblin	No Goblin	Jul 30, 2018	Aug 1, 2018	Unreleased	No	
Royal Defense	Tower defense	Creobit	4Hit	Feb 2, 2016	Nov 25, 2015	Unreleased	No	
Royal Defense: Invisible Threat (Note: Stand-alone expansion for Royal Defense on Vita; the original game is not required.)	Tower defense	Creobit	4Hit	Mar 1, 2016	Dec 16, 2015	Unreleased	No	
Rozen Maiden: Wechseln Sie Welt ab	Visual novel	5pb.	5pb.	Unreleased	Unreleased	Jan 30, 2014	Yes	
Rugby 15	Sports	HB Studios	Bigben Interactive	Feb 24, 2015	Nov 21, 2014	Unreleased	No	
Rugby World Cup 2015	Sports	HB Studios	Bigben Interactive	Sep 4, 2015	Sep 4, 2015	Unreleased	No	
Rui wa Tomo o Yobu	Visual novel	Akatsuki Works	5pb.	Unreleased	Unreleased	Sep 26, 2013	Yes	
Run Like Hell	Endless runner	Mass Creation	Mass Creation	Sep 16, 2014	Sep 17, 2014	Unreleased	Yes	
Run Sackboy! Run!	Endless runner	Firesprite	Sony Computer Entertainment	Mar 31, 2015	Apr 1, 2015	Unreleased	No	
Rush Rover	Action	radio	Ratalaika Games	Apr 7, 2020	Unreleased	Unreleased	No	
Russian Subway Dogs	Action	Spooky Squid Games	Spooky Squid Games	Jul 20, 2021	Jul 20, 2021	Unreleased	No	
Ryūyoku no Melodia: Diva with the Blessed Dragonol	Visual novel	Whirlpool	Piacci	Unreleased	Unreleased	Nov 26, 2015	Yes	

== See also ==
- List of PlayStation Vita games (A–D)
- List of PlayStation Vita games (E–H)
- List of PlayStation Vita games (I–L)
- List of PlayStation Vita games (M–O)
- List of PlayStation Vita games (S)
- List of PlayStation Vita games (T–V)
- List of PlayStation Vita games (W–Z)
