= Cliff diving =

Cliffdiving, cliff diving, cliff-diving or Cliff Diving, may refer to:

- An activity performed by the La Quebrada Cliff Divers in Acapulco, Mexico
- "Cliffdiving", a song from the 2006 album When Your Heart Stops Beating by the band +44
- Cliff Diving, a 2012 video game for the PlayStation Vita

== See also ==
- BASE jumping, skydiving from a cliff
- Cliff jumping, jumping from cliffs with or without equipment
- High diving, diving into water from a high cliff or other relatively great height
