= Azkend =

2010 video game

- Developer(s): 10tons Ltd
- Publisher(s): 10tons Ltd
- Platform(s): iOS
- Release: April 1, 2010
- Genre(s): Puzzle

Azkend is an iOS tile-matching video game developed by Finnish 10tons Ltd and released on April 1, 2010. A sequel, Azkend 2: The World Beneath, was released on March 14, 2012.

== Reception ==
AppSpy gave Azkend an 80, writing "The original Azkend was beautifully simple and visually stunning and Azkend HD for the iPad has focused on these aspects while adding a bit more of a challenge for fans of the game." NoDPad gave it 50, commenting "Azkend HD looks beautiful from an artist's standpoint, but beneath the outside beauty is a not-so-beautiful inside. I found the gameplay to be a bit repetitive, and I would have liked the audio to be a bit more in sync and not all over the place."
