= Chronovolt =

2012 video game

- Developer(s): Playerthree
- Publisher(s): Playerthree
- Platform(s): PlayStation Vita
- Release: NA: 31 December 2012; EU: 21 November 2012
- Genre(s): Puzzle-platform
- Mode(s): Single-player

Chronovolt is a puzzle-platform game with steampunk influences developed by the British studio Playerthree for the PlayStation Vita console. It was designed as one of the flagship titles for the PlayStation Plus service on the system, and was released digitally on 21 November 2012 in Europe and 31 December 2012 in North America.

== Gameplay ==
In Chronovolt, players control the Chronosphere, guiding it through levels using the Vita's tilt-sensitive motion controls. By collecting power-ups, known as Chronovolts, in each level, players are able to manipulate time, such as rewinding the game to save oneself from a fall that would have otherwise resulted in death.

== Reception ==
Chronovolt was met with generally negative reviews. In 2013, the game currently held a score of 44/100 on Metacritic, based on 9 reviews.
