= 2013: Infected Wars =

2013 horror-shooter video game

- PlayStation Vita version's cover art
- Developer: Action Mobile Games
- Publisher: Action Mobile Games
- Engine: Unreal Engine 3
- Platforms: iOS; PlayStation Vita
- Release: iOS; September 4, 2013; PlayStation Vita: NA: March 24, 2015; EU: July 2, 2015
- Genres: Horror; Shooter
- Modes: Single-player, multiplayer

2013: Infected Wars is a horror shooter video game both developed and published by Action Mobile Games. It was released on September 4, 2013, for the iOS, on March 24, 2015, in North America, and on July 2, 2015, in Europe for the PlayStation Vita. 2013: Infected Wars uses Epic Games's Unreal Engine 3.

== Gameplay ==
The game is a third-person shooter. Players must use their weapons to clear areas of zombies and rescue civilians. The game features a variety of weapons, including assault rifles, shotguns, and sniper rifles. Players can also use a viral gun to kill enemies. The game is divided into missions with varying objectives such as clearing an area of zombies or rescuing civilians. The game also features a co-op mode.

== Reception ==
Reception

Aggregate score
Aggregator	Score	
Aggregator	iOS	PS Vita
Metacritic	50/100	43/100

Review scores
Publication	Score	
Publication	iOS	PS Vita
Pocket Gamer	3/5	N/A
TouchArcade	2/5	N/A
148Apps	3/5	N/A
Gaming Age	N/A	C

2013: Infected Wars received "mixed or average" according to review aggregator Metacritic.

Jon Mundy for Pocket Gamer rated the game 3 out of 5 stars, stating that "2013: Infected Wars is a deeply ordinary and forgettable shooter that's lifted by the novel presence of cooperative multiplayer. Even then, it still barely registers as above-average. Those specifically looking to play out a post-apocalyptic buddy movie situation on their iOS device will, however, doubtless find this a blast."

David Clarke for TouchArcade rated the game 2 out of 5 stars, stating that "2013: Infected Wars is a meal cooked ten years ago, frozen and reheated five times over, and served on a plate made out of a laserdisc copy of Uwe Boll's Alone in the Dark. You can keep your 'console quality graphics and sound.' Just give me some inspiration."

Lee Hamlet for 148Apps, like Pocket Gamer, rated the game 3 out of 5 stars, stating that "With 8 rather long and drawn out campaign levels, Infected Wars is a little too light on content for the steep price tag, though the multiplayer does provide some longevity. With some tightening up, this could become a solid third-person shooter and one of the best zombie games on the App Store. Currently though, it's not quite there."

Matthew Pollesel for Gaming Age rated the game C, stating that "In other words, not for any reason that’d be enough for me to make the leap from saying 'I loved 2013!' to 'I loved 2013...so you should too!' From any objective perspective, it's probably not worth your time, so unless you happen to be me, stay far, far away."
