= Azkend 2: The World Beneath =

2012 video game

- Developer: 10tons Ltd
- Composer: Jonathan Geer
- Platforms: Nintendo Switch iOS; Android; Microsoft Windows; PlayStation 4 PlayStation Vita; Xbox One
- Release: March 14, 2012 (Microsoft Windows and iOS), June 7, 2012 (Android), May 6, 2016 (PS4, Vita and XOne), January 5, 2018 (Switch)
- Genre: Puzzle

Azkend 2: The World Beneath is a tile-matching video game developed by Finnish studio 10tons Ltd. It is a sequel to Azkend and was released on March 14, 2012, for Microsoft Windows and iOS, on June 7, 2012, for Android, on May 6, 2016, for PlayStation 4, PlayStation Vita, Xbox One, and on January 5, 2018, for Nintendo Switch.

It follows Jules, who is an adventurer and gets caught up in a maelstrom, making her become stranded in a mysterious land. The story is told through entries of a journal, retelling her journey. The player's job is to escape one location after another, while using various objects that can be found. The gameplay consists of connecting symbols in a usual match-3 play on hexagonal tiles in overall 60 levels.

== Reception ==
Reception

Aggregate score
Aggregator	Score
Metacritic	(iOS HD) 84/100 (XONE) 67/100 (NS) 67/100

Review score
Publication	Score
TouchArcade	3/5

Azkend 2: The World Beneath received "mixed or average" reviews for Switch/Xbox One, and "generally favorable" reviews for its HD iOS version, according to video game review aggregator Metacritic.

Gamezebo said "Put simply, match-3 games don't reach higher quality than what you'll find in Azkend 2...Fans of "Bejeweled" and its ilk, and who own an iPhone or iPad, simply cannot miss Azkend 2. It sets the standard for its genre." Pocketgamer said "An entertaining and enjoyable match-three puzzler with an interesting story woven around its parts, Azkend 2 - The World Beneath is sometimes let down by poor design, but it's still well worth checking out." TouchArcade said "It's hard to recommend Azkend 2 in its current state. The board layouts are too frustrating, and the game never opens up enough to make the struggle worthwhile. It's a simple problem in a game that would otherwise be excellent, but it's also an insidious one." Appspy said "Certainly aimed towards casual players, Azkend 2 combines an interesting spin on match three gameplay with an adventurous tale." SlideToPlay said "Azkend 2 is a surprise on every level, combining puzzles and a great story for a memorable adventure." AppSmile wrote "Infused with a fun storyline and collectible power-ups, Azkend 2 is not your ordinary Match-3 title." 148apps said "The original Azkend was a twist and eye candy, but it was pretty easy to beat. Azkend 2 goes deeper. It's still a casual game, but the difficulty level increases much more dramatically even if it's so incremental it's hard to notice."
