= List of PlayStation Vita games (W–Z) =

== Games list (W–Z) ==
There are currently 1731 games across the lists of PlayStation Vita games.

For a chronological list, click the sort button in any of the available region's columns. Games dated December 17, 2011 (JP), February 15, 2012 (NA), and February 22, 2012 (EU) are launch titles of each region respectively.

Title	Genre(s)	Developer(s)	Publisher(s)	Release date			PS TV compat.	Ref.
Title	Genre(s)	Developer(s)	Publisher(s)	North America	Europe	Japan	PS TV compat.	Ref.
Wagamama High Spec	Visual novel	Madosoft	iMel	Unreleased	Unreleased	Jul 27, 2017	Yes	
Waking Violet	Puzzle	Marco Mastropaolo	MixedBag Games	Jul 3, 2018	Jul 3, 2018	Unreleased	Yes	
The Walking Dead	Adventure	Telltale Games	JP: Square Enix; WW: Telltale Games	Aug 20, 2013	Sep 4, 2013	Sep 4, 2014	North America/Europe only	
The Walking Dead: Season Two	Adventure	Telltale Games	JP: Square Enix; WW: Telltale Games	Nov 4, 2014	Nov 5, 2014	Jun 30, 2016	Yes	
Walpurgis no Uta: Walpurgisgedichte	Otome game	3Daisy	Prototype	Unreleased	Unreleased	Dec 23, 2015	Yes	
Wanderjahr	Role-playing	Workyrie Game Studio	Corecell Technology	Aug 31, 2016	Aug 31, 2016	Unreleased	Yes	
Wand of Fortune R	Otome game; Card Battle	Otomate; Design Factory	Idea Factory	Unreleased	Unreleased	Mar 17, 2016	Yes	
Wand of Fortune R2: Jikū ni Shizumu Mokushiroku	Otome game	Otomate; Design Factory	Idea Factory	Unreleased	Unreleased	Mar 9, 2017	Yes	
Wand of Fortune R2 FD: Kimi ni Sasageru Epilogue	Otome game	Otomate; Design Factory	Idea Factory	Unreleased	Unreleased	Oct 4, 2018	Yes	
Wanted Corp.	Action	Eko Software	Eko Software	Nov 17, 2016	Nov 17, 2016	Unreleased	No	
War Theatre	Strategy	Arcade Distillery	Arcade Distillery, EastAsiaSoft	Mar 26, 2019	Sep 3, 2019	Sep 3, 2019	No	
War Theatre: Blood of Winter	Strategy	Arcade Distillery	EastAsiaSoft	Oct 8, 2021	Oct 8, 2021	Oct 8, 2021	No	
Warlock's Tower	Action	Midipixel	Ratalaika Games	May 28, 2019	Unreleased	Unreleased	No	
Warriors Orochi 3 Ultimate	Hack and slash	Omega Force	Tecmo Koei	Sep 2, 2014	Sep 5, 2014	Sep 26, 2013	Yes	
We Are Doomed	Shoot 'em up	Vertex Pop	Vertex Pop	Feb 9, 2016	Feb 9, 2016	Unreleased	Yes	
When Vikings Attack	Action	Clever Beans	Sony Computer Entertainment	Nov 7, 2012	Nov 7, 2012	Feb 7, 2013	Yes	
Whispering Willows	Adventure	Night Light Interactive	Loot Interactive	Jun 30, 2015	Jul 1, 2015	Unreleased	Yes	
White Album 2: Shiawase no Mukougawa	Visual novel	Sting Entertainment	Aquaplus	Unreleased	Unreleased	Nov 28, 2013	Yes	
Winning Post 7 2013	Sports	Tecmo Koei	Tecmo Koei	Unreleased	Unreleased	Jun 20, 2013	Yes	
Winning Post 8	Sports	Tecmo Koei	Tecmo Koei	Unreleased	Unreleased	Mar 27, 2014	Yes	
Winning Post 8 2015 (Note: Update for Winning Post 8.)	Sports	Koei Tecmo	Koei Tecmo	Unreleased	Unreleased	Mar 12, 2015	Yes	
Winning Post 8 2016 (Note: Update for Winning Post 8.)	Sports	Koei Tecmo	Koei Tecmo	Unreleased	Unreleased	Mar 24, 2016	Yes	
Winning Post 8 2017 (Note: Update for Winning Post 8.)	Sports	Koei Tecmo	Koei Tecmo	Unreleased	Unreleased	Mar 2, 2017	Yes	
Winning Post 8 2018 (Note: Update for Winning Post 8.)	Sports	Koei Tecmo	Koei Tecmo	Unreleased	Unreleased	Mar 15, 2018	Yes	
Windjammers	Sports	Data East; DotEmu	DotEmu	Aug 29, 2017	Aug 29, 2017	Aug 29, 2017	Yes	
Wipeout 2048	Racing	Studio Liverpool	Sony Computer Entertainment	Feb 15, 2012	Feb 22, 2012	Jan 19, 2012	No	
Witchcrafty	Platform	Midipixel	Ratalaika Games	Jul 20, 2021	Jul 20, 2021	Unreleased	No	
Without Escape	Adventure	MaikelChan	EastAsiaSoft	Jan 14, 2020	Jan 14, 2020	Unreleased	No	
Wizardry: Labyrinth of Lost Souls	Dungeon crawler	Acquire	Acquire	Unreleased	Unreleased	Dec 3, 2015	No	
Wizardry: Torawareshi Bourei no Machi	Dungeon crawler	Acquire	Acquire	Unreleased	Unreleased	Feb 5, 2016	No	
Wizards of Brandel	Role-playing	EXE Create	Kemco	Dec 3, 2019	Unreleased	Dec 3, 2019	No	
Woah Dave!	Platform	MiniVisions	Choice Provisions	Jan 6, 2015	Jan 7, 2015	Nov 4, 2015	Yes	
The Wolf Among Us	Adventure	Telltale Games	Telltale Games	Nov 4, 2014	Nov 12, 2014	Unreleased	No	
Word Maze by POWGI	Puzzle	Lightwood Games	Lightwood Games	Dec 17, 2019	Unreleased	Unreleased	No	
Word Search by POWGI	Puzzle	Lightwood Games	Lightwood Games	Aug 7, 2018	Aug 7, 2018	Unreleased	No	
Word Sudoku by POWGI	Puzzle	Lightwood Games	Lightwood Games	Oct 23, 2018	Oct 23, 2018	Unreleased	No	
Word Wheel by POWGI	Puzzle	Lightwood Games	Lightwood Games	Jun 4, 2019	Unreleased	Unreleased	No	
Wordsweeper by POWGI	Puzzle	Lightwood Games	Lightwood Games	Aug 6, 2019	Aug 6, 2019	Unreleased	No	
World Election	Visual novel	Whirlpool	Piacci	Unreleased	Unreleased	Jul 20, 2017	Yes	
World End Syndrome	Visual novel	Toybox	Arc System Works	Unreleased	Unreleased	Aug 30, 2018	Yes	
World Trigger: Borderless Mission	Action	Bandai Namco Entertainment; Artdink	Bandai Namco Entertainment	Unreleased	Unreleased	Sep 17, 2015	Yes	
World Trigger: Smash Borders	Action	Bandai Namco Entertainment; Ganbarion	Bandai Namco Entertainment	Unreleased	Unreleased	Feb 17, 2016	No	
Worms Revolution Extreme	Turn-based strategy	Team17	Team17	Oct 8, 2013	Oct 9, 2013	Unreleased	Yes	
World of Final Fantasy	Role-playing	Tose; Square Enix Business Division 3	Square Enix	Oct 25, 2016	Oct 27, 2016	Oct 28, 2016	No	
WRC 3: FIA World Rally Championship	Racing	Milestone srl	EU: Black Bean Games; NA: Bandai Namco Games; JP: CyberFront	Mar 26, 2013	Nov 2, 2012	Jan 31, 2013	Yes	
WRC 4: FIA World Rally Championship	Racing	Milestone srl	JP: Square Enix; WW: Bigben Interactive	Jul 29, 2014	Oct 25, 2013	Jul 24, 2014	No	
WRC 5	Racing	Kylotonn	Bigben Interactive	Oct 13, 2015	Oct 16, 2015	Unreleased	Yes	
Wurroom	Adventure	Sometimes You	Sometimes You	Apr 1, 2020	Apr 1, 2020	Unreleased	No	
Xblaze Code: Embryo	Visual novel	Arc System Works	JP: Arc System Works; NA: Aksys Games; EU: Funbox Media	Jun 24, 2014	Aug 18, 2015	Jul 25, 2013	Yes	
Xblaze Lost: Memories	Visual novel; Quiz	Arc System Works	JP: Arc System Works; WW: Aksys Games	Aug 11, 2015	Jun 21, 2016	Apr 9, 2015	Yes	
XCOM: Enemy Unknown Plus	Turn-based tactics, tactical role-playing	Firaxis Games	2K Games	Mar 22, 2016	Mar 22, 2016	Mar 22, 2016	No	
Xeno Crisis	Twin-stick Shooter	Bitmap Bureau	Bitmap Bureau	Oct 28, 2019	Oct 28, 2019	Oct 28, 2019	Yes	
Xenon Valkyrie Plus	Roguelike	Diabolical Mind, CowCat	CowCat	Dec 19, 2017	Dec 19, 2017	Unreleased	Yes	
Xeodrifter	Metroidvania	Renegade Kid	Gambitious Digital Entertainment	Sep 1, 2015	Sep 1, 2015	Jan 6, 2016	No	
Xenoraid	Shoot 'em up	10tons	10tons	Jan 10, 2017	Jan 11, 2017	Unreleased	Yes	
Yahari Game Demo Ore no Seishun Love-Come wa Machigatteiru	Visual novel	5pb., Guyzware	5pb.	Unreleased	Unreleased	Sep 19, 2013	Yes	
Yahari Game Demo Ore no Seishun Love-Come wa Machigatteiru. Zoku.	Visual novel	5pb., Guyzware	5pb.	Unreleased	Unreleased	Oct 27, 2016	Yes	
Yomawari: Midnight Shadows	Survival horror	Nippon Ichi Software	Nippon Ichi Software	Oct 24, 2017	Oct 27, 2017	Aug 24, 2017	Yes	
Yomawari: Night Alone	Survival horror	Nippon Ichi Software	Nippon Ichi Software	Oct 25, 2016	Oct 28, 2016	Oct 29, 2015	Yes	
Yoshiwara Higanbana: Kuon no Chigiri	Otome game	MariaCrown	Prototype	Unreleased	Unreleased	Oct 12, 2017	Yes	
your diary+	Visual novel	Cube	Entergram	Unreleased	Unreleased	Jun 27, 2019	No	
Ys: Memories of Celceta	Action role-playing	Nihon Falcom	JP: Nihon Falcom; NA: Xseed Games; EU: NIS America	Nov 26, 2013	Feb 21, 2014	Sep 27, 2012	North America/Japan only	
Ys Origin	Action role-playing	Nihon Falcom; DotEmu	DotEmu	May 30, 2017	May 30, 2017	May 30, 2017	No	
Ys VIII: Lacrimosa of Dana	Action role-playing	Nihon Falcom	JP: Nihon Falcom; WW: NIS America	Sep 12, 2017	Sep 15, 2017	Jul 21, 2016	Yes	
Yūki Yūna wa Yūsha de Aru: Jukai no Kioku	Action-adventure	FuRyu	FuRyu	Unreleased	Unreleased	Feb 26, 2015	Yes	
Yūkyū no Tierblade: Fragments of Memory	Otome game	Otomate; Design Factory	Idea Factory	Unreleased	Unreleased	Oct 5, 2017	Yes	
Yūkyū no Tierblade: Lost Chronicle	Otome game	Otomate; Design Factory	Idea Factory	Unreleased	Unreleased	Sep 8, 2016	Yes	
Yumeutsutsu Re:After	Visual novel	Kogado Studio	Kogado Studio	Jul 23, 2020	Jul 23, 2020	Apr 23, 2020	No	
Yumeutsutsu Re:Master	Visual novel	Kogado Studio	Kogado Studio	Jul 23, 2020	Jul 23, 2020	Jun 13, 2016	No	
YU-NO: A Girl Who Chants Love at the Bound of this World	Visual novel; Adventure	5pb.	5pb.	Unreleased	Unreleased	Mar 16, 2017	Yes	
Yunohana Spring!	Otome game	Otomate; Design Factory	Idea Factory	Unreleased	Unreleased	Sep 17, 2015	Yes	
Yunohana Spring! Cherishing Time	Otome game	Otomate; Design Factory	Idea Factory	Unreleased	Unreleased	Sep 15, 2016	Yes	
Yūsha no Kiroku	Life simulation	Tose	Sony Computer Entertainment	Unreleased	Unreleased	Apr 19, 2012	No	
Zanki Zero	Role-playing	Spike Chunsoft	Spike Chunsoft	Unreleased	Unreleased	Jul 5, 2018	Yes	
Z-Run	Endless runner	Beatshapers	Beatshapers	Jun 24, 2014	Jun 18, 2014	Unreleased	Yes	
Zen Pinball 2	Pinball	Zen Studios	Zen Studios	Sep 4, 2012	Sep 5, 2012	Unreleased	Yes	
ZEN Pinball 2: Aliens Vs. Pinball (Note: DLC for Zen Pinball 2.)	Pinball	Zen Studios	Zen Studios	Apr 26, 2016	Apr 26, 2016	Unreleased	Yes	
ZEN Pinball 2: Ant-Man Pinball (Note: DLC for Zen Pinball 2.)	Pinball	Zen Studios	Zen Studios	Jul 15, 2015	Jul 15, 2015	Unreleased	Yes	
ZEN Pinball 2: Balls of Glory (Note: DLC for Zen Pinball 2.)	Pinball	Zen Studios	Zen Studios	Oct 20, 2015	Oct 20, 2015	Unreleased	Yes	
ZEN Pinball 2: Iron & Steel Pack (Note: DLC for Zen Pinball 2.)	Pinball	Zen Studios	Zen Studios	Feb 25, 2015	Feb 25, 2015	Unreleased	Yes	
ZEN Pinball 2: Marvel's Avengers: Age of Ultron (Note: DLC for Zen Pinball 2.)	Pinball	Zen Studios	Zen Studios	Apr 21, 2015	Apr 21, 2015	Unreleased	Yes	
Zen Pinball 2: Portal Pinball (Note: DLC for Zen Pinball 2.)	Pinball	Zen Studios	Zen Studios	May 26, 2015	May 26, 2015	Unreleased	Yes	
Zero Escape: The Nonary Games	Visual novel, adventure	Spike Chunsoft	JP: Spike Chunsoft; WW: Aksys Games	Mar 24, 2017	Dec 15, 2017	Apr 13, 2017	Yes	
Zero Escape: Virtue's Last Reward	Visual novel, adventure	Chunsoft	JP: Chunsoft; NA: Aksys Games; EU: Rising Star Games	Oct 23, 2012	Nov 16, 2012	Feb 16, 2012	Yes	
Zero Time Dilemma	Adventure	Spike Chunsoft	JP: Spike Chunsoft; WW: Aksys Games	Jun 28, 2016	Jun 28, 2016	Jun 30, 2016	Yes	
Zero Zero Zero Zero	Platform	Ratalaika Games	Ratalaika Games	Feb 5, 2020	Feb 5, 2020	Feb 5, 2020	No	
Zeroptian Invasion	Shooter	Josyan	Ratalaika Games	Apr 23, 2019	Unreleased	Unreleased	No	
Zettai Kaikyū Gakuen: Eden with Roses and Phantasm	Otome game	Daisy2	Prototype	Unreleased	Unreleased	Jul 30, 2016	Yes	
Zettai Meikyū: Himitsu no Oyayubihime	Otome game	Karin Entertainment	Karin Entertainment	Unreleased	Unreleased	Jul 30, 2015	Yes	
Zombie Tycoon 2: Brainhov's Revenge	Real-time strategy	Frima Studio	Sony Computer Entertainment	Apr 30, 2013	May 1, 2013	Unreleased	Yes	
Zombies: The Last Survivor	Run and gun	Infotronik Games	Infotronik Games	May 24, 2016	Apr 1, 2016	Unreleased	No	

== See also ==
- List of PlayStation Vita games (A-D)
- List of PlayStation Vita games (E–H)
- List of PlayStation Vita games (I–L)
- List of PlayStation Vita games (M–O)
- List of PlayStation Vita games (P–R)
- List of PlayStation Vita games (S)
- List of PlayStation Vita games (T–V)
