= Rui wa Tomo o Yobu =

2008 video game

- Rui wa Tomo o Yobu original visual novel cover.
- Developer: Akatsuki Works
- Publisher: Akatsuki Works
- Platforms: Windows, PlayStation 3, PlayStation Vita
- Release: JP: June 26, 2008; JP: July 31, 2008
- Genres: Eroge, Visual novel
- Mode: Single-player

Rui wa Tomo o Yobu (るいは智を呼ぶ; lit. Rui Calls Tomo) is a Japanese adult visual novel developed by Akatsuki Works and first released for Windows as a DVD on June 26, 2008 as a limited edition; the regular edition followed on July 31, 2008. The game is described by the development team as a "new beautiful girl entertainment ADV" (新美少女エンタメADV, shin bishōjo entame ADV). The gameplay in Rui wa Tomo o Yobu follows a plot line which offers pre-determined scenarios with courses of interaction, and focuses on the appeal of the five female main characters. The title Rui wa Tomo o Yobu is also a Japanese proverb equivalent to the English proverb "birds of a feather flock together" when written with the kanji and kana 類は友を呼ぶ.

== Gameplay ==
Rui wa Tomo o Yobu's gameplay requires little interaction from the player as most of the duration of the game is spent simply reading the text that appears on the screen which represents either dialogue between the various characters or the inner thoughts of the protagonist. Every so often, the player will come to a point where he or she is given the chance to choose from multiple options. The time between these points is variable and can occur anywhere from a minute to much longer. Gameplay pauses at these points and depending on which choice the player makes, the plot will progress in a specific direction. There are five main plot lines that the player will have the chance to experience, one for each of the heroines in the story. To view all five plot lines, the player will have to replay the game multiple times and make different decisions to progress the plot in an alternate direction. One of the goals of the gameplay is for the player to enable the viewing of hentai scenes depicting the protagonist, Tomo, and one of the five heroines having sexual intercourse.

== Plot ==
Rui wa Tomo o Yobu revolves around the feminine Tomo Wakutsu who was brought up by his mother as a girl due to a small mark he has on his body. After his mother's death, he discovers via her will that she emphases Tomo continue to live as a female, and following this, Tomo starts to go through more troubles in his life. Tomo soon discovers that he is linked with five girls who are around his age as a second year high school student. These girls happen to have the same mark he has, and also have been going through hardships in their lives. Tomo and these five girls decide to form a pact to stay together and support each other to solve each of their problems and to bring peace to their lives. Though Tomo initially hides the fact that he is male from the others, the five girls eventually discover his secret.

== Development ==
Rui wa Tomo o Yobu is Akatsuki Works' second game in less than one year. The project is notable as having a very few people credited for having taken a part in the creation of the game, and none of them had previous worked on Akatsuki Works' first title Boku ga Sadame-kun ni wa Tsubasa o.. The scenario was divided between two writers, Wataru Hino and Jō Shūdō. Art direction and character design were done by Hokuto Saeki who was also one of five main artists for BaseSon's 2007 visual novel Koihime Musō.

=== Release history ===
Before Rui wa Tomo o Yobu's initial release, a free game demo became available for download at the visual novel's official website. In the demo, the player is introduced to the main characters in the game that is typical of the gameplay found in a visual novel which includes times during gameplay where the player is given several choices to make in order to further the plot in a specific direction. The full game was first released on June 26, 2008 as a limited edition playable as a DVD on a Microsoft Windows PC; the regular edition followed on July 31, 2008. The limited edition contained an art collection from the game which includes storyboards and rough illustrations.

== Music ==
The visual novel has two main theme songs, one opening theme and one ending theme. The opening theme, "Kizuna" (絆; lit. "Bonds"), is sung, written, and composed by Marika of the Japanese musical group Angel Note. The ending theme, "Takaramono" (宝物; lit. "Treasure"), is sung and written by Riryka, and composed by Shunsuke Shiina, both of whom are also from Angel Note. A vocal CD maxi single containing both theme songs was released as a promotional gift to those who pre-ordered the limited-edition version of the visual novel, and was released with that version on June 26, 2008.

== Reception ==
The limited-edition version of Rui wa Tomo o Yobu ranked tenth in terms of national sales of PC games in Japan in June 2008.
