= A Rose in the Twilight =

2016 video game

- Developer: Nippon Ichi Software
- Publishers: JP: Nippon Ichi Software; WW: NIS America
- Platforms: PlayStation Vita, Windows
- Release: JP: April 26, 2016 (PS Vita only); NA: April 11, 2017; PAL: April 14, 2017
- Genre: Puzzle-platform
- Mode: Single-player

A Rose in the Twilight (ロゼと黄昏の古城, Rose to Tasogare no Kojō; lit. "Rose and the Old Castle of Twilight") is a puzzle-platform game with horror elements. It was created by Japanese game developer Nippon Ichi Software for the PlayStation Vita and Microsoft Windows. The game is directed and designed by Masayuki Furuya. The game's art style consists exclusively of white, black, grey, and red.

== Plot ==
A young girl named Rose finds herself in an old castle frozen in time and overwhelmed by vines and thorns. A mysterious rose is attached to her waist, capable of absorbing the color red and expelling it into the castle; by default, almost the entire castle is in greyscale, with only the red splashes from the rose and other objects resuming time or giving life to objects. Rose soon finds a giant creature. While initially afraid of the creature, she warms up to it when it goes out of its way to protect her. Forming a bond with each other, Rose and the Giant decide to travel through the castle, hoping to find out why she has this rose and answer the mysteries surrounding this castle. There is little dialogue in the game; almost all plot events are shown through vignette recaps and flashbacks, as well as reading journal entries.

Rose soon discovers that she is seemingly immortal; the power of the rose reconstitutes her no matter what happens to her body. Failure within a room simply restarts the room, and unlocking new areas of the castle sometimes requires gruesome self-sacrifices that only an immortal could unlock. The pair also finds another girl with a rose who looks suspiciously similar to Rose, Blanc, as a seeming antagonist.

== Gameplay ==
The game consists largely of platforming puzzles that require control of both Rose and the Giant, which the player can switch between, and using the power of the rose to adjust the environment. Solving the puzzles and platforming well allow the pair to proceed to the next area as well as find hidden "bloodstains" which show memories of the dead castle inhabitants. In general, the castle is grey and frozen; blocks will not fall, machines will not run, gears will not turn, etc. Rose can use her rose to store up the color red and drain it out of and into objects, freezing and unfreezing them, which allows the pair to advance. Different areas of the castle introduce different twists and mechanics, such as a watering can which can pour red liquid on plants, painting blood portraits, and traversing up clockwork towers where the pace of time can be controlled by blood. When a player attempts to advance to a new area of the castle, they need to have collected enough hidden bloodstains to make a sacrifice of blood via Rose's temporary death. The golem can fall any length without getting hurt, can walk through thorns, and can catch and throw objects including Rose herself. Players needs to make sure they use of both of their abilities to overcome the many obstacles in the castle.

== Reception ==
Reception

Aggregate score
Aggregator	Score
Metacritic	(Vita) 75/100 (PC) 60/100

Review scores
Publication	Score
Destructoid	7.5/10
Famitsu	31/40
Push Square	7/10
Common Sense Media	4/5
Metro	6/10

The PlayStation Vita version received "generally favorable reviews", while the PC version received "mixed" reviews, according to the review aggregation website Metacritic. In Japan, Famitsu gave the PS Vita version a score of one seven and three eights for a total of 31 out of 40.
