= Rogue Legacy =

2013 video game

- Developer: Cellar Door Games
- Publisher: Cellar Door Games
- Designer: Teddy Lee
- Programmer: Kenny Lee
- Artist: Glauber Kotaki
- Writers: Teddy Lee; Benny Lee
- Composers: Gordon McGladdery; Judson Cowan
- Engine: Microsoft XNA
- Platforms: Windows: Linux; OS X; PlayStation 3; PlayStation 4; PlayStation Vita; Xbox One; Nintendo Switch; iOS
- Release: June 27, 2013: Windows; June 27, 2013; Linux & OS X; October 15, 2013; PS3, PS4, PS Vita; NA: July 29, 2014; PAL: July 30, 2014; JP: April 8, 2015 Xbox One May 27, 2015; Nintendo Switch; November 6, 2018; iOS; August 8, 2019
- Genres: Platform, roguelike, metroidvania
- Mode: Single-player

Rogue Legacy is a 2013 platform game with roguelike elements developed and published by Cellar Door Games. The game was released for Microsoft Windows, Linux, OS X, PlayStation 3, PlayStation 4, PlayStation Vita, Xbox One, Nintendo Switch, and iOS. A sequel, Rogue Legacy 2, was released on April 28, 2022 for Microsoft Windows, Xbox Series X/S and Xbox One.

== Gameplay ==
The goal of Rogue Legacy is to explore a randomly generated dungeon, defeat four bosses in each of the four unique environments of the dungeon, and then defeat the final boss. Characters have the default ability to jump and slash with their sword, along with secondary abilities, such as magic attacks, which use mana. Players can also use their sword to slash platforms to make them extend.

Whenever a character dies as a result of losing all of their Hit Points (HP), control will transfer over to one of three randomly generated heirs which the player may choose between, though this number may be increased to six with a later upgrade. Each descendant carries their unique characteristics and abilities, including genetic peculiarities such as color-blindness (in which the game is presented in black and white), ADHD (in which the player moves faster) and dwarfism (in which the character is short and can fit into small gaps).

Gold found while exploring the castle can be used to improve the character's equipment and abilities, which are passed on to that character's heirs. Gold can be found by smashing pieces of furniture, opening chests, or defeating enemies. There are also various fairy chests hidden in special rooms throughout the castle, most of which require the player to complete an objective, such as taking no damage in the room, in order to be opened.

Spending gold on the manor, which appears after a new heir is chosen, can increase stats, such as health and mana, and unlock and upgrade new classes that may be carried by one of the heirs. These include mages, which can use more advanced spells, warriors, who have higher strength, and assassins, who can use various stealth techniques and have an increased likelihood of having a critical hit.

Gold can unlock the blacksmith, the enchantress and the architect, who each provide their own services. The blacksmith can use blueprints found in the castle to create new armor and equipment for the player, improving their stats. Similarly, the enchantress can use runes found in fairy chests to give the player enhancements, unlocking additional abilities such as double jumping and dashing. Finally, the architect can lock down the design of a previously encountered castle (so that a new one isn't randomly generated) in exchange for a percentage of any gold found.

Any unspent gold must be paid to Charon in order to enter the castle, though upgrades can reduce the amount required to pay.

=== Additional content ===
The game features a progressing "New Game +" feature, in which every completion of the game along a specific line of descendants increases the difficulty while also increasing the rewards offered by enemies and chests. After the second completion, the format for the name is "New Game +n" where n is the number of playthroughs since the first (begins at +2, then +3, etc.). Notably, while enemies increase in difficulty theoretically forever, bosses do not get any harder across playthroughs. Furthermore, the player cannot normally increase in power beyond a certain point, though small increases to various stats beyond this soft-cap are possible through the "Fairy Chests" system.

A number of secret bosses exist, all of which are remixed versions of each of the ordinary bosses. Upon defeating all of the secret ordinary bosses, one may challenge the secret version of the final boss in order to unlock the secret "Traitor" class, based on the first form of the final boss.

== Development ==
The game was developed by Cellar Door Games, a Toronto-based developer consisting of brothers Kenny and Teddy Lee. This was the brothers' biggest project to date and took 18 months to develop. The game was inspired by such titles as Demon's Souls and Dark Souls. Teddy compares the design to games like Spelunky and The Binding of Isaac, noting that their goal was to make the game relatively forgiving and accessible, while also allowing permanent progression. Due to the need to streamline the game, several prominent features were cut during development, including an experience system. Kenny added that the revenue from the game will allow them to focus on larger future projects.

The game cost the team about $15,000 of their own money to develop, all of which was earned back within an hour of release. Rogue Legacy went on to sell more than 100,000 copies within the first week.

Most versions of the game were done in-house, but the Xbox One version was ported by Abstraction Games.

== Release ==
In December 2014, Cellar Door Games teamed up with IndieBox, a monthly subscription box service, to produce an exclusive physical release of Rogue Legacy. This limited, individually-numbered collector's edition included a flash-drive with a DRM-free game file, the official soundtrack, an instruction manual and Steam key, as well as several custom-designed collectible items.

The Nintendo Switch version of Rogue Legacy was released on November 6, 2018.

== Reception and legacy ==
Reception

Aggregate score
Aggregator	Score
Metacritic	PC: 85/100; PS4: 85/100; VITA: 85/100; XONE: 84/100; NS: 80/100

Review scores
Publication	Score
Destructoid	8.5/10
Edge	8/10
Eurogamer	8/10
Famitsu	34/40
Game Informer	8.5/10
GameSpot	8.5/10
IGN	9/10
Polygon	9/10
TouchArcade	5/5
Wired	9/10

Metacritic gives the game a "generally favorable" score of 85/100 based on 43 reviews.

Mitchell Saltzman of GameFront describes the game as "insanely hard for the unprepared". Philip Kollar of Polygon and Mike Splechta of GameZone mentioned the short life spans of their characters, and Scott Nichols of Digital Spy expressed frustration when first starting out. Other reviewers remarked that the game actually encourages these short runs while rewarding the player via the broader progression system. Ryan Stevens of GameTrailers described the game as "[riding] the line of frustration and fun". Saltzman concludes that "difficulty may be a turnoff to those who get frustrated easily".

== Sequel ==
A sequel, Rogue Legacy 2, was released on April 28, 2022 for Xbox Series X/S, Xbox One and Microsoft Windows.
