= Deadbolt (video game) =

2016 stealth action video game

- Developer: Hopoo Games
- Publisher: Hopoo Games
- Programmer: Duncan Drummond
- Composer: Chris Christodoulou
- Engine: GameMaker: Studio
- Platforms: Microsoft Windows, Linux, OS X, PlayStation 4, PlayStation Vita, Nintendo Switch
- Release: Windows: WW: March 14, 2016; Linux, OS X: WW: July 12, 2016; PlayStation 4, PlayStation Vita: WW: February 20, 2018; Nintendo Switch: WW: October 25, 2018
- Genres: Side-scrolling, stealth, action
- Mode: Single-player

Deadbolt is a 2016 side-scrolling stealth-action video game developed by Hopoo Games, who also created Risk of Rain and Risk of Rain 2. The game was released as a demo on April 19, 2015, and officially on Steam for Microsoft Windows on March 14, 2016. Linux and Mac OS X versions were also made available a few months later. On October 25, 2018, a version was also released for the Nintendo Switch.

== Gameplay ==
Gameplay screenshot.

Deadbolt is a stealth-action hybrid that allows you to take control of the Reaper to quell the recent undead uprising. In it, players complete missions given to them by the mysterious fireplace as they become the avatar of death, with a wide arsenal of guns at their disposal.

The game centers on the player character, the Reaper, as he progresses through three sets of nine levels filled with hordes of undead that he must kill. There are four types of undead seen throughout the game: zombies, vampires, skeletons (also known as Dredged) and demons. Each set of levels is based on an undead type: the first set of nine levels focuses on zombies, the next set focuses on vampires, and the last focuses on the Dredged and demons. Although there are only four overarching enemy categories, there are over thirty-five actual enemy types. Levels vary from different settings that you would expect to see in a dark, crime-filled world: from downtrodden houses in the ghetto, to nightclubs, abandoned warehouses, and docks. The game also includes a map editor where levels can be shared on the Steam workshop.

Objectives within vary from level to level. Sometimes the player is tasked with assassinating gang leaders, investigating mysteries, or maybe just leaving nothing alive; whichever it is, there is not one way to do it. Within levels there are no set paths or sequences, giving the player freedom to complete them in any way they like, as long as the main objective is satisfied. Once a level is finished, the Reaper returns to his car and back to his safe house, where he is awarded souls, which act as the game's currency. The player can then spend these souls with the Ferryman to acquire new weapons to bring on their missions. However, souls are only awarded the first time a level is completed, and there are not enough souls that can be obtained in one play through to buy all the available weapons, forcing the player to decide wisely. In addition to the weapons the Reaper carries into the mission, he can make use of various weapons laying around the map, or taken from defeated enemies.

Throughout the levels, the Reaper can randomly acquire cassette tapes by killing certain enemy types. The tapes contain the personal stories of the Reaper’s victims and can be listened to in the safe house, offering the player deeper insight into the game’s world.

== Reception ==
Several reviewers considered that Deadbolt successfully combined some of the best parts of Hotline Miami and Gunpoint, in its blend of fast-paced violent action and tactical focus. Other reviewers also mentioned positive similarities with Hotline Miami, with the game not punishing players for impulsivity over a methodical approach.
