= Design Factory =

Aalto Design Factory
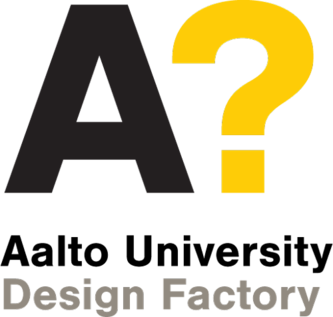
- Abbreviation: DF or ADF
- Formation: September 2008
- Type: Aalto University Factory
- Location: Puumiehenkuja 5, Otaniemi, Espoo, Finland
- Coordinates: 60.181047°N 24.831894°E
- Director: Tua Björklund
- Parent organization: Aalto University
- Website: designfactory.aalto.fi

Design Factory (DF) or Aalto Design Factory (ADF) is an experimental learning and co-creation community for education, research and application of product design and development located in Aalto University, Espoo. The stated purpose of the Design Factory is to be a constantly developing environment for learning, teaching, research and industry co-operation related to product development and design.

The director of Design Factory is professor Tua Björklund.

Design Factory is physically located in Otaniemi, specifically in Puumiehenkuja 5, Espoo, where it moved from its original location Betonimiehenkuja 5C, in spring 2023.

Aalto Design Factory is the first Design Factory established. Later, the Design Factory concept has spread to every continent, and there are currently 39 Design Factories in total. The Design Factory Global Network is responsible for networking and liaising between the different Design Factories. The members of the Design Factory Global Network share the same philosophy and principles and provide a DF environment for their local community. The aim is to be a pioneer in international university collaboration across academic boundaries.

Finland's second Design Factory, HAMK Design Factory, was established in autumn 2019 and its premises are located in the HAMK campus, Hämeenlinna.

== History ==
Design Factory was opened in September 2008 and the opening ceremony was held on October 3, 2008. During Fall 2008 and spring 2009, the Product Development Project (PDP) took place in the factory.
