= List of PlayStation Vita games (T–V) =

== Games list (T–V) ==
There are currently 1731 games across the lists of PlayStation Vita games.

For a chronological list, click the sort button in any of the available region's columns. Games dated December 17, 2011 (JP), February 15, 2012 (NA), and February 22, 2012 (EU) are launch titles of each region respectively.

Title	Genre(s)	Developer(s)	Publisher(s)	Release date			PS TV compat.	Ref.
Title	Genre(s)	Developer(s)	Publisher(s)	North America	Europe	Japan	PS TV compat.	Ref.
t@g	Application	Bolser	Sony Computer Entertainment	Unreleased	Unreleased	Feb 22, 2012	No	
Table Football	Sports	Four Door Lemon	Sony Computer Entertainment	Feb 22, 2012	Mar 8, 2012	Jun 28, 2012	No	
Table Ice Hockey	Sports	Four Door Lemon	Sony Computer Entertainment	Sep 25, 2012	Sep 26, 2012	May 9, 2013	No	
Table Mini Golf	Sports	Four Door Lemon	Sony Computer Entertainment	Apr 9, 2013	Apr 10, 2013	Unreleased	No	
Table Top Racing	Racing	Playrise Digital	Ripstone	Aug 5, 2014	Aug 6, 2014	Unreleased	Yes	
Table Top Tanks	Shooter	Studio Liverpool	Sony Computer Entertainment	May 22, 2012	May 23, 2012	Jul 31, 2012	No	
Tachyon Project	Shooter	Eclipse Games	Eclipse Games (NA/EU); Cosen (JP)	Mar 29, 2016	Mar 29, 2016	Aug 23, 2017	No	
Taco Master	Cooking	Kaxan Games	Kaxan Games	Dec 8, 2015	Unreleased	Unreleased	No	
Tadeo Jones	Platform	U-Play Studios	Deep Silver	Unreleased	Dec 4, 2013	Unreleased	No	
Tadeo Jones Y El Manuscrito Perdido	Platform	U-Play Studios	Deep Silver	Unreleased	Nov 28, 2014	Unreleased	No	
Taiheiyō no Arashi: Kōkoku no Kōhai Koko ni Ari, 1942 Senkan Yamato Hankō no Gōjū	Turn-based strategy	SystemSoft Alpha	SystemSoft Alpha	Unreleased	Unreleased	Dec 22, 2016	Yes	
Taiheiyō no Arashi: Shijōsaidai no Gekisen Normandy Kōbō-sen!	Turn-based strategy	SystemSoft Alpha	SystemSoft Alpha	Unreleased	Unreleased	Nov 9, 2017	Yes	
Taiko no Tatsujin V Version	Rhythm	Bandai Namco Entertainment	Bandai Namco Entertainment	Unreleased	Unreleased	Jul 9, 2015	No	
Taishō Mebiusline Vitable	Visual novel	LoveDelivery	Dramatic Create	Unreleased	Unreleased	Jan 28, 2016	Yes	
Taishō Mebiusline Teito Bibouroku Hare	Visual novel	LoveDelivery	Dramatic Create	Unreleased	Unreleased	Aug 24, 2017	Yes	
Taishō x Alice: All in One	Otome game	Primula	Prototype	Unreleased	Unreleased	Jun 2, 2016	Yes	
Taishō x Alice: Heads & Tails	Otome game	Primula	Prototype	Unreleased	Unreleased	Dec 7, 2017	Yes	
Takotan	Action	Eastasiasoft	Eastasiasoft	Oct 23, 2020	Oct 23, 2020	Oct 23, 2020	No	
Tales from Space: Mutant Blobs Attack	Platform	DrinkBox Studios	DrinkBox Studios	Feb 21, 2012	Feb 22, 2012	Unreleased	No	
Tales of Hearts R	Action role-playing	7th Chord, Bandai Namco Studios	Bandai Namco Games	Nov 11, 2014	Nov 14, 2014	Mar 7, 2013	Europe/North America only	
Tales of Innocence R	Action role-playing	7th Chord	Bandai Namco Games	Unreleased	Unreleased	Jan 26, 2012	Yes	
Talisman: Digital Edition	Board game	Nomad Games, BlitWorks	Nomad Games	Mar 7, 2017	Mar 7, 2017	Unreleased	Yes	
Task Force Kampas	Action	Eastasiasoft	Eastasiasoft	Sep 1, 2020	Sep 8, 2020	Aug 28, 2020	No	
Tayutama 2: You're the only one	Visual novel	Lump of Sugar	Entergram	Unreleased	Unreleased	Sep 27, 2018	No	
Tearaway	Platform	Media Molecule	Sony Computer Entertainment	Nov 22, 2013	Nov 22, 2013	Dec 5, 2013	No	
Teikoku Kaigun Koi Bojō: Meiji Yokosuka Kōshinkyoku	Otome game	HuneX	D3 Publisher	Unreleased	Unreleased	Sep 25, 2015	Yes	
Teikoku Kaleido: Kakumei no Rondo	Otome game	Opera House	Dramatic Create	Unreleased	Unreleased	Sep 21, 2017	Yes	
Tengai ni Mau, Iki na Hana	Otome game	Otomate	Idea Factory	Unreleased	Unreleased	Apr 26, 2018	Yes	
Tennis in the Face	Action	10tons	10tons	Mar 17, 2015	Mar 18, 2015	Unreleased	Yes	
Tenshitsuki no Shōjo	Visual novel	Nail	Daidai	Unreleased	Unreleased	Dec 20, 2012	Yes	
Terraria	Action sidescroller, sandbox	Re-Logic, Engine Software	505 Games (NA/EU); Spike Chunsoft (JP)	Dec 17, 2013	Dec 4, 2013	Feb 6, 2014	No	
Teslagrad	Puzzle-platform	Rain Games	Rain Games (NA/EU); Square Enix (JP)	Nov 24, 2015	Nov 27, 2015	Apr 28, 2016	No	
Tetra's Escape	Puzzle	ABX Game Studio, Ratalaika Games	Ratalaika Games	Aug 8, 2018	Aug 8, 2018	Unreleased	No	
Tetris Ultimate	Puzzle	SoMa Play	Ubisoft	Jun 2, 2015	Jun 4, 2015	Unreleased	No	
Thomas Was Alone	Puzzle-platform	Mike Bithell Games, Curve Studios	Curve Digital	Apr 23, 2013	Apr 24, 2013	Unreleased	Yes	
Three Fourths Home: Extended Edition	Visual novel	Bracket Games	Digerati	Oct 6, 2015	Dec 9, 2015	Unreleased	No	
Thunder Paw	Platform	Ratalaika Games	Sometimes You	Mar 17, 2020	Unreleased	Unreleased	No	
Thy Sword	Platform	Gamephase	Ratalaika Games	Mar 12, 2020	Unreleased	May 28, 2020	No	
Tic-Tac-Letters by POWGI	Platform	Lightwood Games	Lightwood Games	Oct 1, 2019	Unreleased	Unreleased	No	
Timepiece Ensemble	Visual novel	Glace	Entergram	Unreleased	Unreleased	Feb 23, 2017	Yes	
Time Recoil	Shooter	10tons	10tons	Jan 30, 2018	Jan 31, 2018	Unreleased	No	
Timespinner	Metroidvania	Lunar Ray Games	Chucklefish	Sep 25, 2018	Unreleased	Unreleased	No	
Time Travelers	Visual novel	Level-5	Level-5	Unreleased	Unreleased	Jul 12, 2012	Yes	
Tiny Troopers: Joint Ops	Shooter	Kukouri Mobile Entertainment, Plunge Interactive	Wired Productions (NA/EU); CrossFunction (JP)	Oct 28, 2014	Oct 29, 2014	Jul 10, 2015	No	
Titan Souls	Action-adventure	Acid Nerve	Devolver Digital	Apr 14, 2015	Apr 15, 2015	Unreleased	Yes	
Titan Attacks!	RTS/tower defense	Puppy Games	Curve Digital	May 6, 2014	May 7, 2014	Jan 14, 2015	Yes	
Toaru Majutsu no Virtual-On	Action	Sega	Sega	Unreleased	Unreleased	Feb 15, 2018	No	
TOEIC Test Jissen Tokkun	Educational	Media5	Media5	Unreleased	Unreleased	Mar 22, 2012	Yes	
TOEIC Test Jissen Tokkun 2	Educational	Media5	Media5	Unreleased	Unreleased	Apr 25, 2012	Yes	
To Heart 2: Dungeon Travelers	Dungeon crawler	Sting Entertainment	Aquaplus	Unreleased	Unreleased	Apr 30, 2015	Yes	
To Love-Ru Darkness: Battle Ecstasy	Action	FuRyu	FuRyu	Unreleased	Unreleased	May 22, 2014	No	
To Love-Ru Darkness: True Princess	Dating sim	FuRyu	FuRyu	Unreleased	Unreleased	Nov 5, 2015	Yes	
Tokushu Hōdōbu	Visual novel	Nippon Ichi Software	Nippon Ichi Software	Unreleased	Unreleased	Aug 23, 2012	Yes	
Tokeijikake no Ley Line: Kagerō ni Samayō Majo	Visual novel	Unison Shift: Blossom	Dramatic Create	Unreleased	Unreleased	Apr 27, 2017	Yes	
Tokimeki Restaurant: Project Tristars	Otome game; Simulation	Koei Tecmo	Koei Tecmo	Unreleased	Unreleased	Feb 22, 2018	Yes	
Tokyo Clanpool	Dungeon crawler	Compile Heart	Compile Heart	Unreleased	Unreleased	Oct 5, 2017	Yes	
Tokyo Ghoul: Jail	Role-playing	Bandai Namco Entertainment	Bandai Namco Entertainment	Unreleased	Unreleased	Oct 1, 2015	Yes	
Tokyo Onmyōji: Tengenjibashi Ryō no Baai V Edition	Otome game	Tyrant	Dramatic Create	Unreleased	Unreleased	Sep 17, 2015	Yes	
Tokyo Tattoo Girls	Simulation	Sushi Typhoon Games	Nikkatsu (JP); NIS America (NA/EU)	Nov 14, 2017	Nov 17, 2017	Sep 30, 2016	No	
Tokyo Twilight Ghosthunters	Tactical role-playing	Now Production, Toybox	Arc System Works (JP); Aksys Games (NA); NIS America (EU)	Mar 10, 2015	Mar 13, 2015	Apr 10, 2014	Yes	
Tokyo Twilight Ghost Hunters: Daybreak Special Gigs (Note: Update for Tokyo Twilight Ghost Hunters.)	Tactical role-playing	Now Production, Toybox	Arc System Works (JP); Aksys Games (NA); NIS America (EU)	Sep 20, 2016	Oct 21, 2016	Nov 26, 2015	Yes	
Tokyo Xanadu	Action role-playing	Nihon Falcom	Nihon Falcom (JP); Aksys Games (NA/EU)	Jun 30, 2017	Jun 30, 2017	Sep 30, 2015	Yes	
Tokyo Yamanote Boys for V: Fan Disk	Otome game	Rejet	Rejet	Unreleased	Unreleased	Aug 31, 2017	Yes	
Tokyo Yamanote Boys for V: Main Disk	Otome game	Rejet	Rejet	Unreleased	Unreleased	Jun 22, 2017	Yes	
Tonari ni Kanojo no Iru Shiawase: Two Farce	Visual novel	Prekano	Entergram	Unreleased	Unreleased	Nov 22, 2017	Yes	
Tonari ni Kanojo no Iru Shiawase: Winter Guest	Visual novel	Entergram	Entergram	Unreleased	Unreleased	Jun 28, 2018	Yes	
Torikago no Marriage: Hatsukoi no Tsubasa	Otome game	Kalmia8	Dramatic Create	Unreleased	Unreleased	Nov 24, 2016	Yes	
Torne	Application	Sony Computer Entertainment	Sony Computer Entertainment	Unreleased	Unreleased	Dec 20, 2012	No	
Top Darts	Sports	Devil's Detail	Sony Computer Entertainment	Unreleased	Feb 22, 2012	Unreleased	No	
Top Trumps Turbo	Card game	Nyx Digital	Funbox Media	Unreleased	Jun 30, 2017	Unreleased	No	
Toro's Friend Network	Simulation/RPG	Japan Studio	Sony Computer Entertainment	Jun 4, 2013	Unreleased	Dec 17, 2011	No	
Torquel	Platform	Full Power Side Attack	Playism	Aug 11, 2015	Jul 1, 2015	Dec 24, 2014	Yes	
Total Recoil	Action	Eiconic Games	Eiconic Games	Jul 8, 2013	Jul 3, 2013	Dec 17, 2013	No	
Tottemo E Mahjong	Mahjong	Arc System Works	Arc System Works	Unreleased	Unreleased	Sep 12, 2012	Yes	
Touch Battle Sensha SP	Shooter	Silver Star	Silver Star	Unreleased	Unreleased	Mar 11, 2015	No	
Touch My Katamari	Action	Bandai Namco Games	Bandai Namco Games	Feb 22, 2012	Feb 22, 2012	Dec 17, 2011	Asia (Hong Kong, Taiwan, South East Asia) only	
Touhou Double Focus	Platform	Aqua Style	Mediascape (JP); NIS America (NA/EU)	Mar 21, 2017	Mar 24, 2017	Jan 28, 2016	Yes	
Touhou Genso Maroku W: The Devil of Decline	Role-playing	Strawberry Bose	Mediascape	Unreleased	Unreleased	Jun 29, 2017	No	
Touhou Genso Wanderer	Roguelike	Aqua Style	Mediascape (JP); NIS America (NA/EU)	Mar 21, 2017	Mar 24, 2017	Jul 31, 2015	Yes	
Touhou Genso Wanderer Reloaded (Note: Update for Touhou Genso Wanderer.)	Roguelike	Aqua Style	Mediascape	Unreleased	Unreleased	Dec 22, 2016	Yes	
Touhou Sky Arena: Gensokyo Kuusen Hime Matsuri Climax	Fighting	Area Zero	Mediascape	Unreleased	Unreleased	Sep 14, 2017	No	
Touhou Kobuto V: Burst Battle	Fighting	Cubetype	Mediascape (JP); NIS America (NA/EU)	Oct 10, 2017	Oct 13, 2017	Nov 2, 2016	No	
Touhou Sōjin Engi V: The Genius of Sappheiros	Role-playing	Strawberry Bose	Mediascape	Unreleased	Unreleased	Apr 28, 2016	Yes	
Toukiden: The Age of Demons	Action role-playing	Omega Force	Tecmo Koei	Feb 11, 2014	Feb 14, 2014	Jun 27, 2013	Yes	
Toukiden: Kiwami (Note: Update for Toukiden: The Age of Demons.)	Action role-playing	Omega Force	Koei Tecmo	Mar 31, 2015	Mar 27, 2015	Aug 28, 2014	Yes	
Toukiden 2	Action role-playing	Omega Force	Koei Tecmo	Mar 21, 2017	Mar 24, 2017	Jul 28, 2016	Yes	
Tower of Beatrice, The	Adventure	Fairy Forest	Sometimes You	Jul 31, 2019	Jul 31, 2019	Unreleased	No	
TowerFall Ascension	Action	Matt Makes Games, Sickhead Games	Matt Makes Games	Dec 15, 2015	Jun 21, 2016	Unreleased	Yes (1-4 players)	
Traveling Stars	Visual novel	Hooksoft	Piacci	Unreleased	Unreleased	Nov 24, 2016	Yes	
Treasure Park	Puzzle	Sony Computer Entertainment	Sony Computer Entertainment	Sep 4, 2012	Sep 5, 2012	Aug 29, 2012	No	
Treasures of Montezuma 4	Puzzle	SPL	Alawar Entertainment (NA/EU); Smartphone Labs (JP)	Dec 22, 2015	Dec 22, 2015	Mar 28, 2017	No	
Treasures of Montezuma: Arena	Puzzle	Alawar Entertainment	Alawar Entertainment	Jul 29, 2014	May 28, 2014	Unreleased	Yes	
Treasures of Montezuma: Blitz	Puzzle	Alawar Entertainment	Alawar Entertainment	Apr 10, 2012	Mar 24, 2012	Unreleased	Yes	
Trillion: God of Destruction	Role-playing	Compile Heart	Compile Heart (JP); Idea Factory (NA/EU)	Mar 29, 2016	Apr 1, 2016	Jul 23, 2015	Yes	
Tsuihō Senkyo	Adventure	Nippon Ichi Software, Regista	Nippon Ichi Software	Unreleased	Unreleased	Apr 27, 2017	Yes	
Tsuki ni Yorisō: Otome no Sahō: Hidamari no Hibi	Visual novel	Navel	Dramatic Create	Unreleased	Unreleased	Nov 26, 2015	Yes	
Tsukitomo: Tsukiuta 12 Memories	Visual novel	Bandai Namco Entertainment, Netchubiyori	Bandai Namco Entertainment	Unreleased	Unreleased	Jun 1, 2017	Yes	
Tsumikui: Sen no Noroi, Sen no Inori for V	Otome game	Operetta	Dramatic Create	Unreleased	Unreleased	Jun 29, 2017	Yes	
Twin Breaker: A Sacred Symbols Adventure	Action	Lillymo Games	Lillymo Games	Mar 24, 2020	Unreleased	Unreleased	No	
Twin Robots	Platform	Thinice, Ratalaika Games	Ratalaika Games	Oct 3, 2017	Oct 4, 2017	Unreleased	No	
TxK	Shooter	Llamasoft	Llamasoft	Feb 11, 2014	Feb 12, 2014	Unreleased	Yes	
Type:Rider	Platform	Ex Nihilo	Plug In Digital	Jul 12, 2016	Unreleased	Unreleased	No	
Ukiyo no Rōshi	Action	Acquire	Spike Chunsoft	Unreleased	Unreleased	Jan 29, 2015	Yes	
Ultimate Marvel vs. Capcom 3	Fighting	Capcom, Eighting	Capcom	Feb 15, 2012	Feb 22, 2012	Dec 17, 2011	Yes	
Ultracore	Run and gun	Inin Games	Strictly Limited Games	July 21, 2020	July 24, 2020	Unreleased	Yes	
Ultra Mission	Shooter	Gumbo Machine	Gumbo Machine	July 22, 2021	July 20, 2021	Unreleased	Yes	
Ultratron	Shooter	Puppy Games, Curve Studios	Curve Digital	May 12, 2015	May 13, 2015	Unreleased	Yes	
Un:Birthday Song: Ai o Utau Shinigami - Another Record	Otome game	Honeybee	Honeybee	Unreleased	Unreleased	Dec 21, 2017	Yes	
Uncanny Valley	Survival horror	Cowardly Creation	Digerati	Feb 7, 2017	Feb 8, 2017	Unreleased	No	
Uncharted: Fight for Fortune	Collectible card game	Bend Studio, One Loop Games	Sony Computer Entertainment	Dec 4, 2012	Dec 12, 2012	Unreleased	Yes	
Uncharted: Golden Abyss	Action-adventure	Bend Studio, One Loop Games	Sony Computer Entertainment	Feb 15, 2012	Feb 22, 2012	Dec 17, 2011	No	
Under Night In-Birth Exe:Latest	Fighting	Ecole Software, French Bread	Arc System Works (JP); Aksys Games (NA); PQube (EU)	Feb 9, 2018	Feb 9, 2018	Jul 20, 2017	No	
Undertale	Role-playing	8-4	8-4	Aug 15, 2017	Aug 15, 2017	Aug 16, 2017	Yes	
Unepic	Action-adventure	Francisco Téllez de Meneses	A Crowd of Monsters	Mar 29, 2016	Feb 2, 2016	Unreleased	No	
The Unfinished Swan	Adventure	Giant Sparrow, Santa Monica Studio, Armature Studio	Sony Computer Entertainment	Oct 28, 2014	Oct 29, 2014	Oct 23, 2014	Yes	
Unit 13	Third-person shooter	Zipper Interactive	Sony Computer Entertainment	Mar 6, 2012	Mar 7, 2012	Mar 8, 2012	No	
UniUni Union	Puzzle	Nihon Kogakuin College of Hachioji Development Team	Grasshopper Manufacture	Unreleased	Unreleased	June 21, 2012	No	
UnMetal	Action-adventure	@unepic_fran	Eastasiasoft	Apr 21, 2021	Apr 21, 2021	Unreleased	No	
Uppers	Beat 'em up	Marvelous	Marvelous	Unreleased	Unreleased	Jul 14, 2016	Yes	
Urban Trial Freestyle	Platform; racing	Tate Interactive; Strangelands	Tate Interactive	Feb 19, 2013	Feb 20, 2013	Aug 29, 2013	No	
Usotsuki Hime to Moumoku Ouji	Action	Nippon Ichi Software	Nippon Ichi Software	Unreleased	Unreleased	May 31, 2018	Yes	
Usotsuki Shangri-La	Otome game	Rejet	Rejet	Unreleased	Unreleased	Nov 30, 2017	Yes	
Uta Kumi 575	Rhythm	Sega	Sega	Unreleased	Unreleased	Jan 23, 2014	No	
Uta no Prince-sama: Amazing Aria & Sweet Serenade LOVE	Otome game; Quiz	Broccoli	Broccoli	Unreleased	Unreleased	Oct 19, 2017	No	
Uta no Prince-sama Music 3	Rhythm	Broccoli	Broccoli	Unreleased	Unreleased	Jan 28, 2016	Yes	
Uta no Prince-sama Repeat LOVE	Otome game	Broccoli	Broccoli	Unreleased	Unreleased	Jan 26, 2017	Yes	
Utawarerumono: Prelude to the Fallen	Tactical role-playing; visual novel	Aquaplus	NIS America	May 29, 2020	May 26, 2020	Apr 28, 2018	Yes	
Utawarerumono: Mask of Deception	Tactical role-playing; visual novel	Aquaplus; Sting Entertainment	JP: Aquaplus; NA: Atlus USA; EU: Deep Silver	May 23, 2017	May 23, 2017	Sep 24, 2015	Yes	
Utawarerumono: Mask of Truth	Tactical role-playing; visual novel	Aquaplus	JP: Aquaplus; NA: Atlus USA; EU: Deep Silver	Sep 5, 2017	Sep 5, 2017	Sep 21, 2016	Yes	
Utsusemi no Meguri	Otome game	Matatabi	Matatabi	Unreleased	Unreleased	Jul 27, 2017	Yes	
VA-11 HALL-A	Visual novel; Simulation	Sukeban Games, Wolfgame	Wolfgame (NA/EU); Playism (JP)	Nov 14, 2017	Apr 20, 2018	Nov 16, 2017	Yes	
Valhalla Knights 3	Action role-playing	K2	Marvelous AQL (JP); Xseed Games (NA/EU)	Oct 15, 2013	Oct 23, 2013	May 23, 2013	Yes	
Valkyria Revolution	Action role-playing	Media.Vision	Sega	Jun 27, 2017	Jun 30, 2017	Jan 19, 2017	Yes	
Valkyrie Drive: Bhikkhuni	Beat 'em up	Meteorise	Marvelous (JP); PQube (NA/EU)	Sep 16, 2016	Sep 16, 2016	Dec 10, 2015	Yes	
Vamwolf Cross	Otome game	Vridge	D3 Publisher	Unreleased	Unreleased	Jun 25, 2015	Yes	
Variable Barricade	Otome game	Otomate, Design Factory	Idea Factory	Unreleased	Unreleased	Oct 11, 2018	Yes	
Vasara Collection	Shooter	QUByte Interactive	Strictly Limited Games	Aug 13, 2019	Jul 28, 2019	Unreleased	No	
Vasilis	Adventure	Marginal act	Sometimes You	Feb 26, 2020	Feb 26, 2020	Unreleased	No	
Vegas Party	Board game	Visual Impact	Funbox Media	Jan 3, 2018	Dec 8, 2017	Unreleased	No	
Velocibox	Endless runner	Shawn Beck Games	Loot Interactive	Jul 28, 2015	Jul 28, 2015	Unreleased	Yes	
Velocity Ultra	Shoot 'em up	FuturLab	FuturLab	Jul 2, 2013	May 15, 2013	Unreleased	Yes	
Velocity 2X	Shoot 'em up	FuturLab	FuturLab	Sep 2, 2014	Sep 3, 2014	Sep 17, 2014	Yes	
Venus Project	Card battle	Galat Games	Galat Games	Unreleased	Unreleased	Apr 21, 2015	Yes	
Vertical Drop Heroes HD	Platform	Nerdook Productions	Digerati	Feb 14, 2017	Feb 15, 2017	Unreleased	No	
Virtua Tennis 4: World Tour Edition	Sports	Sega	Sega	Feb 15, 2012	Feb 22, 2012	Dec 17, 2011	No	
Vitamin X: Destination	Otome game	HuneX	D3 Publisher	Unreleased	Unreleased	Feb 22, 2018	Yes	
Vitamin Z	Shooter	Namazu Studios	Namazu Studios	May 27, 2015	Unreleased	Unreleased	Yes	
Volgarr the Viking	Action-platform	Crazy Viking Studios	Crazy Viking Studios	Nov 16, 2016	Nov 7, 2017	Unreleased	Yes	
Volt	Puzzle	Nihon Kogakuin College of Hachioji Development Team	Grasshopper Manufacture	Unreleased	Unreleased	June 21, 2012	No	
Volume	Stealth	Mike Bithell Games	Mike Bithell Games	Jan 6, 2016	Jan 6, 2016	Unreleased	Yes	
Vostok Inc.	Shooter	Nosebleed Interactive	BadLand Games	Sep 22, 2017	Sep 22, 2017	Oct 3, 2017	Yes	
VVVVVV	Platform	Terry Cavanagh	Nicalis	Aug 25, 2015	Aug 26, 2015	Unreleased	Yes	

== See also ==
- List of PlayStation Vita games (A-D)
- List of PlayStation Vita games (E–H)
- List of PlayStation Vita games (I–L)
- List of PlayStation Vita games (M–O)
- List of PlayStation Vita games (P–R)
- List of PlayStation Vita games (S)
- List of PlayStation Vita games (W–Z)
