= Bomber Crew =

2017 video game

- Developer: Runner Duck
- Publisher: Curve Digital
- Engine: Unity
- Platforms: Microsoft Windows, OS X, Xbox One, PlayStation 4, Linux, Nintendo Switch
- Release: Microsoft Windows, OS X, Linux: WW: 19 October 2017; PlayStation 4, Xbox One, Nintendo Switch: WW: 10 July 2018
- Genres: Strategy, Survival game, Simulation video game, Management sim
- Mode: Single-player

Bomber Crew is a strategic, survival simulation video game developed by Runner Duck and published by Curve Digital. It was released on Microsoft Windows, OS X and Linux on 19 October 2017. It was released for PlayStation 4, Xbox One and Nintendo Switch on 10 July 2018. A sequel, Space Crew, was released in 2020.

== Gameplay ==
The player gives commands to their crew and takes them through a campaign of reconnaissance, supply drops and/or bombing missions, set in World War II on the British Avro Lancaster heavy bomber, or the American Boeing B-17 with the USAAF DLC. New upgrades and equipment become unlocked, and crew members can gain new skills as the game progresses. The gameplay has been compared to FTL: Faster Than Light. The game features permadeath on the player's crew.

== Release ==
There are two packs released as downloadable content: Bomber Crew Secret Weapons, released as on 15 December 2017, which added new weapons such as air-to-air missiles as well as new enemy aircraft such as the Dornier Do 335. The other downloadable content, Bomber Crew: USAAF, released on 23 October 2018 added a new campaign, the Boeing B-17 Flying Fortress as well as new enemy aircraft and aces. The Nintendo Switch version released on 6 June 2019, in Japan.

== Reception ==
Reception

Aggregate score
Aggregator	Score
Metacritic	XONE: 74/100; NS: 75/100; PC: 75/100

Review scores
Publication	Score
4Players	76%
IGN	8.5/10
Nintendo Life	8/10

The game received generally favourable or mixed reviews, according to review aggregator Metacritic.

== Trivia ==
If a player has both Bomber Crew and Space Crew under their account, the active crew from Bomber Crew may be recruited via the recruitment bay in Space Crew.

Bomber Crew was developed by a team of two, Dave Miller and Jon Wingrove.
