= Welcome to Basingstoke =

2018 video game

Basingstoke
- Developer: Puppy Games
- Publisher: Puppy Games
- Engine: Unity
- Platforms: Microsoft Windows, Linux, macOS, PS5
- Release: 27 April 2018
- Genres: Roguelike, stealth
- Mode: Single-player

Welcome to Basingstoke (originally titled Basingstoke) is a roguelike and stealth video game developed and published by Puppy Games. It was released on Microsoft Windows, Linux, and macOS on 27 April 2018. Its name was changed when it was released on PS5 on August 28, 2025.

== Gameplay ==
The player must escape an invasion of deadly aliens on foot, using their "wits and cunning". The player is not able to use guns, only improvised gadgets. The ultimate objective is to escape the town of Basingstoke and get "as far away from it as you possibly can". However, the game does not have a health bar, and players die if they are hit once by the aliens.

== Plot ==
It is unclear if the game takes place in the same universe as Revenge of the Titans, but the game's name was based on the initial town where the aliens invaded in that game, where it was included "as a joke". When aliens suddenly invade the town, the player character is trapped and must figure out how to escape alive.

== Development ==
The director of Puppy Games, Caspian Prince, lived in Basingstoke for a year in 2008, leading to the idea to use the name in the games he created. The game includes some real locations from the actual town of Basingstoke.

The game uses the Unity engine, and was originally planned to be released in 2015. However, the scope of the game changed during development, leading to a significant 3-year delay and lengthening of the game itself.

== Reception ==
In 2017, Julian Benson of Kotaku UK called a demo version "a wonderful idea that looks excellently executed".
