= Turbo Golf Racing =

Golf racing video game

- Developer: Hugecalf Studios
- Publisher: Hugecalf Studios
- Engine: Unity
- Platforms: Windows; Xbox One; Xbox Series X/S; PlayStation 5
- Release: April 4, 2024
- Genre: Sports
- Modes: Single-player, multiplayer

Turbo Golf Racing is a vehicular golf racing video game developed and published by Hugecalf Studios. The game was first released into early-access on August 4, 2022, for Windows, Xbox One and Xbox Series X/S. The game was released under the Xbox Game Pass subscription service on the same day.

== Gameplay ==
Gameplay of a solo game of Turbo Golf Racing, where players aim to hit the ball into the hole

In Turbo Golf Racing, players control a boost-enabled car to hit a ball to a hole on various courses. Players must attempt to keep the ball within the confines of the course and handle hazards such as sand traps and rough terrain which will slow the ball and vehicle while attempting to get their ball to the goal as fast as possible.

Cars are equipped with boosters which can be used to speed up the vehicle and wings that allow players to glide across the course. Players can also equip 'Power Cores' prior to joining a game, which provide various upgrades such as increased boost speed and changing the ball size, bounce and direction.

Courses include boost pads to increase the speed of vehicles and recharge boost, rings which launch the ball and vehicles though the air. The game contains various courses, split into 5 styling groups: Urban Gardens, Wild Heights, Industrial Drive, Aztec Run, Twisted Space.

Turbo Golf Racing features 6 distinct play modes. In the time-trial mode, players gain stars by beating set times on each course. In the race mode, players race against 7 opponents consisting of bots and humans to score their ball in the hole over the course of 3 rounds. This mode includes power-ups that players can pick up, such as missiles to strike and slow down opponents and shields to block against them. Points are gained by getting to the goal before your opponents and are added up at the end of the 3 rounds to determine the winner. In the ranked mode, players race against up to 7 human opponents to score their ball in the hole over the course of 5 rounds. This mode includes power-ups that players can pick up, such as missiles to strike and slow down opponents and shields to block against them. Points are gained by getting to the goal before your opponents and are added up at the end of the 5 rounds to determine the winner. Based on their standing the player either gains, or loses ranked points. In the casual Golf mode, players play against 7 opponents consisting of bots and humans to score their ball in the hole over the course of 5 rounds. Points are gained by determining how many shots the player needed to score the ball. These are added up and determine the Winner at the end of the 5 rounds. In the 1v1 Golf mode players play against one human opponent to score their ball in the hole over the course of 5 rounds. Points are gained by determining how many shots the player needed to score the ball. These are added up and determine the Winner at the end of the 5 rounds. In the Custom mode players are free to choose which other mode, maps, cores and pickups are available to use in the Game and whether to play against humans, bots or a mix of both.

Playing the various modes rewards the player with currency, which can be used to purchase unlockable cosmetic items. In addition, a Season Pass levelling structure allows for unlocking additional items as the player progresses.

== Development ==
After releasing their first game When Ski Lifts Go Wrong in 2019, European indie video game development studio, Hugecalf Studios, announced Turbo Golf Racing at the Future Games Show on March 24, 2022. Producer Jonny Hughes, is quoted during this saying, "Turbo Golf Racing is the game we've always dreamed of making." The game was available for open-beta testing on April 28 until May 2. On June 11, 2022, the early-access release date was also announced along with announcing an additional open-beta period that would run until June 20.

On August 4, 2022, Turbo Golf Racing released into early-access, initially releasing with 30 levels. It received its first update on August 12, adding six courses along with various cosmetic items and bug fixes.

On April 4, 2024, Turbo Golf Racing released out of early-access into their 1.0 full release consisting of 85 levels and four tutorial Stages.
