= Stealth Bastard =

2011 video game

- Developer: Curve Studios
- Publisher: Curve Studios
- Designer: Jonathan Biddle
- Composer: Ricky Honmong
- Engine: GameMaker Studio
- Platforms: Windows, OS X, Linux, Android, PlayStation 3, PlayStation Vita, iOS, PlayStation 4
- Release: Windows: WW: 4 November 2011; Deluxe; Windows: WW: 28 November 2012; OS X, Linux: WW: 29 April 2013; Android: WW: 18 June 2013; A Clone in the Dark; PS3, PS Vita: NA: 23 July 2013; EU: 24 July 2013; JP: 26 August 2014; iOS: WW: 14 November 2013; Ultimate Edition; PlayStation 4: NA: 18 March 2014; EU: 19 March 2014; JP: 26 August 2014
- Genres: Platform, stealth
- Mode: Single-player

Stealth Bastard: Tactical Espionage Arsehole, also known as Stealth Inc: A Clone in the Dark, is a 2011 platform video game developed and published by Curve Studios. Its mechanics revolve around stealth, and the gameplay has been likened to that of Metal Gear Solid and Super Meat Boy.

A sequel, Stealth Inc 2: A Game of Clones, was released in 2014.

== Gameplay ==
The player controls a goggle-wearing clone who must make his way through a testing facility filled with hazards and robot sentries by staying in the shadows, risking instant death if he is spotted by an enemy.

== Release ==
The game was released on 4 November 2011 as Stealth Bastard as a free download for Microsoft Windows. An expanded version, Stealth Bastard Deluxe, was released for Windows via Steam the following November. It subsequently became available for OS X and Linux in April 2013 along with The Teleporter Chambers downloadable content released the previous month. In June 2013, it was released for Android as part of the Humble Bundle with Android 6, including DRM-free versions for Windows, Mac OS and Linux and its soundtrack. Versions for the PlayStation 3 and PlayStation Vita were also released in July 2013 under the name Stealth Inc: A Clone in the Dark. Curve have also announced plans to release the game for iPad and iPhone. In February 2014 a PlayStation 4 version of the game titled the Ultimate Edition was announced. It contains two DLC expansions The Teleporter Chambers and The Lost Clones and was released in March 2014.

== Sequel ==
On 1 May 2014, a sequel, Stealth Inc 2: A Game of Clones, was announced for the Wii U. It was released on 30 October 2014. The Microsoft Windows, PlayStation 3, PlayStation 4, PlayStation Vita, and Xbox One version was also announced. The sequel, Stealth Inc. 2, was released in April 2015 for Xbox One, PlayStation 4 and PC.
