= Fluidity: Spin Cycle =

2012 video game

- Developer: Curve Studios
- Publisher: Nintendo
- Platform: Nintendo 3DS
- Release: PAL: December 13, 2012; JP: December 19, 2012; NA: December 27, 2012
- Genre: Puzzle
- Mode: Single-player

Fluidity: Spin Cycle (known as Hydroventure: Spin Cycle in Europe and Oceania) is a physics puzzle game developed by Curve Studios and published by Nintendo for the Nintendo 3DS eShop. The game is a sequel to the WiiWare game Fluidity, which focuses on controlling a small body of water that is utilized in its different states of matter to progress through the game's levels. Fluidity: Spin Cycle was released in the PAL region on December 13, 2012, in Japan on December 19 under the name Gurutto Splash! (ぐるっと スプラッシュ！, Gurutto Supurasshu!), and in North America on December 27.

== Gameplay ==
Like its predecessor, Fluidity: Spin Cycle is a 2D puzzle game with platforming elements in which the player takes control of a large pool of water. In Spin Cycle, the water source is a Water Spirit named Eddy, who journeys into an encyclopedia to save the Rainbow Spirits from a sentient and malicious ink-like substance called Goop.

Gameplay has remained virtually the same overall, with the retention of motion controlled movement, the ability to jump, and the ability to transform Eddy into either a block of ice that can smash barriers, weigh down switches and cling to objects or into a cloud of vapor that can float around freely, expel gusts of wind and electrify objects by striking them with lightning. Eddy's water reservoir can be depleted due to damage from Goop monsters and hazards, which results in a game over when his reservoir has been completely depleted, but this can be avoided by collecting water droplets to restore his reservoir.

Adding on to these features, Spin Cycle introduces a number of levels that require the player to either turn or completely rotate the 3DS in order to completely traverse them. Due to the player having to tilt the 3DS console during play, and how the 3D stereoscopic effect worked on the original 3DS model, 3D is not available during play.

== Reception ==
Reception

Aggregate score
| Aggregator | Score |
|---|---|
| Metacritic | 78/100 |

Review scores
| Publication | Score |
|---|---|
| Edge | 6/10 |
| Gamekult | 6/10 |
| GamesMaster | 86% |
| HobbyConsolas | 70% |
| IGN | 6/10 |
| Nintendo Life | 9/10 |
| Nintendo World Report | 8/10 |
| Official Nintendo Magazine | 86% |
| Pocket Gamer | 4.5/5 |
| Common Sense Media | 4/5 |
| Metro | 8/10 |

Spin Cycle received generally favorable reviews according to the review aggregation website Metacritic. Pocket Gamer's Mike Rose called the game "gorgeous", and "a must have for your Nintendo 3DS". IGN's Lucas M. Thomas called the game's controls "awkward", and called the game a "mismatch" with the 3DS's hardware.

=== Legacy ===
Eddy appears as a trophy in Super Smash Bros. for Nintendo 3DS, and returns as a Spirit in Super Smash Bros. Ultimate.
