= Explodemon =

2011 video game

- Developer: Curve Studios
- Publisher: Curve Studios
- Platforms: PlayStation 3, Windows
- Release: PlayStation 3: NA: 8 February 2011; PAL: 9 March 2011; Windows; 3 November 2011
- Genre: Platform
- Mode: Single-player

Explodemon! is a 2011 platform video game developed by Curve Studios for the PlayStation 3. It was released on the PlayStation Network. The game is also available on Microsoft Windows via GamersGate.

== Overview ==
Players control the titular hero, Explodemon, a superhero that uses his ability to blow himself up in order to destroy enemies and objects, propel himself through the air and solve environmental puzzles.

The developers have described the game as "a loving parody of badly translated action games and everything that they embody".

== Development ==
Design director Jonathan Biddle, who created the original Explodemon! prototype in November 2005 in his spare time, describes the game as "what Treasure would create if they mixed Yoshi’s Island with Half-Life 2, and is inspired by elements from games as diverse as Street Fighter II, Halo, Super Metroid and Bangai-O".

== Reception ==
Reception

Aggregate score
| Aggregator | Score |
|---|---|
| Metacritic | 65/100 |

Review scores
| Publication | Score |
|---|---|
| Edge | 4/10 |
| Eurogamer | 7/10 |
| Game Informer | 5.5/10 |
| GamePro | 2.5/5 |
| GameSpot | 7/10 |
| IGN | 8/10 |
| Joystiq | 4/5 |
| PlayStation Official Magazine – UK | 7/10 |
| Play | 70% |
| PSM3 | 68% |
| The A.V. Club | C+ |
| Metro | 5/10 |

The PlayStation 3 version received "mixed or average" reviews, according to the review aggregation website Metacritic.
