= Hue (video game) =

2016 adventure puzzle game

- Developer: Fiddlesticks
- Publisher: Curve Digital
- Designers: Henry Hoffman; Dan Da Rocha
- Engine: Unity
- Platforms: Linux; macOS; Windows; Switch; PlayStation 4; PlayStation Vita; Xbox One
- Release: Windows, PS4, Xbox One; 30 August 2016; Vita; 29 November 2016; Switch; 6 June 2019
- Genres: Adventure, puzzle-platform
- Mode: Single-player

Hue is a 2016 puzzle-platform game developed by Fiddlesticks and published by Curve Digital. The game was released on 30 August 2016, for Microsoft Windows, PlayStation 4, and Xbox One; on 29 November 2016, for the PlayStation Vita; and on 6 June 2019, for Nintendo Switch. There were further releases for iOS on 25 January 2020 and Android on 22 April 2020.

== Gameplay ==
Hue is a side-scrolling puzzle platform game. The plot revolves around the protagonist, Hue, searching for his mother (voiced by Anna Acton), who turned an 'impossible colour' due to the fracturing of the Annular Spectrum, a ring that she developed to allow perception and alteration of colour. Hue, the player character, can walk, jump, climb ladders and push or pull objects. During this journey, the player searches through multiple areas in a greyscale world. In some cases, it is required to collect a key in order to access the next room, and the player can gather Erlenmeyer flasks hidden within levels.

As the player progresses, Hue collects eight shards of different colours of the Annular Spectrum. The colours are aqua, navy, purple, pink, orange, red, yellow, and green. Players can access them in the form of a colour wheel, and picking a shard makes the background colour match the selected piece. This in turn makes certain in-game elements temporarily cease to exist if they are the same colour, blending into the background. If the colour is changed again, they reappear. These elements include walls, movable boxes, lasers that kill the player on contact, bouncing blocks that shift their colour when jumped on, slime jets that change the colour of other objects, and others. If Hue touches a spike or a laser, gets hit by a falling object or falls into the abyss, he gets sent back to the start of the room. As the player progresses, collecting more shards and unlocking more colours, the complexity of the puzzles increases, and previously unreachable areas can be accessed.

== Development and release ==
Development began in late 2014. According to Fiddlesticks co-founder Henry Hoffman, a prototype was made in two weeks. Six months later, Fiddlesticks arranged a deal allowing them to work on the game full time. During development, Fiddlesticks switched from Construct 2 to Unity, which Hoffman described as “a pretty steep learning curve”.

The soundtrack to Hue was created by Alkis Livathinos, who was making music as a freelancer beforehand. According to Livathinos, Fiddlesticks reached out to him after licensing his music for a trailer. While creating the soundtrack, Livathinos was inspired by the soundtrack to Machinarium for what he described as an “EDM sound”.

In 2022, Curve Games acquired Fiddlesticks Games.

== Reception ==
Reception

Aggregate score
Aggregator	Score
Metacritic	PC: 79/100; PS4: 77/100; XONE: 78/100; NS: 73/100

Review scores
Publication	Score
Nintendo Life	NS: 6/10
Nintendo World Report	NS: 6.5/10
Pocket Gamer	NS: 7/10

Hue received "generally favorable" reviews on Metacritic. Elsewhere, critics have praised Hue for its striking visual art style and colour wheel mechanic, with Nintendo World Report writing “The game commits so fully to its art style with strong, screen-filling colors that pop against each other that I wanted to keep playing to see more". However, one common complaint is the puzzles themselves, with Nintendo Life claiming they "don't really become complex or satisfying until the end of its journey". As well as this, Pocket Gamer criticised the game for its lack of checkpoints.
