= Stealth Inc 2: A Game of Clones =

2014 video game

- Developer: Curve Studios (Note: Nvidia Lightspeed Studios developed the Nvidia Shield version.)
- Publisher: Curve Digital
- Designer: Jonathan Biddle
- Platforms: Microsoft Windows, PlayStation 3, PlayStation 4, Xbox One, Wii U, PlayStation Vita
- Release: Wii U: WW: October 30, 2014; Windows, Xbox One: WW: April 3, 2015; PS3, PS4, PS Vita: NA: April 7, 2015; EU: April 8, 2015
- Genres: Platform, stealth
- Modes: Single-player, multiplayer

Stealth Inc 2: A Game of Clones is a 2D puzzle platform video game which was developed and published by Curve Digital. The game is a sequel to Stealth Bastard Deluxe, featuring different mechanics which involve puzzle sections. The game was released for the Wii U on October 23, 2014. The PlayStation 3, PlayStation 4, PlayStation Vita, Xbox One and Microsoft Windows versions of the game were also released in April 2015.

== Gameplay ==
Stealth Inc 2 is a puzzle platform game. The game revolves around goggles-wearing clones, in which the player takes control of multiple clones. Players explore a cloning facility in which they were born, obtaining equipment to unlock new areas as they go. The game makes use of the Wii U GamePad in multiple ways, including managing the skill and tools to keep the main player hidden.

The game revolves around working with different equipment for solving puzzles, unlike in the first game which only had goggles.

The game includes a level editor with sharing capabilities. The inclusion of a level editor is said to provide an "endless" amount of content, extending the life of the title beyond the core campaign. In addition to this, the game will also make use of Miiverse, giving players the ability to post messages that'll appear on walls within the main game.

== Plot ==
A clone escapes the test facility and finds the reason behind the existence of the clones.

== Reception ==
Reception

Aggregate scores
Aggregator	Score
GameRankings	83.93%
Metacritic	82/100

Review scores
Publication	Score
Eurogamer	6/10
IGN	8.5/10
Nintendo Life	9/10
Digital Spy	5/5
Hardcore Gamer	4/5

Pre-release reception was positive. Nintendo Life praised the game for its unique gameplay and considered it as a valuable addition to Wii U's eShop.

Upon release, the game received generally positive reviews from critics. It received an aggregated score of 83.93% on GameRankings based on 14 reviews and 82/100 on Metacritic based on 21 reviews.

Thomas Whitehead from Nintendo Life gave the game a 9/10, calling the game a much more expanded experience than its predecessor. He also praised the game's satisfying story, well-crafted levels, challenging gameplay, detailed Level Editor as well as the co-operative multiplayer mode, which he stated "has made unique use of the GamePad". He summarized the review by saying that "Stealth Inc 2: A Game of Clones is a gem from Curve Studios, and one of the very best download games on the Wii U."

Scott Thompson from IGN gave the game an 8.5/10, praising the addition of leaderboard, which increase the replay value of the game. The game's sense of humor, puzzle design and progression are also praised. He summarized the review by saying that "Stealth Inc 2 doesn't just differentiate itself from the games that influenced it; it stands out as one of the best games available on the eShop."

Chris Schilling from Eurogamer was much more negative about the game. He noted that the game is frustrating to play, and that the game features too many moments of "trial-and-error". He also criticized the game's color tone and the checkpoint system. He compared the game unfavorably to Mark of the Ninja, Toki Tori 2 and 'Splosion Man and stated that the game is "too demanding and too laborious".

As of 3 April 2015, the series has yielded more than 1 million downloads.
