= Fluidity (video game) =

2010 video game

- Developer: Curve Studios
- Publisher: Nintendo
- Director: Jaid Mindang
- Designer: Jonathan Biddle
- Composers: Richard Jacques; Allister Brimble; Anthony N. Putson
- Platform: WiiWare
- Release: NA: December 6, 2010; PAL: December 24, 2010
- Genres: Puzzle, metroidvania
- Mode: Single-player

Fluidity (known as Hydroventure in Europe and Oceania) is a physics-based puzzle game developed by Curve Studios and published by Nintendo for WiiWare on the Wii video game console. The game focuses on controlling a small body of water that is utilized in its different states of matter to progress through the game's levels.

Fluidity was released in North America and Europe in December 2010. A sequel, Fluidity: Spin Cycle, was released for the Nintendo 3DS eShop in December 2012.

== Gameplay ==
Fluidity is a 2D puzzle game with platforming elements, in which the player takes control of a large pool of water. The pool is moved by holding the Wii Remote sideways and tilting it left or right, which tilts the game world, while shaking the Remote will cause the pool to bounce upwards. The player is tasked with exploring the pages of a magical encyclopedia known as the Aquaticus, which has been infected by a dark substance called the Influence. The player must acquire Rainbow Drops, usually done by surmounting obstacles and completing environmental puzzles, in order to purge the book of the Influence.

The pool of water gains the ability to transform into two other states (a block of ice and a cloud of vapor) as the game progresses. The ice block can smash through barriers, weigh down switches and cling to objects, and the cloud can float around freely and expel gusts of wind, as well as electrify objects via a bolt of lightning. Some of the water can be lost due to damage from monsters and hazards, which results in a Game Over when all the water in reserve has been depleted, and can be restored by collecting water droplets.

== Development ==
The idea of a physics-based 'water game' was originally conceived in 2005, shortly after the formation of Curve Studios. During a development interview, design director Jonathan Biddle discussed the concept in these terms: "Water is so universal...The basics of freezing water to make ice and boiling it to make steam are things that no one needs explaining to them. We thought that all of these elements could be brought together to make a great game with really unique mechanics, and when we saw the Wii Remote, we instantly saw how it could be done".

As the studio was busy with other projects, development on Fluidity did not begin until after the 2008 Game Developers Conference. During the convention, Curve Studios met with Masa Miyazaki and Azusa Tajima, two producers from Nintendo, who signed a publishing agreement following a pitch of the game idea.

Biddle described that the Wii Remote was a natural fit for Fluidity, although he did explain that there had been difficulties in fine-tuning the responsiveness of the controls, particularly the jumping mechanism. Elsewhere, he cites the images in airline safety brochures as the inspiration for the visual style of the game.

The music and sound FX for Fluidity were created by Richard Jacques, Allister Brimble, and Anthony Putson.

== Reception ==
Reception

Aggregate score
| Aggregator | Score |
|---|---|
| Metacritic | 86/100 |

Review scores
| Publication | Score |
|---|---|
| Destructoid | 9/10 |
| Edge | 8/10 |
| Eurogamer | 9/10 |
| GameSpot | 8.5/10 |
| GamesRadar+ | 3.5/5 |
| GameTrailers | 8/10 |
| IGN | 8.5/10 |
| Nintendo Life | 9/10 |
| Nintendo World Report | 9.5/10 |
| Official Nintendo Magazine | 92% |
| Metro | 8/10 |

Fluidity received "generally favorable reviews" according to the review aggregation website Metacritic. Edge praised the simple idea behind the game and the fun it provides.

Nintendo World Report presented Fluidity with the award for 'WiiWare Game of the Year' for 2010.
