= Revenge of the Titans =

2010 video game

- Developer: Puppy Games
- Publisher: Puppy Games
- Engine: Java
- Platforms: Microsoft Windows, Linux, Mac OS X
- Release: December 14, 2010
- Genres: Tower defense, real-time strategy
- Mode: Single-player

Revenge of the Titans is a tower defense/real-time strategy video game developed and published by Puppy Games, it is a direct sequel to Titan Attacks! . It was released for one of the five games included in the second Humble Indie Bundle in 2010. As a result of the success of the Humble Indie Bundle sale the source code of Revenge of the Titans was released. On March 16, 2011, the game was released on Steam.

The game received positive reviews from critics, who commended its art style, gameplay, and writing.

== Gameplay ==
A screenshot of gameplay from Revenge of the Titans.

Revenge of the Titans plays like a traditional tower defense game but with the caveat that enemies ignore or attempt to avoid the towers that you place, increasing the difficulty. The goal for each level is to prevent the command center from being destroyed by aliens by protecting it with turrets and other defenses. The player has access to extensive research trees that they can use to develop different types of defenses against enemies.

In addition to the normal alien enemies, there are also large alien bosses that present a greater challenge and force the player to change strategies.

The game is created in a style that combines retro pixel art with modern aesthetics.

== Plot ==
Revenge of the Titans is a direct sequel to Titan Attacks!. After successfully stopping an alien race from the moon Titan from destroying Earth via their spacecraft, the aliens return for revenge, launching an all-out ground invasion. The player is the unseen commander of a military force that must stop the new invasion and then deal with the alien threat once and for all, by decimating them on Titan itself.

== Development ==
The game was initially slated to be released on PS3, PS4 and Vita by Curve Studios, but porting the game was deemed too difficult, and only Titan Attacks! was ported to consoles.

=== Music ===
The soundtrack of Revenge of the Titans consists of six tracks. Each is a synthesized version of a classical music piece.

1. March - Music for the Funeral of Queen Mary
2. Fanfare – Fanfare for the Common Man
3. Mars – Mars, the Bringer of War
4. Einleitung - initial fanfare from Also sprach Zarathustra (Strauss)
5. Toccata - Toccata in D minor (Johann Sebastian Bach)
6. Fugue - Fugue in D minor (Johann Sebastian Bach)

== Reception ==
Revenge of the Titans received positive reviews from critics, and has an aggregate review score of 79/100 on Metacritic.

Emanuel Maiberg of GamePro scored the game 90/100, calling it a "nearly perfect game" with "ingenious" art direction and "stellar" writing, while also commending the game's high level of difficulty.

Alec Meer of Eurogamer praised the blend of RTS and tower defense genres in Titans, awarding it 8 out of 10.

Nick Kolan of IGN scored the game 70/100, commending the game's depth and cleverness, but criticizing the "sharp difficulty curve" and "poor upgrade system", which he claimed would limit the game's "mass appeal".
