= Lone Survivor (video game) =

2012 video game

- Developers: Superflat Games; Curve Studios (Director's Cut)
- Publishers: Superflat Games; Curve Digital (Director's Cut)
- Director: Jasper Byrne
- Producer: Jasper Byrne
- Designer: Jasper Byrne
- Programmer: Jasper Byrne
- Artist: Jasper Byrne
- Composer: Jasper Byrne
- Platforms: Microsoft Windows, OS X, Linux, PlayStation 3, PlayStation Vita, PlayStation 4, Wii U, Nintendo Switch
- Release: Microsoft Windows, OS X: WW: 27 March 2012; Linux: WW: 7 June 2013; PlayStation 3, PS Vita: NA: 24 September 2013; AU: 24 September 2013; EU: 25 September 2013; PlayStation 4: NA: 14 October 2014; PAL: 15 October 2014; Wii U: WW: 16 October 2014; Super Lone Survivor; Nintendo Switch, Microsoft Windows: WW: 31 October 2022
- Genre: Survival horror
- Mode: Single-player

Lone Survivor is a 2012 survival horror video game developed and published by Superflat Games. It was originally released as a Flash game for Microsoft Windows and OS X in 2012. It was later ported to the PlayStation 3 and PlayStation Vita and released on the PlayStation Network in 2013 as Lone Survivor: The Director's Cut by Curve Studios. The Director's Cut came out on Microsoft Windows and OS X as a free update on 31 October 2013. In October 2014, the game was also made available for the PlayStation 4 and Wii U. The title was released in physical format on PlayStation 4 and PlayStation Vita on December 30, 2016, through Limited Run Games. A remake of the game, titled Super Lone Survivor released for Nintendo Switch and Microsoft Windows on October 31, 2022.

== Gameplay ==
Lone Survivor is a post-apocalyptic survival horror game with retro-styled 2D graphics in which the player controls a nameless protagonist following directions provided by the character's apparent hallucinations. When exploring the game world the player will discover items, keys and food. The correct use of each item and key must be determined in order to solve the game's puzzles. Certain food types can be improved by cooking and/or combining them with others. Two-way mirrors found in the game world are used to teleport back to the survivor's apartment. Players possess a flashlight with which to navigate the game world; using the flashlight drains batteries; replacements can be found by scavenging. Mutants must be avoided or killed; a pistol must be found in order to attack mutants, but ammunition is scarce. When the pistol's magazine is empty the survivor automatically loads a new magazine, leaving him open to attack during the process. Mutants are attracted to light and noises, but the player can sneak past by hiding in the shadows. The game features a map for players to navigate with, however, the game does not pause when the game's menus or map are accessed, leaving the survivor vulnerable.

The survivor's apartment serves as a hub; the player must return with food in order to survive, as well as sleep. Sleeping prevents madness and is also required to save the player's progress. It is possible to combat lack of sleep with pills; these further damage the survivor mentally but the resultant hallucination may result in extra supplies appearing in the survivor's backpack. Progression through the game requires exploration, which fills out the map; sometimes specific items must be located in order to proceed further. Failing to locate these items can result in resources being spent without new areas being opened up, making future attempts more difficult.

The player's interactions with the game's world and inhabitants result in different endings upon completion of the game. These are shown during the game's end credits, emphasizing how the player received that particular ending. A single playthrough of the game can last between three and eight hours.

== Synopsis ==
=== Setting ===
Players control a man in a surgical mask. This character is an isolated survivor of an infection which has turned his city's (and possibly the world's) population into aggressive, shambling mutants. With limited food and an increasingly fragile mental state, the player character must be guided outside his apartment to scavenge and explore. There are no indications that any other survivors exist except for a note which states that there are other survivors on the opposite side of the apartment building, and a man simply called "The Director". Time progresses, in the form of days, as the player saves, by the means of sleeping in the man's apartment (and experiencing strange dreams or hallucinations, by taking either blue or green pills), which appears to be the safest area in the entire game.

Throughout the game references are made to the survivor's state of mind. It is possible to have discussions with a toy cat, or talk the main character's problems out with a real cat that can be adopted; strange characters such as a man with a box on his head are encountered. Rooms may change appearance upon being revisited; making a wrong turn may result in a strange scene. It becomes difficult to interpret what is real to the survivor and what is hallucination.

=== Plot ===
A nameless man in a surgical mask (referred to in the game as "You") has been living in an apartment for an unspecified amount of time after a disease has turned most of the city's inhabitants into mindless zombie-like monsters. The man is alone and unsure if there are any other survivors. In the opening scene, which is a dream, he meets a man with a box on his head and a girl in a blue dress. At the end of this dream, a man wearing blue with a single gunshot wound appears before the survivor wakes up.

In the waking world the man is out of supplies, and is forced to explore for food, weapons, and other survivors. Following leads picked up from his radio, annotated maps, and discarded diary entries, the man explores the apartment complex infested with monsters. He finds a card with a radio frequency, which he uses to discover another survivor, a man who refers to himself as "The Director," who occasionally provides the man with flares, bullets, human and cat food, kitchen supplies, and electronics.

Though their encounters are brief, the man and The Director begin to form a friendship. He also encounters multiple times the girl from his dreams, who he claims seems familiar. As he explores, a series of bizarre, seemingly paranormal events occur and it seems the man is struggling with his sanity. After many days spent possibly dreaming of the man in blue or the man who wears a box, and many nights spent in confrontation with a large and aggressive monster, the man is able to leave the apartment safely, and begin to explore the city.

The Director tells him that he is going to leave the city. Determined to get past a crashed bus, the man gathers supplies so he may open the bus door. Not sure what to expect, the man is attacked by a large, screaming monster with scythe-like arms known as Mother. After a brief confrontation, the monster flees and the man finds The Director mortally wounded. In their final conversation, The Director tells him that he should go to the hospital, and gives him the hospital's security code.

Upon arriving at the hospital, he finds a clipboard with his name on it, even though he claims he has never been a patient there. He proceeds to the room indicated on the clipboard where the door shuts and he becomes trapped. Seeing nothing else to do, he takes a blue, red or green pill (depending on how the player progressed through the game) at the bedside and then goes to sleep. The scenes leading to the final one are different depending on the choices that the player has made throughout the game. However, the final scene always contains a shot of the man and the girl in the blue dress having a conversation and looking out upon the city.

In the Director's Cut, assuming the player has the maximum mental health score, and does a multitude of other things throughout the game, they will get a different ending, where the character walks down a hallway in the hospital while hiding from the girl in the blue dress, who appears to be infected and is crawling across the ground. It will still end with the man and the girl looking out to the city. A joke ending also exists, where the man dances at a party (which was likely a hallucination).

=== Endings ===
Blue Ending

In the 'blue' ending the player encounters the man who had gunshot wounds in the game's opening. The man in blue taunts and laughs at the protagonist, leading the man to shoot at him. After shooting, the man's appearance changes to resemble the man in blue, whose gunshot wound is fully healed. The game concludes with a clear view of the devastated city, followed by a conversation between him and 'her' sitting on a hill. This ending suggests the man's possible descent into further madness, or the indifference of the main character to his problems and sanity.

Red Ending

The 'red' ending is an alternate outcome to the previous ending and is triggered if the player's mental score is at the absolute lowest possible. After shooting, the man's appearance changes to resemble the man in blue, after the manifestation of the similar gunshot wound on the protagonist. The game concludes with a clear view of the devastated city, just like in the 'blue' ending, followed by a conversation between him and 'her' sitting on a hill. This ending suggests the man's further psychological madness, demise during a coma or possible suicide.

Green Ending

In the 'green' ending, it is suggested through cryptic and brief flashbacks of conversations that the woman in blue was a sister, spouse, or girlfriend to the man and that she had possibly died in some form of accident or illness (although it is implied that it could be the result of a car bomb, judging by the deprived environment in the city and several references to war within the game). It is at least hinted that in living through survivor's guilt, the man goes through a psychotic episode and is admitted into a psychiatric ward in which he experiences the game up until that point as an insane musing - combating both the violent nature of himself (the man in blue) and his imaginings which serve to pull him away from the truth.

White Ending

Available only in the Director's Cut, the 'white' ending is an extension of the green ending and is possible only on or after a second playthrough. By accomplishing various obscure goals throughout the game and attaining the highest possible mental score, the player can unlock a different door in the hospital, leading down to the basement. There, the nameless man must avoid legless versions of the girl in the blue dress, as they chase him through a hallway that becomes increasingly organic. Finally reaching the end, he ends up in a hospital room, with a glass of water to be taken. Upon drinking the water and going to sleep on the bed, the nameless man has a heartfelt conversation with a healthy version of the woman in blue, followed by scenes largely similar to those seen in the 'green' ending, implying that the man had finally overcome his survivor's guilt and can move on at last.

Yellow Ending

Available only in the Director's Cut, the 'yellow' ending is also only available on a repeat playthrough. By completing a series of specific tasks and also attaining the white ending on the previous playthrough, giving a particular item to the first NPC the player meets will unlock a "joke" ending where the nameless man decides to simply dance his troubles away at the NPCs party instead of completing the game's tasks again.

== Reception ==
Reception

Aggregate scores
Aggregator	Score
GameRankings	(PS3) 82.50% (Vita) 81.36% (PC) 80.62% (PS4) 80.00% (WIIU) 76.25%
Metacritic	(PS3) 84/100 (PC) 81/100 (Vita) 81/100 (WIIU) 76/100

Review scores
Publication	Score
Edge	7/10
Eurogamer	8/10
GameSpot	8.5/10
GameSpy	4.5/5
IGN	8.5/10
PC Gamer (US)	79/100

Lone Survivor received positive reviews from critics, with most reviewers praising the game for its storyline and gameplay, but some reviewers criticized the game for not delivering on the psychological horror aspect. It received a score of 80.62% on GameRankings, an 81/100 on Metacritic., and an 8.5/10 on IGN.
