= Nova-111 =

2015 video game

- Developer: Funktronic Labs
- Publishers: Curve Digital; No Gravity Games (Note: Nintendo Switch port)
- Platforms: macOS; Microsoft Windows; PlayStation 4; Xbox One; PlayStation 3; PlayStation Vita; Wii U; Nintendo Switch
- Release: macOS, Windows, PS4; August 25, 2015; Xbox One; August 28, 2015; PlayStation 3, PS Vita; September 1, 2015; Wii U September 24, 2015; Nintendo Switch; January 13, 2022
- Genre: Strategy
- Mode: Single-player

Nova-111 is a 2015 science fiction turn-based strategy / puzzle video game developed by Funktronic Labs and published by Curve Digital. It was released for macOS, Microsoft Windows, PlayStation 4, Xbox One, PlayStation 3, PlayStation Vita, and the Wii U in August and September 2015. A port for the Nintendo Switch was released in January 2022 and was published by No Gravity Games.

== Gameplay ==
Players shoot their way through planets in an orange spaceship. The mission is to search for lost scientists in the aftermath of the science experiments.

== Reception ==
Reception

Aggregate score
Aggregator	Score
Metacritic	(PC) 68/100 (PS4) 73/100 (VITA) 75/100 (WII U) 76/100 (NS) 67/100

Review scores
Publication	Score
Destructoid	7/10
Nintendo Life	9/10
Nintendo World Report	8/10
Pocket Gamer	3/5
Push Square	8/10
RPGamer	3/5

Nova-111 received "mixed or average" reviews for Windows, PlayStation 4, and Nintendo Switch and "generally favorable" reviews for PlayStation Vita and Wii U. It was given a score of 7 out of 10 on Destructoid, which praised it for forcing the player to think in new ways in a way that games in established genres could rarely do. Pocket Gamer gave the game 3 stars out of 5, writing, "All in all, Nova-111 is a game that doesn't quite live up to the promise of its concept, and it's mostly down to relatively small mistakes. There's something here, and you'll definitely have fun for a couple of hours, but it's nowhere near what could've been." Nintendo Life awarded it 9 stars out of 10, praising its meticulously designed levels while writing, "Nova-111 is a fantastic puzzle action adventure game with a world that's built with care from its beautiful colours, rich in-depth quirky gameplay to its witty humour." Nintendo World Report gave the title the score is 8/10, where it states that the video game is fun and entertaining. Push Square gave the title 8 out of 10 stars, concluding, "Though [Nova-111] does have some flaws, such as a lacklustre auto-save feature and a cumbersome amount of abilities, you'll be hard pressed to find a weirder and more brilliant tribute to the men and women who changed the world through science."
