= Droid Assault =

2008 video game

- Developer(s): Puppy Games
- Publisher(s): Puppy Games
- Platform(s): Windows, OS X, Linux
- Release: May 2, 2008
- Genre(s): Multidirectional shooter
- Mode(s): Single-player

Droid Assault is a scrolling multidirectional shooter developed by Puppy Games and released on May 2, 2008 for Windows, OS X, and Linux. The game received mixed reviews from critics, praising its art style and gameplay but calling its length short.

== Gameplay ==
Droid Assault is based on the 1985 game Paradroid. It takes place in what is implied to be a spaceship where the player controls a basic model of robot. The player must take control of other robots in order to progress, but only if they have enough "transfer points" to hack into them. The old model then turns into an AI follower of the player and automatically targets enemies. The player can then change between any of the droids in their "robot army" at no cost. Ultimately, the player must fight a boss robot.

== Reception ==
Droid Assault received mixed reviews from critics.

Silviu Stahie of Softpedia gave the game an 85/100, calling the concept "interesting" and the graphics beautiful, saying the only con was that sometimes the action on screen became too hectic.

Michael Krosta of 4Players gave the game a 66/100, concluding the game is "pleasantly" fast-paced and that the graphics are charming, but said that the levels became repetitive and the game itself didn't last long before its charm wore off.

Alec Meer of Rock, Paper, Shotgun called the game "more than enough pixel-robot goodness for the price" and a "defiantly old-school affair".

Totalbiscuit called the game "super fun" and "strongly recommended" the game in a review, though he criticized the control scheme as in need of improvement.
