= Runner Duck =

British video game developer

Runner Duck Games Limited
- Type: Private
- Industry: Video games
- Founded: December 2016; 9 years ago
- Founder: Dave Miller; Jon Wingrove
- Headquarters: UK
- Key people: Dave Miller (creative director); Jon Wingrove (technical director)
- Owner: None (2016-2019); Catalis Group (2019–2019); NorthEdge Capital (2019–2025); Nazara Technologies (2025-2025); None (2025-present)
- Members: 2

Runner Duck is a video game developer headquartered in the UK. It was founded by Dave Miller and Jon Wingrove in 2016.

== History ==
Runner Duck was founded in December 2016 as an independent games development studio by former AAA, casual and mobile game developers Dave Miller and Jon Wingrove. The founders had previously worked on popular games such as Race Driver: Grid, Colin McRae: DiRT 2, and the Buzz! series. The two founders previously worked together at mobile game development company, and started Runner Duck because they hated working there, and disliked the Free-to-play model.

Runner Duck released their first game, Bomber Crew in October 2017, published by Curve Games.

In 2018, Runner Duck won the MCV/Develop Award for "Best New Studio".

In March 2019, Curve Games parent company Catalis Group acquired Runner Duck with the aim of continuing the "crew" franchise with Curve Games as the publisher.

In June 2025, Curve Games, including its subsidiaries Runner Duck and Iron Oak, was acquired by Nazara Technologies.

In a Steam post on the Badlands Crew Discussion forum, a developer from Runner Duck confirmed they have become fully independent again.

== Games developed ==
Title	Year	Platform(s)
Bomber Crew	2017	Microsoft Windows, Mac OS X, Linux, Xbox One, PlayStation 4, Nintendo Switch
Space Crew	2020	Microsoft Windows, Mac OS X, Linux, Xbox One, PlayStation 4, Nintendo Switch
Badlands Crew	2025	Microsoft Windows
