= The Little Acre =

2016 video game

- Developer(s): Pewter Games Studios
- Publisher(s): Curve Digital
- Engine: Unity
- Platform(s): Linux; macOS; Windows; PlayStation 4; Xbox One; iOS; Nintendo Switch
- Release: Linux, macOS, Windows, PlayStation 4, Xbox One; 13 December 2016 iOS; 21 June 2017; Nintendo Switch; 25 April 2019
- Genre(s): Point and click adventure game
- Mode(s): Single-player

The Little Acre is an adventure game developed by Pewter Games Studios with Charles Cecil and published by Curve Digital. It was released for originally released for Windows, macOS, and Linux in 2016, with versions for iOS and Nintendo Switch following in 2017 and 2019, respectively. It was originally planned to be released November 22, 2016.

== Plot ==
Set in 1950's Ireland, The Little Acre tells the story of a small family. The player controls Aidan, a job-hunting engineer, and his daughter Lily. One morning Aidan goes missing and Lily decides to go and find him. During her search, she discovers an entrance-way to a mysterious world in the family's garden shed.
