= Pumped BMX =

2015 video game

Pumped BMX +
- Developer: Yeah Us!
- Publisher: Curve Digital
- Platforms: Microsoft Windows; PlayStation 4; PlayStation 3; PlayStation Vita; Wii U; Xbox One
- Release: Microsoft Windows, Wii U, Xbox One: WW: September 18, 2015; PlayStation 4, PlayStation 3, PlayStation Vita: WW: September 22, 2015
- Genres: Sport; Racing
- Mode: Single-player

Pumped BMX + is a 2015 arcade racing video game developed by Yeah Us! and published by Curve Digital. The game was free for PlayStation Plus subscribers in November 2016. The game was released on September 18, 2015 for Xbox One, PC, and Wii U, on September 22, 2015 for PlayStation 4, PlayStation 3, and PlayStation Vita.

== Gameplay ==
Pumped BMX + is a platformed style, side scrolling, BMX stunt game, where the player plays with a side on view and has to complete the course; the quicker the time, the more points awarded onto the score. Players can gain additional score points for performing tricks in the air, or grinding. These scores can be compared with friends and online with a leaderboard. Players have to ride their way through levels which continuously increase in difficulty while performing insane and impressive trick combinations. Players have to complete three challenge levels (easy, normal, hard) for every level, each containing four tasks to complete before moving onto the next difficulty. The game allows the players to select their own rider by customising what they look like and what bike to use, and perform the best stunts they can whilst riding through over 500 challenges to reach the top of the world leaderboards.

== Reception ==
Reception

Aggregate score
Aggregator	Score
Metacritic	(XONE) 56/100

Pumped BMX + has received "mixed or average" reviews according to review aggregator Metacritic.
