= 10 Second Ninja X =

2016 video game

- Developer: Four Circle Interactive
- Publisher: Curve Games (Note: Thalamus Digital published the Nintendo Switch version.)
- Designer: Dan Pearce
- Engine: GameMaker Studio
- Platforms: PlayStation 4; PlayStation Vita; Windows; Xbox One; Nintendo Switch
- Release: PS4, Vita, Windows, Xbox One; July 19, 2016; Switch; July 30, 2021
- Genre: Puzzle-platform
- Mode: Single-player

10 Second Ninja X is a 2016 puzzle-platform game developed by Four Circle Interactive and published by Curve Games. The game was released in July 2016 for PlayStation 4, PlayStation Vita, Microsoft Windows, and Xbox One, and in July 2021 for Nintendo Switch.

== Gameplay ==
10 Second Ninja X is a side-scrolling puzzle-platform game. The game follows a ninja who must destroy robots and complete levels within 10 seconds. The player has several attacks, including a projectile that has limited capacity. A level is finished when the player has destroyed all targets onscreen. Star ratings are given for completed levels, with higher stars given for completing the missions in faster times.

== Development and release ==
10 Second Ninja X is a remastered version of 10 Second Ninja. 10 Second Ninja X was released for the PlayStation 4, PlayStation Vita, Windows, and Xbox One on July 19, 2016, by Curve Games, and for the Nintendo Switch by Thalamus Digital on July 30, 2021.

== Reception ==
Reception

Aggregate scores
Aggregator	Score
Metacritic	PS4: 76/100; XONE: 82/100
OpenCritic	67% recommend

On Metacritic, 10 Second Ninja X received scores of 76/100 for the PC version and 82/100 for the Xbox One edition, and on OpenCritic, the game has a 67% approval rating.
