= Ultratron =

2013 video game

- Developer: Puppy Games
- Publishers: Puppy Games, Curve Studios Deep Silver
- Platforms: Windows; Mac OS; Linux; PlayStation 3; PlayStation 4; PlayStation Vita; Wii U; Xbox One
- Release: March 18, 2013
- Genre: Top-down shooter
- Mode: Single-player

Ultratron is a top-down shooter video game developed and published by Puppy Games and released on March 18, 2013 for Windows, Mac OS X, and Linux. It was also published by Curve Studios and released on May 8, 2015 for Xbox One, May 12, 2015 for PlayStation 3, PlayStation 4 and PlayStation Vita, and May 14, 2015 for Wii U.

The game received mixed reviews from critics, praising the art style and gameplay, but criticizing its short length and lack of complexity.

== Gameplay ==
Ultratron is heavily inspired by Robotron 2084, but rather than 8-directional movement, the game gives the player free pixel movement to anywhere on the screen. However, the screen still does not scroll vertically or horizontally, and remains static. The player controls a robot that moves using the left analog stick of the controller, and can aim and shoot its gun with the right stick. The player can also use special weapons known as smart bombs to destroy all enemies on screen. The ultimate goal is to destroy all enemies and complete the level, while collecting upgrades as well as pieces of fruit to increase the player's score.

The player can upgrade their robot between levels, including buying smart bombs, pet helpers, and increased firepower. Every fifth level is an assault level, where the enemies become significantly more aggressive, and every tenth level is a boss. As there are four robotic bosses in the game, there are forty levels in total.

== Plot ==
The game takes place in a post-apocalyptic future where humans have gone extinct due to killer robots. The player is the last remaining battle droid, humanoid robots created to defend the human race, and must avenge them by stopping the killer robot army in their stead.

== Reception ==
Ultratron received mixed reviews, with the game possessing an aggregate score of 73/100 on Metacritic for the Wii U version, and 74/100 for the Xbox One version.

Daan Koopman of Nintendo World Report gave the game an 8/10, saying that the game is "worth playing" but criticizing the amount of visual effects as overdone and saying that the assault stages were too difficult.

Joseph Walsh of Nintendo Life gave the game a score of 7/10, saying that the game is "incredibly addictive", with "new mechanics that help breathe life into one of gaming's oldest genres". He criticized a "lack of levels" and "some presentational hiccups".

Mathias Oertel of 4Players gave the game 75/100, praising the "distinctive art design", "co-op mode" and "well-balanced upgrade system", but saying that it lacks "substance".
