= Space Crew =

2020 sim video game

- Developer(s): Runner Duck
- Publisher(s): Curve Digital
- Engine: Unity
- Platform(s): Microsoft Windows, OS X, Xbox One, PlayStation 4, Linux, Nintendo Switch
- Release: Standard Edition: WW: Oct 15, 2020; Legendary Edition: WW: Oct 21, 2021
- Genre(s): Strategy, Survival game, Simulation video game, Management sim
- Mode(s): Single-player

Space Crew is a strategic, survival simulation video game developed by Runner Duck and published by Curve Digital. It was released on Microsoft Windows, OS X, Linux, PlayStation 4, Xbox One and Nintendo Switch on 15 October 2020. It is the sequel to the game Bomber Crew, released in 2017. An update, Space Crew: Legendary Edition, was released in October 2021, which featured a new campaign. Space Crew was developed by a team of four developers.

== Gameplay ==
The player gives commands to their crew to take them through a campaign of missions set in the Solar System and beyond. New upgrades and equipment become unlocked, and crew members can gain new skills as the game progresses. The Space Crew: Legendary Edition update adds new gameplay features, including missions where the player's crew leave the ship to explore outposts featuring enemies and puzzles.

== Reception ==
Reception

Review scores
Publication	Score
Nintendo Life	7/10
PCGamesN	7/10

The game received mixed or average reviews, according to review aggregator Metacritic. Rock Paper Shotgun praised the game's ability to make players feel like they have skillfully averted a major catastrophe while maintaining balanced gameplay, though they criticized an occasional lack of choice in some areas. Although saying that the game is fun when played in bite-sized chunks, PCGamesN compared it negatively to Into the Breach, FTL: Faster Than Light, and Slay the Spire, which the reviewer felt were more fun in longer gameplay sessions. Nintendo Life criticized the game's controls for the Switch and its difficulty, but they enjoyed the in-depth gameplay, art style, and character customization.

== Trivia ==
The "Away Team" mode featured in the Legendary Edition expansion was first developed by Jon Wingrove in secret, before revealing it to the rest of the team.
