= Tokyo Tattoo Girls =

2016 video game

- Developer: Sushi Typhoon Games
- Publishers: JP: Nikkatsu; WW: NIS America
- Platforms: PlayStation Vita; Microsoft Windows
- Release: PlayStation Vita: JP: September 30, 2016; NA: November 14, 2017; EU: November 17, 2017; Microsoft Windows: NA: November 14, 2017; EU: November 17, 2017
- Genre: Strategy
- Mode: Single-player

Tokyo Tattoo Girls, known in Japan as Irezumi no Kuni, (Note: Irezumi no Kuni (Japanese: 刺青の国; "Tattoo Nation")) is a strategy video game developed by Sushi Typhoon Games, Nikkatsu's video game label. It was published for PlayStation Vita as a digital-only title in Japan by Nikkatsu in 2016, and was released internationally for PlayStation Vita and Microsoft Windows by NIS America in 2017. Unlike the original Japanese release, NIS America's Vita version was released physically.

== Synopsis ==
The game is set in Tokyo, after a catastrophe has isolated the city and the inhabitants who survived from the rest of the world. In an effort to maintain peace, the city is divided into twenty-three wards, each controlled by a group called a Kumi; the twenty-three Kumi form the Union, which it is rumored must be defeated for escape from Tokyo to be possible. Following the catastrophe, some of the inhabitants of Tokyo learn that they have been granted powerful abilities through tattoos.

== Gameplay ==
Tokyo Tattoo Girls is a strategy game in which the player aims to conquer each of the twenty-three wards and escape Tokyo; they choose a female character to accompany them, and help her develop abilities by giving her tattoos.

== Development and release ==
The game was developed by Nikkatsu's video game label Sushi Typhoon Games. It was their first game developed, after the brand was established in January 2016. The tattoo designs were influenced by traditional Japanese tattoo art by Koji Tanaka.

Nikkatsu published it as a digital-only title for PlayStation Vita on September 30, 2016 in Japan. An English localization was announced by NIS America during a press event in February 2017, for PlayStation Vita and Microsoft Windows; it was released in North America on November 14, 2017, and in Europe on November 17. Their Windows release also features a Japanese language option, and their PlayStation Vita version is available in a limited edition that includes an artbook and the game's soundtrack.

== Reception ==
Reception

Review score
Publication	Score
Famitsu	25/40 (7, 6, 6, 6)

As Sushi Typhoon Games's purpose was stated to be "delivering entertainment to the world", Gueed of 4Gamer.net thought an English release should have been expected, and hoped for its success in the overseas market and the development of further Sushi Typhoon Games titles for international release. Steve Hannley of Hardcore Gamer compared the game to the Senran Kagura series, due to its similar focus on young women with large breasts.
