= Titan Attacks! =

2006 video game

- Developer: Puppy Games
- Publishers: Puppy Games; Curve Studios
- Platforms: Windows, Mac OS X, Linux, PS3, PS4, Vita, 3DS, Android
- Release: March 13, 2006
- Genre: Fixed shooter
- Mode: Single-player

Titan Attacks! is a fixed shooter video game developed and published by Puppy Games and released on March 13, 2006 for Windows, Mac OS X, and Linux. It was also published by Curve Studios and released on May 6, 2014 for PS3, PS4 and Vita, on February 26, 2015 for 3DS, and on September 17, 2016 for Android.

The game received mixed reviews from critics, commending its art style and addictiveness but citing its small amount of content and problems with the 3DS port of the game. It was followed by a sequel, Revenge of the Titans, in 2010.

== Gameplay ==
Titan Attacks! is heavily based on Space Invaders in overall format, but more fast-paced than the latter game. The player controls a tank and must shoot at enemies moving back and forth at the top of the screen, who sometimes shoot back with lasers and bombs.

The player also collects money, which they can use to buy tank upgrades to increase the power of their tank. This includes a more powerful gun and defensive energy that protects the player from attacks.

== Plot ==
The player is the last surviving tank commander on Earth, and must defend the planet from an onslaught of aliens from the moon Titan.

== Reception ==
The game received mixed reviews from critics, and holds an aggregate score of 74/100 for the PS4 version on Metacritic.

Colin Moriarty of IGN rated the game 74/100, calling the game "unapologetically old-school" and a "fun time-waster", though he criticized the fact that it didn't attempt to break any new ground.

Wesley Copeland of Pocket Gamer UK gave the game a score of 7/10, saying it still feels "fresh and inventive" despite its old-school design, and adds new twists to the Space Invaders formula.

The 3DS version of the game received lower review scores, with an aggregate score of 64/100 on Metacritic. Jonathan Town of Nintendo Life called the game's "vibrant" graphics "muted and dulled down" by the smaller screen of the 3DS, while also criticizing its lack of stereoscopic 3D and framerate drops during intense moments. Dan Koopman of Nintendo World Report gave the game 7/10 and called it a "loving Space Invaders tribute", but also criticized the lack of visual quality, and framerate lag.

== See also ==
- Revenge of the Titans
