= Velocity (video game) =

2012 video game

- Developers: FuturLab; Curve Studios (PC)
- Publishers: FuturLab; Curve Studios Deep Silver (PC)
- Platforms: PlayStation Portable; PlayStation Vita; PlayStation 3; Microsoft Windows
- Release: PlayStation Portable: NA: 15 May 2012; EU: 16 May 2012 Velocity Ultra PlayStation Vita; EU: 15 May 2013; NA: 2 July 2013 PlayStation 3; NA: 12 November 2013; EU: 13 November 2013 Microsoft Windows 12 December 2013
- Genre: Shoot 'em up
- Mode: Single-player

Velocity is a 2012 shoot 'em up video game developed by British studio FuturLab for the PlayStation 3, PlayStation Portable, and PlayStation Vita. It was released as a PlayStation mini. It was ported to Windows by Curve Studios. A sequel, Velocity 2X, was released in 2014.

== Gameplay ==
Velocity's gameplay involves navigating the Quarp Jet – a teleporting spacecraft – through space, whilst avoiding and defeating enemies using bombs that can be flung in cardinal directions. The main goal of the game is to rescue stranded ships. The game adds depth by introducing new abilities and obstacles. The stranded ships are protected by shields that must be disabled by switches in a specific order. The player's ship has the ability to fire bombs. The game allows the player to teleport their ship anywhere. It also allows the player create telepods which they can return to anytime. The telepods add a puzzle element to the game because the player has to return to activate the switches in the right order.

== Plot ==
Velocity is set in 2212. The star Vilio has collapsed into a black hole rendering the nearby space mining ships, colony cruisers, and special forces fighters without power. Only the Quarp Jet is capable of a rescue operation because it has the power to teleport. Unfortunately the mission is further complicated by the invasion of a neighboring race. Moreover, the ships can only be rescued after disabling their shields. The shields can only be disabled through circuit breakers. The circuit breakers are scattered, and must be deactivated in the correct order. In Velocity the player takes on the role of the Quarp Jet. They must find the station, disable their shields, and rescue the stranded ships. Concurrently they must also battle with the invading race, the Zetachron.

== Development ==
Graphics for the PlayStation Mini version (left) and the native PlayStation Vita version (right)

Velocity was developed by FuturLab, which is based in Brighton. The idea for Velocity came from a musical tune composed by one of the game's creators James Marsden. The tune is featured in the critical urgency levels of the game. The game started development in June 2010. In August 2011 the main features and mechanics of the game were finalized. August 2011 was also when FuturLab signed a deal with PlayStation Plus that was essential to the game's completion. Velocity was mainly worked on by its creators: James Marsden, Robin Jubber and Kirsty Rigden. Additionally the creators also worked with sixteen freelance contractors, whose work on the game ranged from a few days to several months.

== Velocity Ultra ==
Velocity Ultra is a high-definition remake of Velocity for the PlayStation Vita and was released on 15 May 2013. The remake includes numerous new features and upgrades and the graphics for Velocity Ultra have been completely remade to accommodate the high-definition resolution of the Vita. The art style has been reworked to be more consistent, and better match the upgraded graphics. Moreover, the remake includes Trophy support for the PlayStation Network. Furthermore, Velocity Ultra includes leaderboards; a global leaderboard, and a separate leaderboard for PlayStation Network friends. Additionally the game's user interface has been redesigned to support touch controls in addition to device buttons. Teleportation is possible simply by touching the screen, and bombs have been allocated to the right analog stick. The game is also available on PlayStation 3 and Steam.

== Reception ==
Reception

Aggregate score
Aggregator	Score
Metacritic	87/100

Review scores
Publication	Score
Edge	9/10
Eurogamer	8/10
GameSpot	7/10
IGN	9/10
Play	90%
VideoGamer.com	8/10

Velocity has been met with positive reviews. Eurogamer's Rich Stanton rated the game an 8/10 saying, "Velocity looks like a blast from the past and plays like anything but; it's some sort of triumph of substance over style. That sounds like a good thing, and it is, but a little more of the latter wouldn't have hurt." IGN adds "It's not the modest price that makes you love Velocity, though, it's the ideas – the casual, confident creativity and gradually unfolding scope of its levels". GameSpot gave Velocity a 7/10 noting that "initial parts of the game are repetitive".

== Sequel ==
The sequel, titled Velocity 2X, was developed by FuturLab, published by Sierra Entertainment and released in September, 2014 on PlayStation 4 and PlayStation Vita, later ported to Microsoft Windows and Xbox One.
