= When Ski Lifts Go Wrong =

2019 video game

- Developer: Hugecalf Studios
- Publisher: Curve Digital
- Platforms: Windows, macOS, Nintendo Switch
- Release: WW: 23 January 2019
- Genre: Construction and management simulation
- Mode: Single-player

When Ski Lifts Go Wrong is a 2019 construction and management simulation video game developed by British indie developer Hugecalf Studios and published by Curve Digital. When Ski Lifts Go Wrong was released in early access on 4 October 2017 and fully released on 23 January 2019 on Windows, macOS and Nintendo Switch.

== Gameplay ==
When Ski Lifts Go Wrong is a low-poly physics-based construction simulation game in which the player must construct chairlifts, gondolas, jumps and bridges to get non-playable character skiers through a snowy mountain setting.

The goal is to achieve success in attempts to build strong structures within a budget. Each stage begins with a landscape over a paper background, where the materials can be placed and a cable is attached to these structures. The game visualises the amount of stress on each attached structure using colours so that the player knows which aspects of their construction they should improve on.

Each level is completed when the player creates a working structure to carry a set number of controllable non-player character riders to the other side of the map. In over 100 levels, riders have to be carried across safely and the map has to remain intact. There are other factors in each level, such as a star rating which counts the number of stars the riders collect during the level, and a price limit which the player should stay under. A level editor is available, where players can create their own maps to play on.

== Development ==
When Ski Lifts Go Wrong was released in early access under the name Carried Away on 4 October 2017. A downloadable content pack, titled Carried Away: Winter Sports, was released on 9 February 2018, which features new modes and enables the player to compete in different sports. When Ski Lifts Go Wrong was fully released on 23 January 2019 for Windows, macOS and Nintendo Switch.

== Reception ==
When Ski Lifts Go Wrong has been described as a game that is "easy to pick up, but hard to master." The game has been compared to Happy Wheels and Bridge Constructor.
