= Exile Election =

2017 visual novel video game

- Developer: Regista
- Publisher: Nippon Ichi Software
- Platforms: PlayStation Vita, PlayStation 4
- Release: JP: April 27, 2017; KO: September 14, 2017; AS: September 28, 2017
- Genre: Visual novel
- Mode: Single-player

Exile Election (Note: Exile Election (追放選挙, Tsuihō Senkyo)) is a visual novel video game developed by Nippon Ichi Software for the PlayStation Vita and PlayStation 4 video game consoles. It was released in Japan on April 27, 2017.

== Gameplay ==
The game is described by its developers as a "death game adventure" title. The game plays similar to adventure visual novels such as Danganronpa and Zero Escape.

== Story ==
The game takes places in an abandoned amusement park. The game's characters are trapped within the park, with the outside world being in a post-apocalyptic wasteland infested with murderous monsters. Within the park, the game's twelve main characters are held captive by a mysterious mechanical doll named "Alice", who holds the "death games", which basically force the characters against each other for survival - the losers being exiled back out into the world. Alice refuses to stop the games until only two characters are alive and present. The game's protagonist is Kaname Ichijou, a young man who has the ability to see sound as colors, and sees spoken falsehoods in the color of red. He also harbors a grudge against most of the rest of the characters of the game for allowing the exile of his little sister.

== Development ==
The game was announced by Nippon Ichi Software in January 2017, through two teaser trailers. The game was approximately 90% complete at the time of the announcement. In the following month, Nippon Ichi announced a series of thirteen separate trailers detailing each of the main characters in the game as well. The game was released on April 27, 2017 on both the PlayStation Vita and PlayStation 4 in Japan; no release plans have been announced for any other regions.

The game's theme song is "Melody and Flower" by Yurika Endō.

== Reception ==
Reception

Review score
Publication	Score
Famitsu	31/40
