= Velocity 2X =

2014 video game

- Developer: FuturLab
- Publishers: FuturLab; Activision (Note: Released under the Sierra Entertainment brand name) (PC/Xbox One version); Curve Digital Deep Silver (Nintendo Switch version)
- Platforms: PlayStation 4, PlayStation Vita, Microsoft Windows, OS X, Linux, Xbox One, Nintendo Switch
- Release: PlayStation 4, PlayStation Vita: NA: 2 September 2014; EU: 3 September 2014; Linux, Mac OS X, Microsoft Windows, Xbox One: WW: 19 August 2015; Nintendo Switch: WW: 20 September 2018
- Genres: Shoot 'em up, puzzle
- Mode: Single-player

Velocity 2X is a shoot 'em up video game developed and published by British studio FuturLab for the PlayStation 4 and PlayStation Vita. The sequel to Velocity, it was later released by Activision under the Sierra Entertainment brand for the Xbox One and PCs and Curve Digital for the Nintendo Switch.

== Gameplay ==
Like the game's predecessor, Velocity 2X is a top-down shooter with the ability to teleport your ship. In the sequel, developer Futurlab added 2D platformer sections interlaced in most levels.

Players move through the game's levels by collecting survivors, finishing levels quickly, and collecting every crystal, all without dying.

== Plot ==
Following the events of the previous game, Lt. Kai Tana drifts unconscious in a distant corner of the galaxy, partially fused with the self-repairing systems of her ship. She awakens to find herself a prisoner of the Vokh Empire, who plan to use the teleportation capabilities of her ship - and of her new cyborg body - to expand across the galaxy. A captive alien scientist helps her escape and recover her ship, and the two set out on a mission to return Tana to her home planet while stopping the Vokh Empire in its tracks.

== Reception ==
Reception

Aggregate score
Aggregator	Score
Metacritic	(PSV) 90/100 (PS4) 86/100 (XONE) 84/100

Review scores
Publication	Score
Eurogamer	8/10
GameSpot	9/10
IGN	9/10
Polygon	9/10
VideoGamer.com	8/10

Velocity 2X has been met with critical acclaim. Review aggregator site Metacritic assigned a score of 90 out of 100 for the PlayStation Vita version and 86 out of 100 for the PlayStation 4 version. Eurogamer's Simon Parkin rated the game an 8/10 saying, "Despite the game's dipped-nose poise, its obsession with speed and clocks, it rewards those who take their time, who perfect their technique on each stage, and who savour an arcade game that's been lovingly embellished and expanded to its full and likely final potential." IGN's Vince Ingenito rated the game 9 out of 10 with the verdict being: "Velocity 2X successfully builds upon the speed of the original with its awesome new side-scrolling sections."
