= Curve Games =

British video game publisher

Curve Games Limited
- Formerly: Curve Studios; Curve Digital
- Type: Private
- Industry: Video games
- Predecessor: Blue52
- Founded: 2005; 21 years ago
- Founder: Jason Perkins
- Headquarters: London, England
- Area served: Worldwide
- Key people: Bradley Crooks (COO); Stuart Dinsey (CEO)
- Parent: Catalis Group (2016–2025); Nazara Technologies (2025–present)
- Subsidiaries: IronOak Games
- Website: curvegames.com

Curve Games Limited (formerly Curve Digital Limited and Curve Studios Limited) is a British video game publisher and former video game developer based in London, founded in 2005 by Jason Perkins. It focuses on the publishing of indie games.

== History ==
Curve Studios was the successor to Blue52, who released the games Stolen and Peter Pan: The Legend of Never Land before shutting down, with the core team migrating to what would become Curve Studios after the development of the former. They would then form close relationships with Sony Computer Entertainment and Nintendo in their early years, developing instalments in the Buzz! series for the former and creating Fluidity for the latter.

In 2013, Curve Studios announced that they would begin publishing games, marking their transition to a video game publisher of indie games.

In January 2016, Curve Digital was acquired by Catalis Group. Catalis was then sold to NorthEdge Capital in October 2019. In March 2019, Curve Digital purchased Brighton-based Runner Duck, who had previously developed Space Crew for Curve Digital. In November 2020, Curve Digital acquired Vancouver-based IronOak Games, who had previously developed For the King with Curve Digital.

The company rebranded itself to Curve Games in October 2021 as part of their commitment to better support developers.

In May 2025, Curve Games and its studios were acquired by Indian company Nazara Technologies from Catalis Group.

== Games developed ==
Year	Title	Platform(s)
2008	Buzz!: Master Quiz	PlayStation Portable
2008	Buzz!: Brain Bender	PlayStation Portable
2009	Buzz!: Brain of the World	PlayStation Portable
2009	Buzz!: Quiz World	PlayStation Portable
2010	Fluidity	Wii
2011	Explodemon	PlayStation 3, Windows
2011	Stealth Bastard	Windows, OS X, Linux, PlayStation 4, PlayStation 3, PlayStation Vita, Android, iOS
2012	Fluidity: Spin Cycle	Nintendo 3DS
2014	Stealth Inc 2: A Game of Clones	Wii U, PlayStation 3, PlayStation 4, PlayStation Vita, Windows, Xbox One

== Games published ==
Year	Title	Platform(s)	Developer
2013	Lone Survivor	PlayStation 3, PlayStation Vita	Superflat Games
2013	Proteus	PlayStation 3, PlayStation Vita	Ed Key and David Kanaga
2013	Velocity Ultra	PlayStation 3, Windows	FuturLab
2013	Thomas Was Alone	PlayStation 3, PlayStation Vita, PlayStation 4, Xbox One, Wii U	Mike Bithell
2013	The Swapper	PlayStation 3, PlayStation Vita, PlayStation 4, Wii U	Facepalm Games
2014	Titan Attacks	PlayStation 3, PlayStation Vita, PlayStation 4, Nintendo 3DS	Puppy Games
2014	Mousecraft	PlayStation 3, PlayStation Vita, PlayStation 4	Crunching Koalas
2014	Lone Survivor: Director's Cut	PlayStation 4, Wii U	Superflat Games
2015	OlliOlli	Xbox One, Wii U, Nintendo 3DS	Roll7
2015	Porcunipine	Windows	Big Green Pillow
2015	The Swindle	PlayStation 3, PlayStation Vita, PlayStation 4, Xbox One, Wii U	Size Five Games
2015	Nova-111	PlayStation 3, PlayStation Vita, PlayStation 4, Xbox One, Wii U	Funktronic Labs
2015	Murder	Windows, iOS, Android	Peter Moorhead
2015	Ultratron	PlayStation 3, PlayStation Vita, PlayStation 4, Xbox One, Wii U, Windows	Puppy Games
2015	Action Henk	PlayStation 3, PlayStation Vita, PlayStation 4, Xbox One, Wii U	Ragesquid
2015	Pumped BMX +	PlayStation 3, PlayStation Vita, PlayStation 4, Xbox One, Wii U, Windows	Yeah Us!
2016	The Flame in the Flood	PlayStation 4, Xbox One, Nintendo Switch, Windows	The Molasses Flood
2016	Human: Fall Flat	Windows, macOS, Linux, PlayStation 4, Xbox One, Nintendo Switch, Google Stadia, Xbox Series X/S, PlayStation 5	No Brakes Games
2016	10 Second Ninja X	PlayStation Vita, PlayStation 4, Xbox One, Windows	Four Circle Interactive
2016	Hue	PlayStation 4, Xbox One, Windows, PlayStation Vita	Fiddlesticks
2016	Dear Esther: Landmark Edition	PlayStation 4, Xbox One	The Chinese Room
2016	Manual Samuel	PlayStation 4, Xbox One, Windows, Nintendo Switch	Perfectly Paranormal
2016	The Little Acre	PlayStation 4, Xbox One, Windows	Pewter Games Studios
2016	Stikbold! A Dodgeball Adventure	PlayStation 4, Xbox One, Windows	Game Swing
2017	Bomber Crew	Windows, PlayStation 4, Xbox One, Nintendo Switch	Runner Duck
2017	Jump Stars	PlayStation 4, Xbox One, Windows	Jamit Games
2017	Serial Cleaner	PlayStation 4, Xbox One, Nintendo Switch, Windows	iFun4all
2018	Beholder: Complete Edition	PlayStation 4, Xbox One, Nintendo Switch	Warm Lamp Games
2018	For the King	Windows, PlayStation 4, Xbox One, Nintendo Switch	IronOak Games
2018	A Knight's Quest	PlayStation 4, Xbox One, Nintendo Switch, Windows	Sky9 Games
2018	Smoke and Sacrifice	PlayStation 4, Xbox One, Nintendo Switch, Windows	Solar Sail Games
2018	Velocity 2X	Nintendo Switch	FuturLab
2019	Narcos: Rise of the Cartels	PlayStation 4, Xbox One, Nintendo Switch, Windows	Kuju Entertainment
2019	When Ski Lifts Go Wrong	Windows, Nintendo Switch	Hugecalf Studios
2019	Autonauts	Windows, Nintendo Switch, Xbox Series X/S, PlayStation 4, PlayStation 5	Denki
2019	American Fugitive	PlayStation 4, Xbox One, Nintendo Switch, Windows	Fallen Tree Games
2020	Space Crew	Windows, Nintendo Switch, PlayStation 4, Xbox One	Runner Duck
2020	Embr	Windows, Google Stadia	Muse Games
2020	Hotshot Racing	Windows, Nintendo Switch, PlayStation 4, Xbox One	Lucky Mountain Games, Sumo Digital
2020	Wobbly Life	Windows, PlayStation 4, Xbox One, Nintendo Switch Nintendo Switch 2	RubberBandGames
2020	Drake Hollow	Xbox One, Windows	The Molasses Flood
2021	The Ascent	Windows, Xbox One, Xbox Series X/S, PlayStation 4, PlayStation 5	Neon Giant
2021	Lawn Mowing Simulator	Windows, Xbox Series X/S, PlayStation 5	Skyhook Games
2021	Just Die Already	Windows, Nintendo Switch, PlayStation 4, Xbox One	DoubleMoose
2021	I Am Fish	Windows, Xbox One, Xbox Series X/S	Bossa Studios
2021	Table Manners	Windows	Echo Chamber Games
2022	Chenso Club	Windows, Nintendo Switch, PlayStation 4, PlayStation 5, Xbox One, Xbox Series X/S	Pixadome
2022	Golf Gang	Windows	Lazy Monday Games
2022	Autonauts VS Piratebots	Windows	Denki
2022	Patch Quest	Windows	Lychee Game Labs
2022	From Space	Windows, Nintendo Switch, PlayStation 4, PlayStation 5, Xbox One	Triangle Studios
2022	Block'em	Windows	Cat Shawl Games
2023	Blooming Business: Casino	Windows	Homo Ludens
2023	For the King II	Windows, PlayStation 5, Xbox One, Xbox Series X/S	IronOak Games
2024	Lawn Mowing Simulator VR	Meta Quest 3, Meta Quest Pro, Quest 2	Skyhook Games
2024	Dungeons of Hinterberg	Windows, Xbox Series X/S, PlayStation 4, PlayStation 5	Microbird Games
2024	KitHack Model Club	Windows	Floating Origin Interactive
2024	Skye Tales	Windows, Nintendo Switch, PlayStation 4	Puny Astronaut
2024	Manic Mechanics	Windows, Nintendo Switch, PlayStation 4, Xbox One	4J Studios
2024	Human Fall Flat VR	Windows, Meta Quest 2, Meta Quest 3, PlayStation 5	No Brakes Games
2025	Super Loco World	Windows	Andriy Bychkovskyi
2025	Badlands Crew	Windows	Runner Duck
2026	Wax Heads	Windows, Xbox Series X/S	Patattie Games
2026	Sovereign Tower	Windows	Wild Wits Games
2026	Cloudscrapers	Windows	Nementic Games
2026	Dragon Shelter	Windows	Wild Forest Studio
2026	Dumpster Gang	Windows, Nintendo Switch 2, PlayStation 5, Xbox Series X/S	Coyote House Games
2027	Lazare’s Sacrifice	Windows	Dream Reality Interactive
2027	Mechborn	Windows, Nintendo Switch, Nintendo Switch 2, PlayStation 5, Xbox Series X/S	Turtle Juice
TBA	Wyldheart	Windows	Wayfinder Studios
