= Four Door Lemon =

British video game company

Four Door Lemon Ltd
- Company type: Limited
- Industry: Video games
- Founded: April 2005
- Defunct: September 2018
- Fate: Insolvency
- Headquarters: Bradford, West Yorkshire, United Kingdom
- Key people: Simon Barratt; Les Ellis
- Number of employees: 15-20
- Website: fourdoorlemon.com (archived)

Four Door Lemon Ltd was a video game company based in Bradford, West Yorkshire and was one of the UK's longest-lived independent video games and middleware developers. Commonly known as "FDL", the company’s name derived from a children’s joke.

== History ==
The company was founded in 2005 by programmers Simon Barratt and Tim Wharton. After developing and launching the Lemon Engine as a middleware program, the team expanded and began development on games for various publishers alongside continued development on the Lemon Engine.

The company's workforce grew in size over time, with its operations encompassing the creation of games for multiple publishers in addition to the development and release of proprietary titles. Ultimately, the company was disbanded in September 2018.

== Company philosophy ==
After years of focusing on middleware and game developments, Four Door Lemon started to develop games to be self-published on various platforms, alongside completing work-for-hire titles for other publishers.

== Technology ==
Four Door Lemon utilized its own technology for developments. The multi-platform Lemon Engine has been used in all FDL-developed titles, with a version now being used for the PS4 and Xbox One developments.

== Games ==
- 101 Ways To Die (PC) published by 4 Door Lemon Vision 1
- Foul Play (PS4/PS Vita) published by Mastertronic/Mediatonic
- Joe Danger Infinity (PS Vita) published by Hello Games
- Joe Danger Touch (Android) published by Hello Games
- Table Mini Golf (PS Vita) published by SCEE
- Table Football (PS Vita) published by SCEE
- Table Ice Hockey (PS Vita) published by SCEE
- Oddworld: Munch’s Oddysee HD (PS3/PS Vita) published by Oddworld Inhabitants
- New Star Soccer 1.5 (iOS/Android) published by NewStarGames
- Football Director (NDS) published by Sports Director
- The Lighthouse HD (iOS) published by Kavcom Ltd
- You are the Ref (iOS/Android/PlayStation Mobile) self-published
- You are the Umpire (iOS/Android/PlayStation Mobile) self-published
- Cricket Captain 2010 (iOS) published by Myinteractive
- Premier Manager (PS2/PC) licensed technology published by Focus Multimedia
- Puzzler Collection (NDS/PS2/PSP/Wii/PC) published by Ubisoft
- Little Britain: The Video Game (PS2) published by Mastertronic
- Tic Toc Body Pop (iOS) self-published
- Quizquizquiz (iOS/Android/PlayStation Mobile/Kindle) self-published
- Aurifi (iOS) published by Punk Pie Ltd
- Busy Bees (PC touch screen) developed for the Eureka National Children’s Museum

== Industry organizations ==
Four Door Lemon was a member of numerous video games related bodies, including UKIE (board member), Game Republic, TIGA, Made in creative UK and Ga-Ma-Yo.
