= Three Fourths Home =

2015 video game

- Developer: Bracket Games
- Publisher: Bracket Games
- Platforms: Microsoft Windows; Linux; OS X; PlayStation 4; PlayStation Vita; Xbox One; Nintendo Switch
- Release: 20 March 2015
- Genre: Visual novel
- Mode: Single-player

Three Fourths Home is a game developed by Bracket Games, released on 20 March 2015.

== Plot ==
The game follows the struggles of one family. The protagonist, named Kelly, is driving through rural Nebraska when her mother calls, sparking a conversation that will change the upcoming events.

== Gameplay ==
The game is a visual novel. The player can make conversation choices that will change the relationships between the family members.

== Development ==
The game was a finalist for the Best Narrative IGF Award. A special extended edition of the game will be released with a section taking place in Minnesota. The game was released in 2015.

It was released on Steam on 20 March 2015.

== Reception ==
Three Fourths Home received mostly positive reviews. It has a score of 77% for the PC version on Metacritic. The Extended Edition was also released for PS4, PS Vita, and Xbox One to varied scores. While the PS Vita version received a score of 84%, the Xbox One version received a score of 64% based on critics that reviewed those versions. The PS4 version currently does not have enough reviews to offer a Metacritic score.

Gamespresso awarded it a score of five out of five, saying that it "challenges what a game is". Technology Tell said that the game was "effective in every way". GameSpot awarded it a score of 8.0 out of 10, saying "More than anything, though, Three Fourths Home reminded me of one of those nights where you look down to see that you're going ten… twenty… thirty miles over the speed limit."
