= Puppy Games =

UK independent games studio

- Company type: Private
- Industry: Video games
- Founded: 2002
- Founder: Caspian Prince; Chaz Willets
- Headquarters: Notting Hill, U.K.
- Products: Titan Attacks! Revenge of the Titans; Ultratron; Droid Assault
- Website: PuppyGames.net

Puppy Games is an independent games studio based in the UK. They describe their game style as "neo-retro arcade games".

Puppy Games is a corporation that was founded in 2002 by Caspian Prince and Chaz Willets as a part-time project, before becoming full-time in 2010 with the release of Revenge of the Titans. Justin "Allicorn" Burt joined the company in 2011.

Several of the games created by the studio are remakes of classic arcade games with modern graphics, new settings, and additional gameplay elements such as upgrades. However, their highest rated game, Revenge of the Titans, is an original concept.

Despite participating in the Humble Bundle, founder Caspian Prince has been vocal on the devaluation of indie games, saying that game bundles make individual consumers "worthless" as game studios must focus more on selling as many games as possible than providing support after the fact. He also predicted a "mass extinction event" of indie game developers due to an over-saturated market.

The studio had initially planned to develop Battledroid as the next game after Ultratron, but due to monetary troubles, they started developing Basingstoke, which was initially planned to be a small game, but also increased in scope. Puppy Games has since started a Patreon to help fund their games, but it was not a large success, forcing Caspian Prince to fund the studio from programming contract work for a marine seismic expedition, and use the money to hire a programmer. Basingstoke and Battledroid are still in development.

== Titles ==
Year	Title	System	Miscellaneous
2006	Titan Attacks!	Windows, Mac OS X, Linux, PS3, PS4, Vita, 3DS, Android	Inspired by Space Invaders.
2008	Droid Assault	Windows, Mac OS X, Linux	Inspired by Paradroid.
2010	Revenge of the Titans	Windows, Mac OS X, Linux	Tower defense/RTS game. Sequel to Titan Attacks!.
2013	Ultratron	Windows, Mac OS X, Linux, PS3, PS4, Vita, Wii U, Xbox One	Inspired by Robotron 2084.
2018	Basingstoke	Windows, Mac OS X, Linux, PS4, Xbox One	Survival horror/roguelike game.
TBA	Battledroid	Windows, Mac OS X, Linux	Free-to-play title, releasing exclusively on Steam
