= List of PlayStation Vita games (I–L) =

== Games list (I–L) ==
There are currently 1732 games across the lists of PlayStation Vita games.

For a chronological list, click the sort button in any of the available region's columns. Games dated December 17, 2011 (JP), February 15, 2012 (NA), and February 22, 2012 (EU) are launch titles of each region respectively.

Title	Genre(s)	Developer(s)	Publisher(s)	Release date			PS TV compat.	Ref.
Title	Genre(s)	Developer(s)	Publisher(s)	North America	Europe	Japan	PS TV compat.	Ref.
I Am The Hero	Beat 'em up	Ratalaika Games	Ratalaika Games, EastAsiaSoft	Nov 27, 2018	Nov 27, 2018	Mar 8, 2019	No	
I and Me	Platform	Wish Fang	Ratalaika Games	Mar 5, 2019	Mar 6, 2019	Unreleased	No	
I x SHE x Tell	Visual novel	Entergram	Entergram	Unreleased	Unreleased	Jan 9, 2020	No	
IA/VT Colorful	Rhythm	Marvelous	Marvelous	Unreleased	Unreleased	Jul 30, 2015	Yes	
Ice Cream Surfer	Shooter	Dolores Entertainment	Hidden Trap	Jul 17, 2018	Jul 18, 2018	Unreleased	No	
Iconoclasts	Platform	Konjak	JP: Dangen Entertainment; WW: Konjak	Jan 23, 2018	Jan 23, 2018	Jan 23, 2018	Yes	
Idol Death Game TV	Action-adventure	Witchcraft	D3 Publisher	Unreleased	Unreleased	Oct 20, 2016	Yes	
Idolish7: Twelve Fantasia	Rhythm	Bandai Namco Entertainment	Bandai Namco Entertainment	Unreleased	Unreleased	Feb 15, 2018	Yes	
The Idolmaster: Must Songs Blue Board	Rhythm	Bandai Namco Entertainment	Bandai Namco Entertainment	Unreleased	Unreleased	Dec 10, 2015	No	
The Idolmaster: Must Songs Red Board	Rhythm	Bandai Namco Entertainment	Bandai Namco Entertainment	Unreleased	Unreleased	Dec 10, 2015	No	
I Doll U	Otome game	Avex Pictures, Otomate	Idea Factory	Unreleased	Unreleased	Jul 16, 2015	Yes	
ID Rebirth Session	Visual novel	Rootnuko	Entergram	Unreleased	Unreleased	Nov 24, 2016	Yes	
Ikemen Bakumatsu: Unmei no Koi no Miyako to Koi no Ran	Otome game	Cybird	Lionsfilm	Unreleased	Unreleased	Dec 26, 2016	No	
Ikemen Sengoku: Toki o Kakeru Koi Arata Naru Deai	Otome game	Cybird	Idea Factory	Unreleased	Unreleased	Mar 22, 2018	Yes	
Illusion of L'Phalcia	Role-playing	Kemco	Kemco	Aug 6, 2019	Aug 21, 2019	Jul 3, 2019	No	
Ikenie to Yuki no Setsuna	Role-playing	Tokyo RPG Factory	Square Enix	Unreleased	Unreleased	Feb 18, 2016	Yes	
Ima Sugu Oniichan ni Imōto da tte Iitai!	Visual novel	Fairys	Piacci	Unreleased	Unreleased	Apr 24, 2014	Yes	
Imaginstruments	Application	Catalyst	Sony Computer Entertainment	Jan 9, 2013	Jan 9, 2013	Unreleased	No	
Indigo 7: Quest for Love	Puzzle	Dolores Entertainment	EastAsiaSoft	Aug 30, 2021	Aug 30, 2021	Aug 30, 2021	No	
Indoor Sports World	Sports	Icon Games Entertainment	Icon Games Entertainment	Dec 17, 2013	Dec 4, 2013	Unreleased	No	
Infinità Strada	Card battle	Office 5656	Office 5656	Unreleased	Unreleased	Apr 22, 2014	No	
Infinite Stratos 2: Ignition Hearts	Visual novel	5pb.	5pb.	Unreleased	Unreleased	Feb 27, 2014	Yes	
Infinite Stratos 2: Love and Purge	Visual novel	5pb.	5pb.	Unreleased	Unreleased	Sep 3, 2015	Yes	
Injustice: Gods Among Us Ultimate Edition	Fighting	NetherRealm Studios; Armature Studio	Warner Bros. Interactive Entertainment	Nov 12, 2013	Nov 29, 2013	Dec 19, 2013	No	
InkSplosion	Shooter	Petite Games	Ratalaika Games	May 8, 2018	May 9, 2018	Unreleased	No	
International Snooker	Sports	Big Head Games	Big Head Games	Unreleased	Mar 13, 2013	Unreleased	Yes	
Invizimals: Hidden Challenges	Strategy	Novarama	Sony Computer Entertainment	Unreleased	Jan 29, 2014	Unreleased	No	
Invizimals: The Alliance	Action	Novarama	Sony Computer Entertainment	Sep 30, 2014	Oct 30, 2013	Unreleased	No	
Invizimals: The Resistance	Action	Novarama	Sony Computer Entertainment	May 26, 2015	Oct 31, 2014	Unreleased	No	
Invokers Tournament	Multiplayer online battle arena	Stormbasic Games	Stormbasic Games	Sep 15, 2015	Dec 3, 2014	Unreleased	No	
iO	Platform	Gamious	Gamious	Feb 14, 2017	Unreleased	Unreleased	No	
Iron Sea Defenders	Tower defense	Creobit	8 Floor Games	Nov 22, 2016	Nov 23, 2016	Unreleased	No	
Iron Snout	Beat 'em up	SnoutUp	Ratalaika Games	Apr 16, 2019	Unreleased	Unreleased	No	
Irotoridori no Sekai: World's End Re:Birth	Visual novel	Favorite	Dramatic Create	Unreleased	Unreleased	Mar 29, 2015	No	
Island	Visual novel	Front Wing	Prototype	Unreleased	Unreleased	Feb 23, 2017	Yes	
Itadaki Street: Dragon Quest and Final Fantasy 30th Anniversary	Board game	Square Enix	Square Enix	Unreleased	Unreleased	Oct 19, 2017	No	
It's Spring Again	Educational	Baba Yaga Games; Sometimes You	Sometimes You	Jul 28, 2017	Sep 8, 2017	Unreleased	No	
Iwaihime: Matsuri	Visual novel	DMM.com	Nippon Ichi Software	Unreleased	Unreleased	Sep 7, 2017	Yes	
J-Stars Victory VS	Fighting	Spike Chunsoft	Bandai Namco Games	Mar 19, 2014	Mar 19, 2014	Mar 19, 2014	Yes	
J-Stars Victory VS Plus (Note: Update for J-Stars Victory VS.)	Fighting	Spike Chunsoft	Bandai Namco Games	Jun 26, 2015	Jun 26, 2015	Unreleased	Yes	
Jack N' Jill DX	Platform	Rohan Narang	Ratalaika Games	Sep 25, 2018	Unreleased	Unreleased	No	
Jacob Jones and the Bigfoot Mystery	Adventure, puzzle	Lucid Games	Lucid Games	May 14, 2013	May 15, 2013	Unreleased	No	
Jak and Daxter: The Precursor Legacy HD	Action-platform	Naughty Dog; Mass Media Inc.	Sony Computer Entertainment	Jun 18, 2013	Jun 19, 2013	Unreleased	No	
Jak II HD	Action-platform	Naughty Dog; Mass Media Inc.	Sony Computer Entertainment	Jun 18, 2013	Jun 19, 2013	Unreleased	No	
Jak 3 HD	Action-platform	Naughty Dog; Mass Media Inc.	Sony Computer Entertainment	Jun 18, 2013	Jun 19, 2013	Unreleased	No	
Jazz: Trump's Journey	Platform	Bulkypix	Egg Ball	Unreleased	Jul 9, 2014	Unreleased	Yes	
Jet Car Stunts	Racing	Grip Games	bitComposer Entertainment	Oct 7, 2014	Oct 8, 2014	Unreleased	Yes	
Jet Set Knights	Action	Ratalaika Games, FobTi Interactive	EastAsiasoft	Jun 21, 2023	Jun 21, 2023	Jun 21, 2023	Yes	
Jet Set Radio	Action	Smilebit, BlitWorks	Sega	Oct 16, 2012	Nov 21, 2012	Feb 20, 2013	Yes	
Jetpack Joyride	Endless runner	Halfbrick Studios, Big Ant Studios	Big Ant Studios	Dec 31, 2012	Dec 21, 2012	Unreleased	Yes	
Jetpack Joyride Deluxe (Note: Update for Jetpack Joyride.)	Endless runner	Halfbrick Studios, Big Ant Studios	Big Ant Studios	Nov 25, 2014	Dec 3, 2014	Unreleased	Yes	
Jikkyō Powerful Pro Yakyū 2012	Sports	Baseball Content Studio	Konami	Unreleased	Unreleased	Jul 19, 2012	No	
Jikkyō Powerful Pro Yakyū 2012 Kettei-ban (Note: Update for Jikkyō Powerful Pro Yakyū 2012.)	Sports	Baseball Content Studio	Konami	Unreleased	Unreleased	Dec 13, 2012	No	
Jikkyō Powerful Pro Yakyū 2013	Sports	Baseball Content Studio	Konami	Unreleased	Unreleased	Oct 24, 2013	Yes	
Jikkyō Powerful Pro Yakyū 2014	Sports	Baseball Content Production	Konami	Unreleased	Unreleased	Oct 23, 2014	Yes	
Jikkyō Powerful Pro Yakyū 2016	Sports	Konami	Konami	Unreleased	Unreleased	Apr 28, 2016	Yes	
Jikkyō Powerful Pro Yakyū 2018	Sports	Konami	Konami	Unreleased	Unreleased	Apr 26, 2018	Yes	
Jikkyō Powerful Pro Yakyū Championship 2017	Sports	Konami	Konami	Unreleased	Unreleased	May 25, 2017	Yes	
Jikkyō Powerful Pro Yakyū Championship 2018	Sports	Konami	Konami	Unreleased	Unreleased	Jul 25, 2018	Yes	
Jikkyō Powerful Pro Yakyū Success Special	Sports	Konami	Konami	Unreleased	Unreleased	Apr 28, 2016	Yes	
Jinrō Game	Visual novel	Office 5656	AMG Games	Unreleased	Unreleased	Mar 18, 2015	No	
Joe Danger	Racing, platform	Hello Games	Hello Games	Sep 2, 2014	Sep 3, 2014	Unreleased	Yes	
Joe Danger 2: The Movie	Racing, platform	Hello Games	Hello Games	Jan 13, 2015	Jan 14, 2015	Unreleased	Yes	
Jonah Lomu Rugby Challenge	Sports	Sidhe	Tru Blu Entertainment	Unreleased	Jun 27, 2012	Unreleased	No	
JOYSOUND.TV Plus	Rhythm	XING	XING	Unreleased	Unreleased	Nov 14, 2013	No	
Judas Code	Card battle, third-person shooter	tri-Ace	tri-Ace	Unreleased	Unreleased	Aug 21, 2014	Yes	
Jungle Rumble	Rhythm	Disco Pixel	Disco Pixel	Feb 10, 2015	Unreleased	Unreleased	No	
Just a Phrase by POWGI	Puzzle	Lightwood Games	Lightwood Games	Feb 4, 2020	Unreleased	Unreleased	No	
Just Ignore Them	Adventure	Stranga	Ratalaika Games	Oct 15, 2019	Unreleased	Unreleased	No	
Justy×Nasty: Maō Hajimemashita	Visual novel	Whirlpool	GN Software	Unreleased	Unreleased	Mar 26, 2015	Yes	
Jūzaengi: Engetsu Sangokuden 1-2	Otome game	Red Entertainment	Idea Factory	Unreleased	Unreleased	Aug 27, 2015	Yes	
Kadenz fermata Akkord: fortissimo	Visual novel	La'cryma, 5pb.	5pb.	Unreleased	Unreleased	Dec 11, 2014	No	
Kaeru Batake de Tsukamaete	Otome game; Mini-games	Takuyo	Takuyo	Unreleased	Unreleased	Dec 18, 2014	Yes	
Kaeru Batake de Tsukamaete: Natsu Chigira Sansen!	Otome game	Takuyo	Takuyo	Unreleased	Unreleased	May 21, 2015	Yes	
Kaihou Shoujo SIN	Visual novel	5pb.	5pb.	Unreleased	Unreleased	Jul 31, 2014	Yes	
Kai-Ri-Sei Million Arthur	Card battle	Square Enix	Square Enix	Unreleased	Unreleased	Sep 1, 2016	Yes	
Kajiri Kamui Kagura: Akebono no Hikari	Visual novel	Light	Light	Unreleased	Unreleased	Apr 25, 2013	Yes	
Kaku-San-Sei Million Arthur	Card battle	Square Enix	Square Enix	Unreleased	Unreleased	Apr 11, 2013	Yes	
Kaleido-Eve	Visual novel	Éstciel, HuneX	HuneX	Unreleased	Unreleased	Jan 22, 2015	Yes	
Kamen Rider: Battride War Genesis	Action role-playing	Eighting	Bandai Namco Entertainment	Unreleased	Unreleased	Feb 25, 2016	Yes	
Kamidanomi Shisugite Ore no Mirai ga Yabai	Visual novel	Hulotte	Entergram	Unreleased	Unreleased	Nov 22, 2017	Yes	
Kamigami no Asobi InFinite	Visual novel; Quiz	Nippon Ichi Software	Broccoli	Unreleased	Unreleased	Apr 21, 2016	Yes	
Kamisama to Koigokoro	Otome game; Mini-games	Takuyo	Takuyo	Unreleased	Unreleased	Sep 25, 2014	Yes	
Kamaitachi no Yoru: Rinne Saisei	Visual novel	Spike Chunsoft, Regista	5pb.	Unreleased	Unreleased	Feb 16, 2017	Yes	
KanColle Kai	Strategy	Kadokawa Games	Kadokawa Games	Unreleased	Unreleased	Feb 18, 2016	No	
Kannagi no Mori Satsukiame Tsuzuri	Visual novel	Matatabi	Workman Co, Ltd.	Unreleased	Unreleased	Aug 20, 2019	No	
Kanojo Step	Visual novel	Smee	Piacci	Unreleased	Unreleased	Mar 21, 2018	Yes	
Karigurashi Ren'ai	Visual novel	ASa Project	Entergram	Unreleased	Unreleased	Feb 21, 2019	No	
Karumaruka Circle	Visual novel	Saga Planets	Entergram	Unreleased	Unreleased	Jun 29, 2017	Yes	
Katahane: An' call Belle	Visual novel	10mile	Prototype	Unreleased	Unreleased	Jan 25, 2018	Yes	
Kawaii Deathu Desu	Beat 'em up	Top Hat Studios Inc	Top Hat Studios Inc, EastAsiaSoft	Aug 14, 2020	Unreleased	Jan 8, 2021	No	
Kazoku Keikaku: Re:Tsumugu Ito	Visual novel	Interlex	Interlex	Unreleased	Unreleased	Jun 10, 2014	No	
The Keeper of 4 Elements	Tower defense	A-steroids	Smartphone Labs	Dec 2, 2016	Dec 2, 2016	May 11, 2017	No	
Ken ga Kimi for V	Otome game	Rejet	Rejet	Unreleased	Unreleased	Mar 26, 2015	Yes	
Ken ga Kimi: Momoyo Tsuzuri	Otome game	Rejet	Rejet	Unreleased	Unreleased	Dec 22, 2016	Yes	
Kenka Bancho Otome	Otome game; Rhythm	Red Entertainment	Spike Chunsoft	Unreleased	Unreleased	May 19, 2016	No	
Kenka Bancho Otome: Kanzen Muketsu no My Honey	Otome game	Red Entertainment	Spike Chunsoft	Unreleased	Unreleased	Jul 27, 2017	No	
Kenka Bancho Otome: 2nd Rumble!!	Otome game; Fighting	Red Entertainment	Spike Chunsoft	Unreleased	Unreleased	Mar 19, 2019	No	
Kick & Fennick	Platform	Jaywalkers Interactive, Abstraction Games	Green Hill Studios	Feb 3, 2015	Feb 4, 2015	Aug 5, 2015	Yes	
KickBeat	Rhythm	Zen Studios	Zen Studios	Sep 3, 2013	Sep 4, 2013	Unreleased	Yes	
Kid Tripp	Platform	Four Horses	Four Horses	Jun 25, 2019	Jun 25, 2019	Unreleased	No	
Kidō Senshi Gundam SEED Battle Destiny	Action	Artdink	Bandai Namco Games	Unreleased	Unreleased	Jun 7, 2012	Yes	
Kidō Senshi Gundam: Battle Fortress	Simulation	Bandai Namco Entertainment	Bandai Namco Entertainment	Unreleased	Unreleased	Jul 16, 2015	No	
Kidou Senshi Gundam: Battle Operation Support Application	Application	Bandai Namco Entertainment	Bandai Namco Entertainment	Unreleased	Unreleased	May 30, 2013	No	
Kidō Senshi Gundam: Conquest V	Simulation	Bandai Namco Entertainment	Bandai Namco Entertainment	Unreleased	Unreleased	Aug 4, 2015	No	
Kilka Card Gods	Card game	Bamtang Games	Bamtang Games	Jun 10, 2014	Unreleased	Unreleased	No	
Killer Dolls United	Action	The Domaginarium	The Domaginarium	Jul 20, 2021	Jul 20, 2021	Unreleased	No	
Killzone: Mercenary	First-person shooter	Guerrilla Cambridge	Sony Computer Entertainment	Sep 10, 2013	Sep 4, 2013	Sep 5, 2013	Yes	
Kimi no Hitomi ni Hit Me	Visual novel	Giga	Giga	Unreleased	Unreleased	Feb 22, 2018	Yes	
Kimi o Aogi Otome wa Hime ni	Visual novel	PeasSoft	Entergram	Unreleased	Unreleased	Sep 29, 2016	Yes	
The King of Fighters '97 Global Match	Fighting	SNK	SNK	Apr 3, 2018	Apr 6, 2018	Apr 5, 2018	Yes	
Kin'iro Loveriche	Visual novel	Saga Planets	NekoNyan Ltd.	Unreleased	Unreleased	Dec 22, 2017	No	
Kin'iro no Corda 2ff	Role-playing	Ruby Party	Koei Tecmo	Unreleased	Unreleased	Dec 21, 2017	Yes	
Kin'iro no Corda 3: Another Sky feat. Jinnan / Shiseikan / Amane Gakuen	Visual novel	Ruby Party	Koei Tecmo	Unreleased	Unreleased	Sep 20, 2018	Yes	
Kin'iro no Corda 3: Full Voice Special	Visual novel	Ruby Party	Koei Tecmo	Unreleased	Unreleased	Sep 20, 2018	Yes	
Kin'iro no Corda 4	Role-playing	Ruby Party	Koei Tecmo	Unreleased	Unreleased	Mar 10, 2016	Yes	
Kin'iro no Corda: Octave	Visual novel; Rhythm	Ruby Party	Koei Tecmo	Unreleased	Unreleased	Feb 14, 2019	Yes	
King Oddball	Puzzle	10tons	10tons	Feb 4, 2014	Jan 8, 2014	Unreleased	Yes	
Kiss Ato	Visual novel	Giga	Entergram	Unreleased	Unreleased	Nov 26, 2015	Yes	
Kissbell	Visual novel	Giga	TGL	Unreleased	Unreleased	Aug 28, 2014	Yes	
Klap!! Kind Love and Punish	Otome game	Otomate, Design Factory	Idea Factory	Unreleased	Unreleased	Jul 30, 2015	Yes	
Klap!! Kind Love and Punish: Fun Party	Otome game	Otomate, Design Factory	Idea Factory	Unreleased	Unreleased	Mar 30, 2017	Yes	
Knight Solitaire	Puzzle	Creobit	4 Hit	Mar 29, 2016	Nov 26, 2015	Unreleased	No	
Knightin'+	Dungeon crawler	Ratalaika Games	Ratalaika Games	Feb 18, 2020	Feb 18, 2020	Feb 18, 2020	Yes	
Knobswitch	Application	Tiredtrope	Tiredtrope	Nov 22, 2016	Unreleased	Unreleased	No	
Knock-Knock	Survival horror	Ice-Pick Lodge	Ice-Pick Lodge	Feb 23, 2016	Feb 18, 2016	Unreleased	No	
Knytt Underground	Platform	Green Hill Games, Nifflas	Ripstone	Dec 18, 2012	Dec 21, 2012	Unreleased	Yes	
Koezaru wa Akai Hana: Koi wa Tsuki ni Michibikareru	Otome game	Operetta Due	Dramatic Create	Unreleased	Unreleased	Jun 23, 2016	Yes	
Koi	Puzzle	Dotoyou	Oasis Games	Sep 26, 2017	Unreleased	Unreleased	No	
Koisuru Otome to Shugo no Tate: Bara no Seibo	Visual novel	Axl	Axl	Unreleased	Unreleased	Feb 26, 2016	No	
Kono Aozora ni Yakusoku o	Visual novel	Giga	Entergram	Unreleased	Unreleased	Dec 17, 2015	Yes	
Kono Ōzora ni, Tsubasa o Hirogete: Cruise Sign	Visual novel	Pulltop	5pb.	Unreleased	Unreleased	Mar 31, 2016	No	
Kono Subarashii Sekai ni Shukufuku o! Attack of the Destroyer	Shoot 'em up	5pb.	5pb.	Unreleased	Unreleased	Sep 7, 2017	Yes	
Kono Subarashii Sekai ni Shukufuku o! Kono Yokubukai Game ni Shinpan o!	Visual novel	5pb.	5pb.	Unreleased	Unreleased	Sep 7, 2017	Yes	
Kono Uta ga Owattara: When This Song Is Over	Visual novel	Hourglass, Snowflake	One Draw	Unreleased	Unreleased	Feb 27, 2014	Yes	
Koroshiya to Strawberry	Otome game	Broccoli	Broccoli	Unreleased	Unreleased	Aug 23, 2018	Yes	
Koshotengai no Hashihime	Otome game	Adelta	Dramatic Create	Unreleased	Unreleased	Sep 27, 2018	Yes	
Krinkle Krusher	Tower defense	Ilusis Interactive Graphics	Ilusis Interactive Graphics	Apr 7, 2015	Aug 5, 2016	Unreleased	No	
Kud Wafter Converted Edition	Visual novel	Key	Prototype	Unreleased	Unreleased	Dec 19, 2013	Yes	
Kujiragami no Tearstilla	Visual novel	Whirlpool	Piacci	Unreleased	Unreleased	Jul 28, 2016	Yes	
Kung Fu Rabbit	Platform	cTools Studio	Neko Entertainment	Jul 16, 2013	Jul 3, 2013	Apr 17, 2014	Yes	
Kung Fury: Street Rage	Beat 'em up	Hello There	Hello There	May 25, 2017	May 25, 2017	Unreleased	No	
Kurenai no Homura: Sanada Ninpōchō	Otome game	Otomate	Idea Factory	Unreleased	Unreleased	Jun 28, 2018	Yes	
Kurogane Kaikitan: Ichigo Ichie	Visual novel	Minato Station	Happinet Games	Unreleased	Unreleased	Jun 25, 2015	Yes	
Kurogane Kaikitan: Senya Ichiya	Visual novel	Minato Station	Happinet Games	Unreleased	Unreleased	Jan 29, 2015	Yes	
Kurogane Kaikijong	Mahjong	Red Flagship	Red Flagship	Unreleased	Unreleased	Oct 1, 2015	No	
Kyōkai no Shirayuki	Otome game	Otomate	Idea Factory	Unreleased	Unreleased	May 26, 2016	Yes	
La-Mulana EX	Platform	Pygmy Studio	Asterizm (JP); Rising Star Games (NA/EU)	Mar 3, 2015	Mar 4, 2015	Dec 17, 2014	Yes	
Lara Croft Go	Puzzle	Square Enix Montreal	Square Enix	Dec 3, 2016	Dec 3, 2016	Unreleased	Yes	
Laser Disco Defenders	Shooter	Out of Bounds Games	Excalibur Games	Aug 2, 2016	Nov 22, 2016	Unreleased	No	
The Last Blade 2	Fighting	SNK, Code Mystics	SNK	May 24, 2016	May 25, 2016	May 25, 2016	Yes	
Last Wings	Shooter	Vertice Games	Vertice Games	Jul 12, 2016	Dec 6, 2016	Unreleased	Yes	
League of Evil	Platform	Ravenous Games, Ratalaika Games	Ratalaika Games	Apr 10, 2018	Apr 10, 2018	Unreleased	No	
Legend of the Skyfish	Action	Mgaia Studio	Ratalaika Games	Aug 27, 2019	Unreleased	Unreleased	No	
The Legend of Dark Witch	Platform	Flyhigh Works	Indie System (JP); Qubic Games (NA/EU)	Apr 25, 2017	Apr 25, 2017	May 27, 2015	Yes	
The Legend of Heroes: Trails at Sunrise	Role-playing	UserJoy Technology	UserJoy Technology	Unreleased	Unreleased	Dec 26, 2016	No	
The Legend of Heroes: Trails from Zero Evolution	Role-playing	Nihon Falcom	Nihon Falcom	Unreleased	Unreleased	Oct 18, 2012	Yes	
The Legend of Heroes: Trails in the Sky Evolution	Role-playing	Nihon Falcom	Nihon Falcom	Unreleased	Unreleased	Jun 11, 2015	Yes	
The Legend of Heroes: Trails in the Sky SC Evolution	Role-playing	Nihon Falcom	Nihon Falcom	Unreleased	Unreleased	Dec 10, 2015	Yes	
The Legend of Heroes: Trails in the Sky the 3rd Evolution	Role-playing	Nihon Falcom	Nihon Falcom	Unreleased	Unreleased	Jul 14, 2016	Yes	
The Legend of Heroes: Trails of Cold Steel	Role-playing	Nihon Falcom	Nihon Falcom (JP); Xseed Games (NA); NIS America (EU)	Dec 22, 2015	Jan 29, 2016	Sep 26, 2013	Yes	
The Legend of Heroes: Trails of Cold Steel II	Role-playing	Nihon Falcom	Nihon Falcom (JP); Xseed Games (NA); NIS America (EU)	Sep 6, 2016	Nov 11, 2016	Sep 25, 2014	Yes	
The Legend of Heroes: Trails to Azure Evolution	Role-playing	Nihon Falcom	Nihon Falcom	Unreleased	Unreleased	Jun 12, 2014	Yes	
Legends of War: Patton	Turn-based strategy	Enigma Software Productions	Slitherine Software	Jul 8, 2013	Apr 4, 2013	Unreleased	Yes	
Lego Batman 2: DC Super Heroes	Action-adventure	Traveller's Tales, TT Fusion	Warner Bros. Interactive Entertainment	Jun 19, 2012	Jun 27, 2012	Unreleased	Yes	
Lego Batman 3: Beyond Gotham	Action-adventure	Traveller's Tales, TT Fusion	Warner Bros. Interactive Entertainment	Nov 11, 2014	Nov 14, 2014	Unreleased	Yes	
Lego Harry Potter: Years 5–7	Action-adventure	Traveller's Tales, TT Fusion	Warner Bros. Interactive Entertainment	Mar 6, 2012	Mar 9, 2012	Unreleased	Yes	
Lego Jurassic World	Action-adventure	TT Fusion	Warner Bros. Interactive Entertainment	Jun 9, 2015	Jun 12, 2015	Unreleased	Yes	
Lego Legends of Chima: Laval's Journey	Action-adventure	TT Fusion	Warner Bros. Interactive Entertainment	Jun 25, 2013	Jun 21, 2013	Unreleased	No	
Lego The Hobbit	Action-adventure	Traveller's Tales, TT Fusion	Warner Bros. Interactive Entertainment	Apr 8, 2014	Apr 11, 2014	Unreleased	Yes	
Lego The Lord of the Rings	Action-adventure	Traveller's Tales, TT Fusion	Warner Bros. Interactive Entertainment	Oct 30, 2012	Nov 21, 2012	Unreleased	Yes	
Lego Marvel's Avengers	Action-adventure	Traveller's Tales, TT Fusion	Warner Bros. Interactive Entertainment	Jan 26, 2016	Jan 26, 2016	Apr 28, 2016	Yes	
Lego Marvel Super Heroes: Universe in Peril	Action-adventure	Traveller's Tales, TT Fusion	Warner Bros. Interactive Entertainment	Oct 22, 2013	Nov 15, 2013	Unreleased	No	
The Lego Movie Videogame	Action-adventure	TT Fusion	Warner Bros. Interactive Entertainment	Feb 4, 2014	Feb 14, 2014	Unreleased	Yes	
Lego Ninjago: Nindroids	Action-adventure	Hellbent Games	Warner Bros. Interactive Entertainment	Jul 29, 2014	Aug 1, 2014	Nov 22, 2016	Yes	
Lego Ninjago: Shadow of Ronin	Action-adventure	TT Fusion	Warner Bros. Interactive Entertainment	Mar 24, 2015	Mar 27, 2015	Unreleased	Yes	
Lego Star Wars: The Force Awakens	Action-adventure	TT Fusion	Warner Bros. Interactive Entertainment	Jun 28, 2016	Jun 28, 2016	Oct 13, 2016	Yes	
Lemmings Touch	Puzzle	d3t	Sony Computer Entertainment	May 27, 2014	May 28, 2014	Unreleased	No	
Let's Fish! Hooked On	Sports	SIMS Co., Ltd.	JP: Kadokawa Games; WW: Wired Productions	Jan 29, 2013	Jan 30, 2013	Mar 29, 2012	Yes	
Letter Quest: Grimm's Journey Remastered	Puzzle	Bacon Bandit Games	Digerati	May 17, 2016	May 18, 2016	Unreleased	No	
Level 22	Stealth	Noego Games	Moving Player	Feb 11, 2016	Feb 11, 2016	Unreleased	Yes	
Lichtspeer	Action	Lichthund	Crunching Koalas	Apr 11, 2017	Apr 11, 2017	Unreleased	Yes	
Licky the Lucky Lizard Lives Again	Platform	BezDoesGames	BezDoesGames	Sep 5, 2017	Sep 1, 2017	Unreleased	Yes	
Limbo	Puzzle-platform	Playdead, Double Eleven	Playdead	Jun 4, 2013	Jun 4, 2013	Jun 4, 2013	Yes	
Link-a-Pix Deluxe	Puzzle	Lightwood Games	Lightwood Games	Jan 7, 2020	Jan 7, 2020	Jan 16, 2020	No	
Little Adventure on the Prairie	Adventure	Infinite Madaa	Infinite Madaa	Feb 22, 2018	Feb 20, 2018	Unreleased	Yes	
LittleBigPlanet PS Vita	Platform	Double Eleven, Tarsier Studios, XDev Studio Europe	Sony Computer Entertainment	Sep 25, 2012	Sep 19, 2012	Sep 20, 2012	No	
Little Busters! Converted Edition	Visual novel; Sports	Key	Prototype	Unreleased	Unreleased	Mar 22, 2012	Yes	
Little Deviants	Arcade	Bigbig Studios	Sony Computer Entertainment	Feb 15, 2012	Feb 22, 2012	Dec 17, 2011	No	
Little Red Lie	Role-playing	WZO Games	WZO Games	Jan 9, 2018	Jan 9, 2018	Unreleased	No	
London Detective Mysteria	Otome game	Karin Entertainment	JP: Karin Entertainment; WW: Xseed Games	Dec 18, 2018	Dec 18, 2018	Feb 11, 2016	Yes	
Lone Survivor: The Director's Cut	Survival horror	Superflat Games	Curve Digital	Sep 24, 2013	Sep 24, 2013	Unreleased	Yes	
The Longest 5 Minutes	Adventure	Syupro-DX	Nippon Ichi Software	Feb 13, 2018	Feb 16, 2018	Jul 28, 2016	Yes	
The Long Reach	Survival horror	Merge Games	Merge Games	Aug 14, 2018	Aug 15, 2018	Unreleased	Yes	
Looney Tunes Galactic Sports	Sports	Virtual Toys	Sony Computer Entertainment	Unreleased	May 27, 2015	Unreleased	No	
Lord of Apocalypse	Action	Access Games	Square Enix	Unreleased	Unreleased	Dec 17, 2011	Yes	
The Lost Child	Role-playing	Kadokawa Games	Kadokawa Games (JP); NIS America (NA/EU)	Jun 19, 2018	Jun 22, 2018	Aug 24, 2017	Yes	
Lost Cube, The	Adventure	JanduSoft	EastAsiaSoft	May 5, 2021	Unreleased	Unreleased	No	
Lost Dimension	Role-playing	Lancarse	FuRyu (JP); Atlus USA (NA); NIS America (EU)	Jul 7, 2015	Aug 28, 2015	Aug 8, 2014	Yes	
love clear	Visual novel	Giga	Giga	Unreleased	Unreleased	Jan 25, 2019	No	
Lovely×cation 1&2	Visual novel; Dating sim	Hibiki Works	5pb.	Unreleased	Unreleased	May 21, 2015	Yes	
Love Live! School Idol Paradise Vol. 1: Printemps	Rhythm	Dingo	Kadokawa Games	Unreleased	Unreleased	Aug 28, 2014	No	
Love Live! School Idol Paradise Vol. 2: BiBi	Rhythm	Dingo	Kadokawa Games	Unreleased	Unreleased	Aug 28, 2014	No	
Love Live! School Idol Paradise Vol. 3: Lily White	Rhythm	Dingo	Kadokawa Games	Unreleased	Unreleased	Aug 28, 2014	No	
Lovely Quest: Unlimited	Visual novel	Hooksoft	Piacci	Unreleased	Unreleased	Mar 27, 2014	Yes	
Love of Ren'ai Kōtei of Love!	Visual novel	Harukaze	Entergram	Unreleased	Unreleased	May 25, 2017	Yes	
Love Quiz: Koisuru Otome no Final Answer	Otome game; Quiz	Emiq	Asgard Japan	Unreleased	Unreleased	Dec 10, 2015	Yes	
Love Revenge	Visual novel	Dear	TGL	Unreleased	Unreleased	Oct 29, 2015	Yes	
Luckslinger	Platform	Duckbridge	EastAsiaSoft	Jun 11, 2021	Jun 11, 2021	Jun 11, 2021	No	
Lucky Dog 1	Otome game	Tennenouji	Prototype	Unreleased	Unreleased	Mar 8, 2018	Yes	
Luftrausers	Shooter	Vlambeer	Devolver Digital	Mar 18, 2014	Mar 19, 2014	Feb 19, 2015	Yes	
Lumines Electronic Symphony	Puzzle	Q Entertainment	Ubisoft	Feb 15, 2012	Feb 22, 2012	Apr 19, 2012	North America/Japan only	
Luminous Arc Infinity	Tactical role-playing	Marvelous	Marvelous	Unreleased	Unreleased	Aug 6, 2015	Yes	
Lumo	Action-adventure	Triple Eh?	Rising Star Games	Jul 5, 2016	Jul 5, 2016	Oct 20, 2016	No	

== See also ==
- List of PlayStation Vita games (A–D)
- List of PlayStation Vita games (E–H)
- List of PlayStation Vita games (M–O)
- List of PlayStation Vita games (P–R)
- List of PlayStation Vita games (S)
- List of PlayStation Vita games (T–V)
- List of PlayStation Vita games (W–Z)
