= Steam-Heart's =

1994 shoot 'em up and eroge video game developed by Giga and published by TGL

- PC-98 cover art
- Developer: Giga
- Publisher: TGL
- Platforms: PC-98, PC Engine Super CD-ROM², Sega Saturn
- Release: PC-98: JP: March 15, 1994; PC Engine Super CD-ROM²: JP: March 22, 1996; Sega Saturn: JP: September 23, 1998
- Genres: Scrolling shooter, eroge
- Modes: Single-player, multiplayer

Steam-Heart's (Note: Suchīmu hātsu (スチーム・ハーツ)) is a 1994 vertically scrolling shooter and eroge developed by Giga and published by TGL. The story follows two siblings as they fight off a virus that is possessing the people in their world. The game features shooter gameplay paired with ample erotic cutscenes with scantily clad women. Steam-Heart's was initially released on PC-98 personal computers on March 15, 1994; a version for the PC Engine Super CD-ROM² System was released in 1996 followed by another for the Sega Saturn in 1998, all of which were for the Japanese market. Critics generally found the gameplay to be average, with the erotic content being the sole distinguishing feature.

== Gameplay ==

Top: The gameplay is standard for vertically scrolling shooters. (Saturn version shown) Bottom: The erotic cutscenes were common discussion points among critics. (PC-98 version shown)

Steam-Heart's is a vertically scrolling shoot 'em up and eroge. There are 8 levels in total, as well as single-player and two-player modes. The primary weapon on the player's ship can either be a vulcan cannon or laser. These shot types can be upgraded or swapped by picking up power-ups. The player can also choose from a variety of secondary weapons which vary between the versions of Steam-Heart's, but include fixed turrets, flamethrowers, and satellite ships that hunt down enemies among others. The ship can also temporarily boost in any direction to dodge enemies or pick up items. Completing each stage results in a cutscene told through a succession of still images.

The player only has one life but can take about six hits before losing the life. There are only continues in the cooperative two-player mode. In single-player mode, the player restarts the level after losing a life. The Saturn version includes an arcade mode (a mode devoid of all cutscenes and character dialogue), and a score attack mode.

== Plot ==
The game is set in a world where people have been taken over by a virus, altering their behavior. Two siblings, a male named Blow and a hermaphrodite Falla are immune to the virus and set off to fight it. The characters exchange dialog during gameplay to progress the story. The bosses at the end of each stage are mecha piloted by scantily clad women including catgirls. After each boss is defeated, Blow and Falla interact with the women. Blow ejaculates into the boss character to cure them from the virus.

== Development and release ==
Steam-Heart's was developed by Giga and published by TGL. The character designs were done by animator Takahiro Kimura. The game is unusual for combining a shooting game with eroticism, as Japanese erotic games are more typically genres like role playing, adventure, strategy, or even beat 'em ups. It was originally released for the NEC PC-9800 series of personal computers in Japan on March 15, 1994. The game's first port was on March 22, 1996 for the PC Engine Super CD-ROM² System. For this release, all the graphics were redrawn, the secondary weapons were weakened or removed altogether, and the two-player mode was pulled. It was released near the end of the system's lifespan as its last shooter.

A port for the Sega Saturn was released on September 23, 1998, as the Saturn was beginning to lose market share in preparation for the November launch of Dreamcast. The Saturn version comes with a small yellow seal warning of the erotic content of the game. The game did not receive a red seal, which is for even more explicit content. Again, all the graphics were redrawn, but this version retains the cooperative mode and also includes more secondary weapons. The Saturn version also makes more use of the scaling and rotation effects supported by the hardware. Eroge was known for being more graphic on personal computers than consoles, so when the game was ported to the PC Engine and Saturn, the cutscenes were completely redrawn to be less graphic, albeit more suggestive. The scenes on the Saturn are not visually explicit, but are fully voice acted, including sounds of moans. The Saturn version is the most censored. The text scrolling in the original was also replaced with voice acting in the console versions.

== Reception ==
Reception

Review scores
Publication	Score
Famitsu	17/40 (SAT)
ReVival	7/10 (PCE)
Sega Saturn Magazine (JP)	6.0/10 (SAT) (Note: Sega Saturn Magazine scores are aggregated. Two reviewers gave a 5/10 while a third gave an 8/10.)
Super Game Power	4.3/5 (SAT)
Video Games	50/100 (SAT)

PC Engine Fan praised the quality of the cutscene graphics and character designs in a preview of the PC Engine version. Revival did not find the game to be much of a technical feat, despite coming out towards the end of the system's life. They felt the game was enjoyable but ultimately found it to be a weaker offering than other shooters on the system such as Gate of Thunder (1992).

Reviewing the Saturn version, Ralph Karels in Video Games magazine wrote that the game was standard shooter fare, and was only worthwhile for those that enjoyed the erotic cutscenes. He believed the game could not stand up to the likes of Radiant Silvergun and R-Type Delta (both released in 1998), and found the graphics were not much of an improvement over the PC Engine version. Four reviewers for Famitsu gave the Saturn version a score of 17/40. Three reviewers covered the game in Sega Saturn Magazine (Japan). The two more critical reviewers felt the gameplay was unbalanced and generally uninspired. One criticized how the cutscenes would show still images for too long while the voices continued on top, and they compared the game to old eroge for personal computers. The more receptive reviewer appreciated the erotic themes, and felt the bullet hell gameplay was balanced and enjoyable. Super Game Power was also receptive of the game giving it a positive score. Superjuegos noted that aside from the erotic content, the game can't compete in terms of graphics or gameplay to games like Radiant Silvergun or Galactic Attack.

In a retrospective review, Kurt Kalata of Hardcore Gaming 101 wrote that beyond the unique approach to cinematics and the dodge mechanic, the game does very little to distinguish itself from other shooters. He deemed the Saturn version the best because of the improved graphics and gameplay, and the PC Engine version the worst because of cut content and slower gameplay. He believed the Saturn version was better than most Raiden games, worse than Dodonpachi and Terra Diver (both 1997), and about on par with Batsugun (1996).

== See also ==
- Variable Geo—Fighting game series with eroge from the same developer
