= Technical Group Laboratory =

Japanese system integrator

TGL, Inc.
- Native name: 株式会社テイジイエル
- Romanized name: Kabushiki-gaisha Ti Ji Eru
- Founded: July 1984
- Headquarters: Japan, Chūō-ku, Osaka
- Number of employees: 241 (2019)
- Website: tgl.co.jp

TGL, Inc. (Technical Group Laboratory, Inc.) (株式会社テイジイエル Kabushiki-gaisha Ti Ji Eru) is a Japanese company dealing with developing, constructing and planning of various computer systems and software. This company supports the operating systems: Java, C, C++, Oracle, asp, Linux, Unix, Windows NT.

== Subsidiaries ==
- Entergram Inc. (株式会社エンターグラム, Kabushiki-gaisha Entāguramu)(formerly TGL PLANNING INC. (株式会社テイジイエル企画, Kabushiki-gaisha Ti Ji Eru Kikaku) and TGL SALES INC. (株式会社テイジイエル販売, Kabushiki-gaisha Ti Ji Eru Hanbai)): It is TGL's video game development and publishing subsidiary. TGL Planning was founded on August 5, 1999, while TGL Sales was founded on December 14, 2005. The two merged to form Entergram on April 1, 2016.
  - Partner Brand (パートナーブランド, Pātonā Burando): It consists of the game brands part of Entergram.
  - Giga - a brand used for adult titles.
  - Pink Clover - a brand used for BL titles.
- TGL Career Produce Inc. (株式会社テイジイエルキャリアプロデュース, Kabushiki-gaisha Ti Ji Eru Kyaria Purodyūsu): It is TGL's employment service subsidiary.
- Technical Group Laboratory international (TGL國際): It is TGL's Korean subsidiary.

=== Former subsidiaries ===
- Taiwan TGL Corporation (台灣帝技爺如科技股份有限公司): It is a video game publisher for Taiwan market. The company was founded in 2000 following 4 years of establishing TGL Taiwan branch. In 2002–10, Soft-World International Corporation increases its stake to Taiwan TGL Corporation to 72.46, making it the subsidiary of SWIC. In 2003, Taiwan TGL Corporation was reported to be merged into Game Flier International Corporation (遊戲新幹線), but the process of dissolving Taiwan TGL Corporation would only take place at the end of June 2009.

== Games ==
=== TGL ===
| Title | Platform(s) | Release date |
|---|---|---|
| Sword Dancer | PC-9800 series | March 25, 1992 |
| Edge | PC-9800 series | January 15, 1993 |
| Farland Story | PC-9800 series | October 15, 1993 |
| Farland Story | Windows | July 21, 1995 |
| Farland Story Denki: Arc Ou no Ensei | PC-9800 series | February 10, 1994 |
| Farland Story: Tenshi no Namida | PC-9800 series | July 15, 1994 |
| Advanced V.G. | PC Engine CD-ROM² | July 22, 1994 |
| Advanced V.G. | PlayStation | April 19, 1996 |
| Advanced V.G. | Sega Saturn | March 14, 1997 |
| Farland Story: Hakugin no Tsubasa | PC-9800 series | November 11, 1994 |
| Farland Story | Super Famicom | February 24, 1995 |
| Farland Story: Daichi no Kizuna | PC-9800 series | March 17, 1995 |
| Farland Story: Kamigami no Isen | PC-9800 series | July 21, 1995 |
| Super Variable Geo | Super Famicom | July 21, 1995 |
| Farland Story: Juuou no Akashi | PC-9800 series | October 11, 1995 |
| Appareden - Fukuryuu no Shou | PC-9800 series | December 8, 1995 |
| Farland Story 2 | Super Famicom | December 22, 1995 |
| Farland Story: Kyoushin no Miyako | Windows | July 26, 1996 |
| Farland Saga | Windows | November 22, 1996 |
| Farland Saga | Sega Saturn | January 29, 1998 |
| Farland Story: Habou no Mai | Windows | March 14, 1997 |
| Eko no Kids: Taga Tame Hi Kane wa Naru | PlayStation | April 18, 1997 |
| Tilk: Aoi Umi kara Kita Shoujo | PlayStation | April 25, 1997 |
| Tilk: Aoi Umi kara Kita Shoujo | Sega Saturn | December 23, 1997 |
| Farland Saga: Toki no Michishirube | Windows | May 30, 1997 |
| Farland Saga: Toki no Michishirube | Sega Saturn | December 3, 1998 |
| Farland Saga: Toki no Michishirube | PlayStation | April 28, 1999 |
| Farland Story: Yottsu no Fuuin | Windows | June 20, 1997 |
| Farland Story: Yottsu no Fuuin | PlayStation | November 27, 1997 |
| Tenshi Doumei | PlayStation | April 23, 1998 |
| Mahoutsukai ni Naru Houhou | Sega Saturn | August 27, 1998 |
| Mahoutsukai ni Naru Houhou | PlayStation | February 18, 1999 |
| Advanced V.G. 2 | PlayStation | September 23, 1998 |
| Sengoku Bishōjo Emaki | PC-9800 series | 1998 |
| The Dream Circus | PlayStation | February 25, 1999 |
| Dark Solid | Windows | June 8, 1999 |
| Farland Odyssey ~Densetsu wo Tsugu Mono~ | Windows | July 9, 1999 |
| Farland Odyssey II ~Kimi ni Okuru Serenade~ | Windows | September 22, 2000 |
| Farland Symphony | Windows | February 15, 2002 |
| Baldr Bullet: Equilibrium | PlayStation 2 | October 25, 2007 |

Giga ports

| Title | Platform(s) | Release date |
|---|---|---|
| Steam-Heart's | PC Engine CD-ROM² | March 22, 1996 |
| Steam-Heart's | Sega Saturn | September 23, 1998 |
| Baldr Force Standard Edition | Windows | March 23, 2007 |
| Kono Aozora ni Yakusoku o: Tenohira no Rakuen | PlayStation Portable | June 25, 2009 |
| Hotchkiss | PlayStation Vita | August 29, 2013 |
| Bitter Smile. | PlayStation Vita | November 28, 2013 |
| Anoko wa Ore Kara Hanarenai | PlayStation Vita | March 27, 2014 |
| Anoko wa Ore Kara Hanarenai | PlayStation 4 | December 18, 2014 |
| KissBell | PlayStation Vita | August 28, 2014 |
| Parfait | PlayStation Vita | February 26, 2015 |
| Harvest OverRay | PlayStation Vita | June 25, 2015 |
| Kiss Art | PlayStation Vita | November 26, 2015 |
| Kono Aozora ni Yakusoku o | PlayStation Vita | December 17, 2015 |
| Shitsuji ga Aruji o Erabu Toki | PlayStation Vita | February 25, 2016 |
| Shitsuji ga Aruji o Erabu Toki | PlayStation 4 | February 25, 2016 |
| Shirogane x Spirits! | PlayStation Vita | March 24, 2016 |

Other Ports

| Title | Platform(s) | Release date | Original developer |
|---|---|---|---|
| Natsumegu | PlayStation Vita | July 30, 2015 | Cotton Soft |
| Renai Revenge | PlayStation Vita | October 29, 2015 | De@r |
| Renai Revenge | PlayStation 4 | December 17, 2015 | De@r |

Pink Clover

| Title | Platform(s) | Release date |
|---|---|---|
| 24-ji, Kimi no Heart wa Nusumareru: Kaitou Jade | Windows | March 19, 2004 |

=== Entergram ===
Original games

| Title | Platform(s) | Release date | Original developer |
|---|---|---|---|
| Saki: Zenkoku-hen Plus | PlayStation Vita | December 22, 2016 | Kaga Create |

Giga ports

| Title | Platform(s) | Release date |
|---|---|---|
| RepKiss | PlayStation Vita | April 13, 2017 |
| RepKiss | PlayStation 4 | April 13, 2017 |
| RepKiss | Nintendo Switch | December 20, 2018 |
| Amaekata wa Kanojo Nari ni. | PlayStation Vita | October 26, 2017 |
| Amaekata wa Kanojo Nari ni. | PlayStation 4 | October 26, 2017 |
| Amaekata wa Kanojo Nari ni. | Nintendo Switch | January 24, 2019 |
| Kimi no Hitomi ni Hit Me | PlayStation Vita | February 22, 2018 |
| Kimi no Hitomi ni Hit Me | PlayStation 4 | February 22, 2018 |
| Kimi no Hitomi ni Hit Me | Nintendo Switch | August 23, 2018 |
| Soi Kano: Gyutto Dakishimete | PlayStation Vita | February 21, 2019 |
| Soi Kano: Gyutto Dakishimete | PlayStation 4 | February 21, 2019 |
| Soi Kano: Gyutto Dakishimete | Nintendo Switch | February 21, 2019 |
| FullKiss | PlayStation Vita | March 28, 2019 |
| FullKiss | PlayStation 4 | March 28, 2019 |

Other ports

| Title | Platform(s) | Release date | Original developer |
|---|---|---|---|
| Strawberry Nauts | PlayStation Vita | July 28, 2016 | Hooksoft |
| PuraMai Wars V | PlayStation Vita | August 25, 2016 | ASa Project |
| Kimi o Aogi Otome wa Hime ni | PlayStation Vita | September 29, 2016 | PeasSoft |
| PriministAr | PlayStation Vita | September 29, 2016 | Hooksoft |
| Kimi o Aogi Otome wa Hime ni | PlayStation Vita | September 29, 2016 | PeasSoft |
| Saka Agari Hurricane Portable | PlayStation Vita | October 27, 2016 | Alchemist |
| id: RebirthSession | PlayStation Vita | November 24, 2016 | root nuko |
| Timepiece Ensemble | PlayStation Vita | February 23, 2017 | GLace |
| Hatsuyuki Sakura | PlayStation Vita | March 23, 2017 | Saga Planets |
| Hanasaki Work Spring! | PlayStation Vita | April 27, 2017 | Saga Planets |
| Hanasaki Work Spring! | PlayStation 4 | November 22, 2018 | Saga Planets |
| Owaru Sekai to Birthday | PlayStation Vita | May 11, 2017 | Cotton Soft |
| Love of Ren'ai Koutei of LOVE! | PlayStation Vita | May 25, 2017 | Harukaze |
| Karumaruka Circle | PlayStation Vita | June 29, 2017 | Saga Planets |
| Karumaruka Circle | PlayStation 4 | May 24, 2018 | Saga Planets |
| Futagoza no Paradox | PlayStation Vita | August 24, 2017 | Cotton Soft |
| Tonari ni Kanojo no Iru Shiawase: Two Farce | PlayStation Vita | November 22, 2017 | Prekano |
| Tonari ni Kanojo no Iru Shiawase: Two Farce | PlayStation 4 | November 22, 2017 | Prekano |
| Sen no Hatou, Arazome no Hime | PlayStation Vita | December 21, 2017 | Aria |
| Sen no Hatou, Arazome no Hime | PlayStation 4 | December 21, 2017 | Aria |
| Ninki Seiyuu no Tsukurikata | PlayStation Vita | January 25, 2018 | MintCUBE |
| Ninki Seiyuu no Tsukurikata | PlayStation 4 | January 25, 2018 | MintCUBE |
| Azayaka na Irodori no Naka de, Kimi Rashiku | PlayStation Vita | February 22, 2018 | Prekano |
| Azayaka na Irodori no Naka de, Kimi Rashiku | PlayStation 4 | February 22, 2018 | Prekano |
| D.S. -Dal Segno- | PlayStation Vita | March 22, 2018 | Citrus |
| D.S. -Dal Segno- | PlayStation 4 | March 22, 2018 | Citrus |
| NadeRevo! Nadeshiko Revolution | PlayStation Vita | April 26, 2018 | Jitaku Studio |
| Mikagami Sumika no Seifuku Katsudou | PlayStation Vita | May 24, 2018 | Prekano |
| Mikagami Sumika no Seifuku Katsudou | PlayStation 4 | May 24, 2018 | Prekano |
| Tonari ni Kanojo no Iru Shiawase: Winter Guest | PlayStation 4 | June 28, 2018 | Prekano |
| Tonari ni Kanojo no Iru Shiawase: Winter Guest | PlayStation Vita | July 2, 2018 | Prekano |
| Higurashi no Naku Koro ni Hou | Nintendo Switch | July 26, 2018 | 07th Expansion |
| Higurashi no Naku Koro ni Hou | PlayStation 4 | January 24, 2019 | 07th Expansion |
| Daitoshokan no Hitsujikai: Library Party | Nintendo Switch | July 26, 2018 | Aria |
| Daitoshokan no Hitsujikai: Library Party | PlayStation 4 | February 21, 2019 | Aria |
| Floral Flowlove | PlayStation Vita | August 23, 2018 | Saga Planets |
| Floral Flowlove | PlayStation 4 | August 23, 2018 | Saga Planets |
| Boku to Nurse no Kenshuu Nisshi | PlayStation Vita | August 23, 2018 | Prekano |
| Boku to Nurse no Kenshuu Nisshi | PlayStation 4 | August 23, 2018 | Prekano |
| Tayutama 2: You're the only one | PlayStation Vita | September 27, 2018 | Lump of Sugar |
| Tayutama 2: You're the only one | PlayStation 4 | September 27, 2018 | Lump of Sugar |
| Sakura Sakura | PlayStation Vita | October 25, 2018 | Hi Quality |
| Sakura Sakura | PlayStation 4 | October 25, 2018 | Hi Quality |
| Suki to Suki to de Sankaku Renai | PlayStation Vita | January 24, 2019 | ASa Project |
| Suki to Suki to de Sankaku Renai | PlayStation 4 | January 24, 2019 | ASa Project |
| Karigurashi Renai | PlayStation Vita | February 21, 2019 | ASa Project |
| Karigurashi Renai | PlayStation 4 | February 21, 2019 | ASa Project |
| Haruoto Alice Gram: Snow Drop | PlayStation Vita | March 28, 2019 | NanaWind |
| Haruoto Alice Gram: Snow Drop | PlayStation 4 | March 28, 2019 | NanaWind |

Licensed games

| Title | Platform(s) | Release date |
|---|---|---|
| Kono Subarashii Sekai ni Shukufuku wo! | PlayStation Vita | June 27, 2019 |
| Kono Subarashii Sekai ni Shukufuku wo! | PlayStation 4 | June 27, 2019 |

=== Staff ===
- Kazue Yamamoto

Character Designs

- Sasaki Ikuko (佐々木郁子) - Sengoku Bishoujo Emaki, Farland Odyssey series.
- Tomokazu Kazue
- Takahiro Kimura – Variable Geo series.
