= Chiharu Tezuka =

Japanese voice actress (born 1974)

- 手塚 ちはる
- Born: Misako Kimizuka (君塚 美さ子); October 27, 1974 (age 52); Taitō Ward, Tokyo, Japan
- Occupation: Voice actress
- Years active: 1993–2010
- Agent: Arts Vision
- Website: Official profile

Chiharu Tezuka (手塚 ちはる, Tezuka Chiharu; born October 27, 1974) is a former Japanese voice actress affiliated with Arts Vision.

== Biography ==
Tezuka was born on October 27, 1974, in Taitō Ward, Tokyo, Japan under the birth name of Misako Kimizuka.

She was a graduate of the Japan Narration Acting Institute.

In 1991, she formed the idol group "Crystal A" with alumni Hekiru Shiina, Kaoru Fujino, and Yumeto Yazawa.

== Personality ==
Her hobbies and interests included watching baseball, playing badminton, and cooking. She is a fan of the Yomiuri Giants baseball team.

She usually portrayed the roles of cheerful young women and female characters with a mysterious vibe.

== Filmography ==
=== Television animation ===
1997

- Yukari Kashima, Staff in Vampire Princess Miyu
- Children in Cyber Marionette J
- Battle Athletes

1998

- Maki Rowel in Ginga Hyōryū Vifam
- Girl Student in Nazca
- Reika Yamamoto in Serial Experiments Lain
- Fumiko Makuragi in St. Luminous Mission High School
- Chibi, George in Bakusō Kyōdai Let's & Go!! MAX
- Willy in Marvelous Melmo

1999

- Mi in Cyborg Kuro-chan
- Karen Jordan in AD Police
- Misaki in Devil Lady
- Yoshiharu in Let's Dance With Papa

2000

- Kaga in Steel Angel Kurumi

2001

- Kenta in X
- Marimo Marino in Crush Gear Turbo
- Johnny McGregor, Boy (D) in Beyblade
- Mabel in Kirby: Right Back at Ya!
- Lasagna, Hole in Groove Adventure Rave

2002

- Eiko Yano, Receptionist in Witch Hunter Robin

2004

- Kanako Kinoshita in Detective Conan

2005

- Oosumi in Onmyou Taisenki

2006

- Cellaria Markelight in Soul Link

2008

- Mother Striker in Battle Spirits: Shounen Toppa Bashin

=== Original video animation (OVA) ===
1993

- Lovers Student (B) in Here Is Greenwood

1999

- Jun Kamishiro in Melty Lancer

2001

- Viola Gyunee in ZOE: 2167 IDOLO

=== Video games ===
1994

- Jun Kubota in Advanced V.G.

1996

- Orange in Fire Woman Matoi-gumi
- Fairies (G) in Walküre no Densetsu Gaiden: Rosa no Bōken

1997

- Akira Kazama in Rival Schools: United by Fate

1998

- Jun Kubota in Advanced V.G. 2

2000

- Annette in RPG Maker 2000 Sample Game
- Akira Kazama in Project Justice

2001

- Julia Douglas in Growlanser
- Viola Gune in Zone of the Enders

2003

- Viola A.I. in Anubis: Zone of the Enders

2006

- Mai Misugi in Green Green 3 ~Hello, Good-bye~

Unknown date

- Jun Kamishiro in Melty Lancer
- Yuki Yamashiro in Kojin Kyouju: La Lecon Particuliere

=== Dubbing ===
- Cordelia Chase in Buffy the Vampire Slayer and Angel
