= Baldr Sky =

Duology of Japanese adult visual novels

- Original visual novel cover of Baldr Sky "Lost Memory" Dive1
- Developer: Giga
- Publishers: JP: Giga; WW: Sekai Project
- Series: Baldr
- Platform: Windows
- Release: Dive1 "Lost Memory": JP: March 27, 2009; WW: December 20, 2019; Dive2 "Recordare": JP: November 27, 2009; WW: December 20, 2019; DiveX "Dream World": JP: September 24, 2010
- Genres: Visual novel, beat 'em up
- Mode: Single-player

Baldr Sky (バルドスカイ, Barudosukai) is a duology of Japanese adult visual novels with 2D action elements developed by Giga. The series characterizes itself as a cyberpunk action adventure game. The first game, named Baldr Sky Dive1 "Lost Memory” was released in Japan on March 27, 2009, for Windows. The second game, Baldr Sky Dive2 "Recordare" was released in Japan on November 27, 2009. A fandisc called Baldr Sky DiveX "Dream World" was released in Japan on September 24, 2010. An English version containing both Dive1 and Dive2 was released by Sekai Project on December 20, 2019.

== Gameplay ==
A majority of Baldr Sky's gameplay consists of reading the text that's rendered on screen and supported with audio for voices. The player will occasionally be presented with choices to select which may or may not determine the outcome of the game. As Baldr Sky has multiple endings, the player will have to replay the game multiple times in order to view all of the endings.

Similar to other games in the Baldr series, Baldr Sky is also driven by a top-down 2D interface where the player controls a mecha in sprite form to combat enemy machines. The player is given a chance to upgrade or modify the equipment of the mecha prior to a series of battles.

== Plot ==
=== Setting and themes ===
Baldr Sky takes place in Japan some time in the future during the 21st century. Nanomachines have become commonplace and have taken a major role in society. The abilities of these nanomachines range from medical purposes for curing ailments and modifying the taste of food. A new generation of humans now also have a chip embedded in them which allows them to be connected to the Internet at all times. With the dawn of these new technologies, warfare has expanded beyond the physical world onto the virtual world. People engage in combat online in simulacrums, the name of the mecha units in the game, or with viruses (unmanned robots).

=== Story ===
The story of Baldr Sky revolves around the male protagonist Kou Kadokura (門倉甲, Kadokura Kō) and is told through two timelines, the present and the past through flashbacks. At the beginning of the story, Kou is suffering from memory loss, so much of the back story about the past is told through flashbacks while Kou is recalling his memories with the aid of medical nanomachines. In the present, Kou and his subordinate, Rain Kirishima (桐島レイン, Kirishima Rein), are after a group of scientists who had inadvertently triggered a hazard due to leaking of a developing nanomachine. The city and the surrounding area that the lab is located in is ultimately demolished but the scientists had actually evacuated to safety from the lab before the place was destroyed. Kou wishes to uncover the truth about what happened that day and to prevent another tragedy from occurring again, as his girlfriend Sora was killed by the nanomachines.

=== Characters ===
Kou Kadokura (門倉 甲, Kadokura Kō)
Voiced by: Kazuma Yamashita

The protagonist of the story. A free mercenary and an excellent simulacrum pilot. Kou has been chasing after the truth behind the incident known as "Gray Christmas", in which he lost the person most precious to him. As he recovers his memories and experience new ones, he reaches closer to the truth.

Rain Kirishima (桐島 レイン, Kirishima Rein)
Voiced by: Honoka Imuraya

A mercenary and Kou's subordinate. Referring to Kou as Lieutenant, she becomes the one to guide the amnesiac Kou. Like a commander, she scolds and encourages Kou whenever he is in the midst of confusion at times. Even though she is polite and gentle, her gestures and expression often give people a cold impression. Rarely letting out her emotions, she often remains composed. She is merciless towards enemies. Her actions usually put Kou's safety as top priority, so much that she may even give up her own life for Kou.

Chinatsu Nagisa (渚 千夏, Nagisa Chinatsu)
Voiced by: Nao Kamiya

Kou's friend who lived with him in the Kisaragi dormitory. She disappeared after Gray Christmas, but later reappeared before then undergoing memory restoration process Kou, dressed in an army uniform and heavily cyborgized.

Nanoha Wakakusa (若草 菜ノ葉, Wakakusa Nanoha)
Voiced by: Oto Agumi

Kou's childhood friend, a year younger. She lost her parents due to a bomb. Now she is a keeper of an internet cafe.

Aki Nishino (西野 亜季, Nishino Aki)
Voiced by: Yuki Iwata

Kou's second cousin who he considers as his sister. She is a "wizard" - a genius programmer in the virtual world. Kou's simulcrum is her gift when he was moving to Kisaragi dormitory. She works in the corporation of Kou's aunt, Ark Industry.

Makoto Minazuki (水無月 真, Minazuki Makoto)
Voiced by: Hina Kamimura

Sora's little sister, she met Kou who saved her from bullying by her peers due to her illness. Later moved to Kisaragi dormitory.

Sora Minazuki (水無月 空, Minazuki Sora)
Voiced by: Sakura Hazuki

Makoto's older sister, whom she heavily adores. She died in the accident, called "Gray Christmas".

Masa Sudoh (須藤 雅, Sudō Masa)
Voiced by: Tetsuto Furukawa

Kou's best friend, who loves women and mecha. Moved with Kou in Kisaragi dormitory when they lost their previous place due to a certain incident with their upperclassmen.

Noir (ノイ, Noi)
Voiced by: Miyabi Arisugawa

A woman with a childlike appearance, and a capable underground doctor, who lives in the Suzushiro City's slums. Officially runs a sex-toy shop.

Gilberto (ジルベルト, Jiruberuto)
Voiced by: Kishō Taniyama

Leader of an illegal mercenary group "Dainsleif". Sworn enemy of Kou.

Naoki Kurihara (久利原 直樹, Kurihara Naoki)
Voiced by: Kenichi Yakushiji

Nanomachine researcher, lectoring in the Academy Seishuu.

Eiji Kadokura (門倉 永二, Kadokura Eiji)
Voiced by: Keita Nakazato

Kou's father. Member of a mercenary organization "Fenrir". Colonel.

Shizeru (シゼル, Shizeru)
Voiced by: Kumiko Okugawa

An officer mercenary from Fenrir. Major.

Mohawk (モホーク, Mohōku)
Voiced by: ZEN

An officer mercenary from Fenrir, Shizel's subordinate. Lieutenant.

Seira Tachibana (橘 聖良, Tachibana Seira)
Voiced by: Kaori Okuda

Kou's aunt, head of Ark Industry.

Father Gregory (グレゴリー神父, Guregorī Shinpu)
Voiced by: Sayu Joge

Head priest of Dominion, a group of cultists worshipping AI as their goddess.

== Music ==
The opening theme for Dive1, entitled "Restoration -Chinmoku no Sora-" (Restoration -沈黙の空-), is sung by KOTOKO. The opening theme for Dive2 is "jihad", also by KOTOKO.

== Development ==
Baldr Sky is the fifth game in the Baldr series following Baldrhead, Baldrfist, Baldr Bullet, and Baldr Force. Seiji Kikuchi, character designer for Bullet's remake, "Revellion", and Force, returned for Sky. Music composition was provided by Tgz Sounds, Barbarian on the Groove, and LittleWing.

=== Release history ===
Prior to Dive1's release, GIGA released a demo of the game's prologue chapter online on the Internet on January 23, 2009. The full game was released about two months later on March 27, 2009.

On September 24, 2010, GIGA also published a fandisc called "BALDR Sky DiveX: Dream World", which included many scenes that weren't mentioned in Dive1 and Dive2, such as the memories of Kou while he was a mercenary with Rain.

Baldr Sky "Zero", another game in the series, had been in production and released in March 2013. One of the new elements is a crossover between the Baldr Sky series and Jinki series (Jinki crossover in terms of art design).

== Reception ==
According to the sales numbers on Getchu.com, a popular Japanese games shop, March 2009 sales ranked twentieth in the following month in April.

In Getchu's user-voted rankings for games of 2009, Dive2 came in first overall, as well as first in the System, Scenario, and Music divisions, 4th in the Movie division (referring to the opening and ending animations for the game), and 10th in Graphics. Rain Kirishima and Sora Minazuki were voted the #1 and #3 characters in that year's Character division.

Dive1 was awarded the Silver Prize in the Theme Song category in 2009's Moe Game Awards. In 2010, Dive2 won the Silver Prize in the Program category and the Gold Prize in the 3D category.

In Getchu.com's 2010 game ranking, DiveX was ranked at 4th place in the System category, 8th place in the Movie category, and 18th overall.

The story is rated as one of the best visual novels of all time, both on the Japanese review site Erogamescape and on the English-speaking site vndb.
