= Kono Aozora ni Yakusoku o =

Japanese media franchise

- Cover art of the Windows game

この青空に約束を― (Kono Aozora ni Yakusoku o)
- Genre: Harem
- Video game
- Developer: Giga (Windows); TGL/Alchemist (PS2); TGL (PSP)
- Genre: Eroge, Visual novel
- Platform: Windows, PlayStation 2, PlayStation Portable, PlayStation Vita
- Released: March 31, 2006
- Manga

Kono Aozora ni Yakusoku o: Melody of the Sun and Sea
- Illustrated by: Hina Shirogane
- Published by: Kadokawa Shoten
- Magazine: Comp Ace
- Published: 2007
- Volumes: 1
- Anime television series

Kono Aozora ni Yakusoku o: Yōkoso Tsugumi Ryō e
- Directed by: Tsutomu Yabuki
- Produced by: Makoto Itō; Toshiaki Asaka; Mitsuhiro Maruyama; ichiko Koyanagi; Yūichi Matsunaga
- Written by: Satoru Nishizono
- Music by: Kenji Ito
- Studio: Artland
- Original network: Aichi Television Broadcasting
- Original run: April 3, 2007 – June 26, 2007
- Episodes: 13
- icon

Kono Aozora ni Yakusoku o (この青空に約束を, Kono Aozora ni Yakusoku o; lit. 'The Promise I Made in This Blue Sky') is a Japanese video game produced by Giga, originally released on March 31, 2006. The game was ported to the PS2 in 2007, PSP in 2009, and PS Vita in 2015. It came with additional content although the adult content was removed. An anime television series aired in 2007 under the title Kono Aozora ni Yakusoku o: Yōkoso Tsugumi Ryō e (この青空に約束を― ～ようこそつぐみ寮へ～, lit. 'The Promise I Made in This Blue Sky: Welcome to the Tsugumi Dorm'). A remake titled Kono Aozora ni Yakusoku o: Refine was released for the Nintendo Switch and PlayStation 4 on December 19, 2024.

== Gameplay ==
A scene in Kono Aozora ni Yakusoku o with all the main characters of the game.

The gameplay requires minimal interaction on the player's part as much of the time that is spent on the game is for reading the text that is displayed on the bottom of the screen. The displayed text represents either the thoughts of characters or dialogue between them. As the game progresses, decision points will appear on the screen where the player can choose which heroine or heroines they would like to talk to. Depending on what choices the player makes, the plot will progress in a certain direction. There are six different routes in total. They need to replay the game several time and make different choices to view all six of these plot lines and choices in get different endings.

The game is split into three parts, a prologue in the beginning and two others. The first part is split between two acts, spring and summer. Based on what a particular heroine feels for the protagonist, the game will proceed towards a heroine's particular route in the second part at the end of the summer.

== Plot ==
Kono Aozora ni Yakusoku o takes place on a fictional island called Minamisakōjima (南栄生島) located slightly south of Honshū in Japan. Rinna Sawaki, a student of Tsugumi Dormitory, behaves badly in the school and hates other visitors welcoming her. Wataru continues trying to welcome Rinna to the Tsugumi Dormitory. One day, he noticed that she is an excellent long-distance runner.

== Characters ==
Wataru Hoshino (星野 航, Hoshino Wataru)
Voiced by: Yuichi Nakamura (anime)
The protagonist of the story, Wataru is Umi Hayama's childhood friend. He is caring and particularly conscientious about his fellow dorm residents. Every episode begins with him reminiscing about his days in the dormitory as well as relationships with each of the girls alongside their past lives.
Rinna Sawaki (沢城 凛奈, Sawaki Rinna)
Voiced by: Haruka Kawai (Windows/PSP), Satomi Kōrogi (anime/PS2)
Rinna is a second year transfer student whom Wataru Hoshino met at Takashi's bar while he was drunk. He arrives at the marathon exhausted due to a surprise supplementary exam. Wataru competes even though Rinna offers to postpone their competition. His exhaustion catches up to him and he takes a shortcut to cross the finish line first. Although Wataru is subsequently disqualified, Rinna welcomes the excuse to join the dorm residents in another welcome party.
Umi Hayama (羽山 海己, Hayama Umi)
Voiced by: Nona Ishikawa (Windows/PSP), Fumi Morisawa (anime/PS2)
Umi is a second year student who is Wataru's childhood friend. She is good at cooking and cooks meals for evertone in the Tsugumi Dormitory. Umi had crush on Wataru ever since they were kids, but he is oblivious to it.
When Umi was a child, she was timid but disliked being alone. Umi always hung around with Wataru when they were little. She goes almost everywhere with Wataru. Some people dislike Umi and her father because her mother and Wataru's father had an intimate relationship a long time ago.
Naoko Asakura (浅倉 奈緒子, Asakura Naoko)
Voiced by: Futaba Shinozaki (Windows/PSP), Ai Orikasa (anime/PS2)
Naoko is a third year student who gets high grades and is the student council president. She is friendly and outgoing around teachers and students, but enjoys teasing the residents of Tsugumi dorm. Despite this, Naoki acts like a big sister to them.
Miyaho Rokujou (六条 宮穂, Rokujō Miyaho)
Voiced by: Junko Kusayanagi (Windows/PSP), Junko Nakata (anime/PS2)
Miyaho is the granddaughter of previous chairman of the board of directors of Takamizuka senior high school and owner of Tsugumi dorm. She is the acting chairman and temporary owner the dorm. Miyaho acts clumsy in everything she does and tends to count her steps on the stairway to their dormitory.
Shizu Fujimura (藤村 静, Fujimura Shizu)
Voiced by: Hitomi
Shizu is a student who acts bashful in front of strangers. Her parents left her and she seldom showed her feelings when Wataru first met her. Saeri stood up for her and she began to live at Tsugumi dorm and she gradually began to show her feelings. She is quiet and small, but a good athlete.
Akane Mitamura (三田村 茜, Mitamura Akane)
Voiced by: Runa Suzumiya (Windows/PSP), Kaori Nazuka (anime/PS2)
Akane is a second year student who transferred a day earlier than Rinna. She talks quickly, has sunny disposition, and is frank with her classmates. Akane often approaches Wataru, but he refuses to deal with her.
Chihiro Kudou (久藤 ちひろ, Kudō Chihiro)
Voiced by: Fūri Samoto
Chihiro is a second year student who only appears in the PSP version. She suddenly declares her love to Wataru. Although Wataru knows the names of almost everybody who lives on the island, he does not remember her name because Chihiro has a poor presence.
Saeri Kirishima (桐島 沙衣里, Kirishima Saeri)
Voiced by: Miyabi Shion (Windows/PSP), Mario (anime/PS2)
Saeri is a homeroom teacher of class 2-A who teaches Japanese language. She is also the dormitory manager, and the student council adviser. Saeri competes with Naoko even though she is a student, because Naoko is more reliable than she is.

== Development ==
The scenarios of Kono Aozora ni Yakusoku o were written by Fumiaki Maruto and Kikakuya. The art was provided by Nekonyan. Its limited edition was first released on March 31, 2006 while the regular edition followed on June 23 of the same year. It came with a soundtrack containing two discs, while pre-orders of the game came with a special drama CD. The PlayStation 2 port, Kono Aozora ni Yakusoku o: Melody of the Sun and Sea, was released on May 31, 2007. The PlayStation 2 port included additions and corrections by Kikakuya to the scenarios, changes to the CG and game system, and new short stories that are introduced after a particular route has been cleared. The PlayStation Portable port, Kono Aozora ni Yakusoku o: Te no Hira no Rakuen (この青空に約束を てのひらのらくえん), was released on June 25, 2009. The PlayStation Vita port was released on December 17, 2015. A remake, developed by Entergram under the title Kono Aozora ni Yakusoku: o Refine, was released for the Nintendo Switch and PlayStation 4 on December 19, 2024.

== Music ==
Melody of the Sun and Sea included two new theme songs. "Chiisana Brilliant" (小さなブリリアント, Chīsana Buririanto) was sung by Kaori and written by Chiyomaru Shikura and "Taiyō to Umi no Melody" (太陽と海のメロディ, Taiyō to Umi no Merodi) was sung by Ayane and composed by Narucho. The anime adaptation's opening theme, "Kono Aozora ni Yakusoku o" (この青空に約束を), was also sung by Kaori and the ending theme, "Aozora no Fantasia" (青空のファンタジア, Aozora no Fantajia), was sung by Ayumi Murata.

== Reception ==
Kono Aozora ni Yakusoku o was awarded the Bishōjo Game Award gold prize in the scenario, theme song, romance, and user approval categories in addition to the grand prize in 2006. It was also voted the 12th most interesting galge in a survey of Dengeki G's Magazine readers in August 2007.
