= Hina Kamimura =

Japanese voice actress

Hina Kamimura (神村 ひな, Kamimura Hina) is a female Japanese voice actress primarily for visual novels. She is also known as MIKAKO. She also uses her real name, Mikako Satou (佐藤 美佳子, Satou Mikako), in general games.

== Filmography ==
=== Visual novels ===
- Auau (2003), Momo
- Angelium ~Tokimeki Lovegod~ (2003), Chadoko
- Patishia na Nyanko (2003), Kanade Serizawa
- Pizzicato Polka (2003), Niko
- Yami to Bōshi to Hon no Tabibito (2003), Mau and Marieru
- Saishū Jiken Kujara (2004), Haruko Yumezen
- Sorauta (2004), China Sakura
- Ramune (2004), Suzuna Tomosaka
- Otome wa Boku ni Koishiteru (2005), Mizuho Miyanokōji and Michiko Takane
- Dyogrammaton (2005), Iryūda Wakanowa Ivanofu
- Nursery Rhyme (2005), Haruna Tachigawa
- Oshiete Re: Maid (2006), Yunisu
- Scarlett (2006), Teresa, Lucia, Suzuna, and Kanna
- Yokubari Saboten (2006), Rin Fujimiya
- Baldr Sky part 1 & 2 (2009), Makoto Minaduki
- Sei Monmusu Gakuen (2012), Mirita H Asukurepio

=== Anime ===
- Izumo (2003 OVA), Miyuki Toma
- Angelium (2004 OVA), Cyadoko Asagiri
