= Kick & Fennick =

2015 video game

- Developers: Jaywalkers Interactive; Abstraction Games
- Publisher: Green Hill
- Composer: Jonathan van den Wijngaarden
- Platforms: PlayStation Vita, Wii U, PlayStation 4, Xbox One
- Release: PlayStation Vita: NA: 3 February 2015; EU: 4 February 2015; PlayStation 4, Wii U: WW: 2 June 2016; Xbox One: WW: 3 June 2016
- Genre: Platform
- Mode: Single-player

Kick & Fennick is a platform game developed and published by Dutch studio Jaywalkers Interactive for PlayStation Vita. It was released in North America on 3 February 2015 and in Europe the following day. The game was also released free for PlayStation Plus members. On 28 January 2016, Abstraction Games announced on Twitter that they are bringing the game to Nintendo's Wii U. The two companies announced that the game will be released on the PlayStation 4, Wii U, and Xbox One in June 2016.

== Reception ==
Reception

Aggregate scores
Aggregator	Score
GameRankings	64%
Metacritic	65/100

Review score
Publication	Score
IGN	7.7/10

Kick & Fennick has received mixed reviews, holding a 64% score on GameRankings and a 65/100 on Metacritic. Writing for IGN, Tom McShea gave the game a rating of 7.7/10.
