= Giga (brand) =

Japanese video game developer

- Product type: PC games, Visual novels
- Current owner: Entergram (formerly known as TGL Planning)
- Country: Japan
- Introduced: July 9, 1993
- Discontinued: March 31, 2023

Giga (戯画) was a Japanese adult game and visual novel brand used by TGL subsidiary Entergram. The Giga brand was used on both regular visual novels as well as games that feature mecha with action-oriented gameplay elements. One of its sub-brands, Baldrhead, has been used for several of these action-oriented visual novels. Aside from their visual novels, they were known for creating the Variable Geo fighting game series for PC9800, which was later ported to TurboGrafx-CD, PC, Super Famicom, Sega Saturn and PlayStation.

Some of Giga's games have had consumer port releases onto consoles with the sexual content removed. For example, Kono Aozora ni Yakusoku o was ported to the PlayStation 2 in 2007 and the PlayStation Portable in 2009. Baldr Force was ported to the Dreamcast and PlayStation 2 and Baldr Bullet "Revellion" was ported to the PlayStation 2.

Kono Aozora ni Yakusoku o was very well received and was awarded the Bishōjo Game Award gold prize in the scenario, theme song, romance, and user approval categories in addition to the grand prize in 2006. Baldr Sky Dive1 "Lost Memories" was awarded the Moe Game Award silver prize in the theme song category in 2009.

Giga shut down and ceased selling its titles on March 31, 2023.

== Sub-Brands ==
- Armonica (defunct)
- Daisy
- Exa
- Fermi
- Nata de Koko
- Pizzicato
- RondoBell
- Sky-High
- Stripe
- TEAM BALDRHEAD (developers of the Baldr series)

== Games ==
PC-9800 series/Windows (1993-1996)

Title	Platform(s)	Release date
V.G - Variable Geo	PC-9800 series	July 9, 1993
Steam-Heart's	PC-9800 series	March 15, 1994
V.G. II - The Bout of Cabalistic Goddess	PC-9800 series	November 25, 1994
Briganty	PC-9800 series	October 27, 1995
Briganty	Windows	February 26, 1999
Harlem Blade: The Greatest of All Time	PC-9800 series	1996
Harlem Blade: The Greatest of All Time	Windows	June 11, 1999

Windows (1998–present)

Title	Release date
For Season	September 25, 1998
V.G. Custom	February 19, 1999
Baldrhead	July 2, 1999
V.G. Max	September 10, 1999
PureMind: Prelude to Harlemblade	October 29, 1999
Soukou Hime: BaldrFist	December 10, 1999
Metamorphose: Fifth Entrance of For Season	February 4, 2000
Harlem Blade II: Dark Angel	March 3, 2000
V.G. Adventure	March 17, 2000
For Season 2: Don't Forget the Changing Season	September 18, 2000
Baldr Bullet	October 27, 2000
Koisuru Oukoku	January 26, 2001
V.G. Rebirth	September 28, 2001
Petit Cherry: The Season with You	October 26, 2001
Platinum	December 7, 2001
Ripple: Welcome to Blue Seal	March 14, 2002
V.G. Rebirth Dash	March 23, 2002
Baldr Force	November 1, 2002
Aqua Blue	December 20, 2002
Colorful Kiss: 12-ko no Mune Kyun!	March 14, 2003
Chocolat: Maid Cafe "Curio"	April 4, 2003
Pastel Catchin	October 3, 2003
V.G. Neo	December 19, 2003
Colorful Heart: 12-ko no Kyururun	February 6, 2004
Moe Love: Natsuiro Moegi Ryo	February 27, 2004
Cheeseberry	August 27, 2004
Yakimochi Twin Bell	November 26, 2004
Yakitate Croissant	February 25, 2005
Parfait: Chocolat Second Brew	March 25, 2005
Duel Savior Justice	July 29, 2005
angel breath	February 24, 2006
Kono Aozora ni Yakusoku o	March 31, 2006
Baldr Bullet "Revellion"	September 29, 2006
Xross Scramble	April 27, 2007
Colorful Wish ~12ko no Majikyun!~	April 25, 2008
Sakagaari Hurricane	November 28, 2008
Fuwari Complex	February 27, 2009
Baldr Sky Dive1 "Lost Memories"	March 27, 2009
Baldr Sky Dive2 "Recordare"	November 27, 2009
Curefull!	January 29, 2010
Bitter smile.	June 25, 2010
Baldr Sky DiveX "Dream World"	September 24, 2010
Jinki Extend Re:Vision	November 26, 2010
Hinata Terrace ~We don't abandon you.~	February 25, 2011
Sucre ~sweet and charming time for you~	September 22, 2011
Hotch Kiss	February 24, 2012
Material Brave	March 23, 2012
Ano Ko wa Ore kara Hanarenai	September 28, 2012
KissBell	December 14, 2012
Material Brave Ignition	January 25, 2013
Baldr Sky "Zero"	September 27, 2013
Baldr Sky "Zero" Extreme	December 29, 2013
Kiss Art	January 31, 2014
Baldr Sky "Zero" 2	March 28, 2014
Baldr Sky "Zero" Extreme	March 28, 2014
Harvest OverRay	June 27, 2014
Passage! Passage of Life	September 26, 2014
Harvest OverRay: Reconnection	December 19, 2014
HaruKiss	January 30, 2015
Shirogane x Spirits!	March 27, 2015
Renai Phase	September 25, 2015
Amaekata wa Kanojo Nari ni	February 26, 2016
LipKiss	March 25, 2016
Baldr Heart	August 26, 2016
Baldr Heart EXE	December 22, 2016
Kimi no Hitomi ni Hit Me	January 27, 2017
FullKiss	March 24, 2017
Baldr Bringer	October 27, 2017
Soi Kano: Gyutto Dakishimete	January 26, 2018
Mell Kiss	March 23, 2018
Baldr Bringer: Extend Code	May 25, 2018
love clear	January 25, 2019
Ao Natsu Line	March 29, 2019
