= Pulltop =

Japanese video game company

PULLTOP
- Product type: PC games, Visual novels
- Current owner: WillPlus
- Country: Japan
- Introduced: June 28, 2002
- Website: pulltop.com

PULLTOP (プルトップ, Purutoppu) is a Japanese adult visual novel brand name used by WillPlus. They're known for fantasy games such as Princess Waltz, Lovekami and Miagete Goran, Yozora no Hoshi o. They also have a sub-brand called Pulltop Latte.

== Notable games ==
- Trouble Captor! - 2002
- Natsu Shoujo - 2003
- Onegai O-Hoshi-sama - 2004
- Yunohana - 2005
- Princess Waltz - 2006
- Haruka ni Aogi, Uruwashi no - 2006
- Te to Te Try on! - 2008
- Shirokuma Bell Stars♪ - 2009
- Lovekami - 2010
- Shinsei ni Shite Okasubekarazu - 2011
- Kono Oozora ni, Tsubasa wo Hirogete - 2012
- Kanojo to Ore to Koibito to. - 2012
- Kono Oozora ni, Tsubasa wo Hirogete FLIGHT DIARY - 2013
- Kokoro@Fankushon! - 2013
- Koisuru Natsu no Rasutorizōto - 2014
- Koisuru natsu no Rasutorizōto Sweetest Summer - 2014
- Kono Oozora ni, Tsubasa wo Hirogete SNOW PRESENTS - 2014
- Kokoro@Fankushon! NEO (Network Enhanted Operation) - 2014
- Mirai Kanojo - 2015
- Natsu-iro Reshipi - 2015
- Miagete Goran, Yozora no Hoshi o - 2015
- Miagete Goran, Yozora no Hoshi o FINE DAYS - 2016
- Yakimochi Kanojo no Ichizu na Koi - 2016
- LoveKami -Sweet Stars- - 2017
- Office de Sasou Ecchi na Kanojo - 2017
- Pure Song Garden! - 2017
- LoveKami -Trouble Goddess- - 2017
- Sora to Umi ga, Fureau Kanata -2018
- Miagete Goran, Yozora no Hoshi o: Interstellar Focus - 2018
- Sakura Iro, Mau Koro ni - 2019
- LoveKami -Healing Harem- - TBA
