= Takahiro Kimura =

Japanese illustrator (1964–2023)

- Born: May 19, 1964; Fukuoka Prefecture, Japan
- Died: March 5, 2023 (aged 58)
- Other name: Araji Sugawara
- Occupations: Animator; Illustrator; Character designer
- Known for: Variable Geo; The King of Braves GaoGaiGar; Betterman; Code Geass

Takahiro Kimura (木村 貴宏, Kimura Takahiro; May 19, 1964 – March 5, 2023) was a Japanese animator, illustrator and character designer. He died of amyloidosis on March 5, 2023.

== Works ==
- City Hunter 3 (Key animation)
- Idol Tenshi Yokoso Yōko (Key animation)
- Dirty Pair Flash (Character design, animation director)
- Mobile Fighter G Gundam (Chief animation director)
- The King of Braves GaoGaiGar (Character designs and chief animation director)
- Betterman (Character designs and chief animation director)
- Variable Geo (Character designs)
- Steam-Heart's (Character designs)
- Usagi-chan de Cue!! (Character designs)
- Brigadoon: Marin & Melan (Character designs and chief animation director)
- Kiddy Grade (Eyecatch illustrator – episode 4)
- Shinkon Gattai Godannar!! (Character designs and chief animation director)
- Mobile Suit Gundam SEED (Eyecatch illustrator)
- Superior Defender Gundam Force (Character designs)
- Mobile Suit Gundam SEED DESTINY (Eyecatch illustrator)
- Gun Sword (Character designs and chief animation director)
- Blood+ (Key animation)
- Code Geass (Character designs and chief animation director)
- Dororon Enma-kun Meeramera (Character designs and chief animation director)
- Xenoblade Chronicles 2 (Guest character design - Perun)
