= Variable Geo =

Japanese 2D fighting game/eroge series

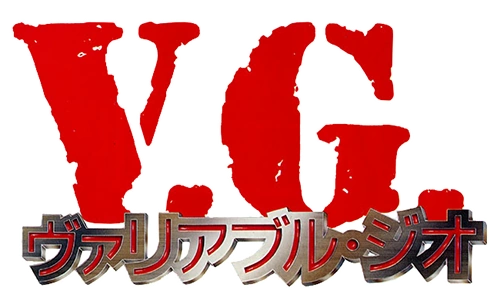

ヴァリアブル・ジオ (Variaburu Jio)
- Genre: Action, Family saga
- Video game
- Developer: Giga (home computers); TGL (consoles)
- Publisher: Giga (home computers); TGL (consoles)
- Genre: Fighting game, bishōjo
- Platform: PC-98, PC Engine CD-ROM² System, Super Famicom, PlayStation, Saturn, Windows
- Released: July 9, 1993 (PC-98); July 22, 1994 (TurboGrafx-16); July 21, 1995 (SNES); April 19, 1996 (PlayStation); March 14, 1997 (Saturn); February 19, 1999 (Windows)
- Original video animation
- Directed by: Tooru Yoshida
- Produced by: Masato Ebina; Ayumi Enomoto
- Written by: Yōsuke Kuroda
- Music by: Harukichi Yamamoto
- Studio: Chaos Project
- Licensed by: NA: ADV Films
- Released: January 29, 1997 – June 27, 1997
- Runtime: 30 minutes (each)
- Episodes: 3
- Original video animation

Variable Geo Neo
- Directed by: Ryuuichi Nozaki
- Written by: Michiko Hattori
- Studio: Jam Studio; Studio Lagoon
- Released: February 25, 2004 – January 25, 2005
- Runtime: 30 minutes (each)
- Episodes: 3

Variable Geo (ヴァリアブル・ジオ, Variaburu Jio), also known as V.G., is a Japanese 2D fighting game and eroge series developed and published by TGL for consoles and under their Giga brand for home computers. The series focuses on an all-female martial arts competition where participants are required to promote various family restaurants by acting as waitresses when not fighting. The original Variable Geo was released in 1993 for PC-9801; after this first game, the series continued on home computers as an adult-oriented eroge including visual novel spin-offs, while a separate rebooted sub-series was made for consoles called Advanced V.G. with a story mode and toned down (or removed) explicit content, more akin to a regular 2D fighter. The Advanced line had three titles, the last being Advanced V.G. 2 on PlayStation in 1998, while the main line continued until 2004's V.G. NEO. Alongside the video games, OVA adaptations were also made based on the Variable Geo series.

== Plot ==
Front cover of V.G.: Variable Geo for the PC-9801, the first title of the series.

Set in a near-future version of Japan, the games tell the story of a martial arts tournament created to determine the country's strongest woman. The tournaments are sponsored by a number of family restaurants, who in exchange for their sponsorship, are given promotion in the form of having a tournament entry work as a waitress. As a result of the popularity of the tournaments, the restaurants experience a boom in patronage.

The winner of the tournament is awarded the title "Virgin Goddess", as well as a large cash prize of ten billion yen, and a house erected anywhere on the planet she should choose. However, when a given waitress is defeated, she will be forced to publicly strip herself of her own clothing (self-fondling and public masturbation may be forced upon the loser, and in the most extreme cases, the loser is raped/gang-raped, either in private or in front of an audience), in order to teach the so-called "true" shame of defeat. In spite of such humiliation, the tournaments often draw many competitors, each placing her pride and her dreams on the line as she battles for the top.

== Characters ==
Takahiro Kimura was responsible for designing the characters in V.G. and V.G. II.

- Yuka Takeuchi (武内 優香, Takeuchi Yuka)

Voiced by: Mika Moriwaki (V.G./II), Yukana (Advanced V.G./2, Super V.G.), Kotono Mitsuishi (V.G. OVA), Ruru (V.G. Neo), Suzune Kusunoki (V.G. Neo OVA) (Japanese); Edi Patterson (V.G. OVA) (English)
A practitioner of karate who resides in Tokyo. After her parents died when she was young, her grandfather took her in and trained her in the martial arts, including Karate and the manipulation of ki (life-energy). She enters the VG tournaments simply for the purpose of furthering her training and testing herself against strong opponents. Her virtuous, outgoing personality wins her many friends among the other fighters, among whom are Chiho Masuda, Jun Kubota, and Satomi Yajima, the latter of whom she has been best friends with for years. Apart from the main series, Yuka also appears in V.G. Neo as "Misty" and in Giga's crossover game Otome Crisis.

- Chiho Masuda (増田 千穂, Masuda Chiho)

Voiced by: Maki Uehara (V.G./II), Hekiru Shiina (Advanced V.G. (PCE/PS), Super V.G.), Yōko Asada (Advanced V.G. (SS)/2), Junko Iwao (V.G. OVA) (Japanese); Jessica Robertson (V.G. OVA) (English)
A trained ninja and was once the heir apparent to her family's ninja clan. However, she desires a life of freedom and happiness and thus has run away, becoming a "Missing-nin." She participates in hopes of using the prize money and free real estate to finance her new life.

- Jun Kubota (久保田 潤, Kubota Jun)

Voiced by: Sachie Mieno (V.G./II), Chiharu Tezuka (Advanced V.G./2, Super V.G.), Ai Orikasa (V.G. OVA) (Japanese); Kathryn Feller (V.G. OVA) (English)
A wrestler with vast amounts of strength, Jun once participated in the Olympics while in high school. However, she was ejected from the games due to repeated unsportsmanlike conduct. She later joins the V.G. competitions because she can treat her opponents as roughly as she pleases. Despite this however, Jun operates by her own personal honor code. She fiercely believes that the use of weaponry in an unarmed bout is unacceptable.

- Manami Kusunoki (楠 真奈美, Kusunoki Manami)

Voiced by: Yumiko Ogawa (V.G./II), Kae Araki (Advanced V.G./2, Super V.G.), Ikue Ōtani (V.G. OVA) (Japanese); Larissa Wolcott (V.G. OVA) (English)
The youngest competitor in the VG Tournament at age 16. Along with her relative youth, she is also woefully immature, often acting like a girl half her age. Despite this however, she is a surprisingly clever and capable fighter, incorporating the natural energeticness of a child, as well her own vivid imagination into her fighting style. Her reason for entering the competitions is solely to obtain the large cash prize awarded to the winner. She is often the most lighthearted competitor in any given tournament, treating the fights as if they were all a big game.

- Kaori Yanase (梁瀬 かおり, Yanase Kaori)

Voiced by: Naruchan (V.G./II), Yuri Shiratori (Advanced V.G./2, Super V.G.), Yuka Imai (V.G. OVA) (Japanese); Katherine Catmull (V.G. OVA) (English)
A 19-year old computer technician schooled in the art of taekwondo. She initially entered the V.G. tournament to test her own abilities, but found herself humiliated in the final round by Reimi Jahana. Ever since, she has devoted her training to defeating the multi-time V.G. champion. Despite this, Kaori apparently bears no ill will towards her would-be rival and simply sees defeating her as part of the path she must travel to become stronger.

- Reimi Jahana (レイミ・謝花, Reimi Jahana)

Voiced by: Chikako Imai (V.G./II), Kumiko Watanabe (Advanced V.G./2, Super V.G.), Yuriko Yamaguchi (V.G. OVA) (Japanese); Lane West (V.G. OVA) (English) is
The head of the Jahana Group, the organization which supervises the V.G. tournaments. Reimi is wealthy, highly intelligent, and extremely beautiful. She is also a skilled martial artist and a three-time V.G. champion. Reimi initially sees the competitions as a chance to prove herself the strongest and most beautiful warrior of all, and takes a kind of perverse pleasure in watching those who lose against her be humiliated in various ways. After being defeated by Yuka, she reforms and re-enters the tournament with the hopes of regaining her title.

- Yumiko Watanuki (綿貫 弓子, Watanuki Yumiko)

Voiced by: Akiko Iwato
The first of Kotoe's bodyguards who specializes in Chinese martial arts. She would later reappear as a playable character in V.G. Max. She is first introduced in V.G. II: Bout of Cabalistic Goddess.

- Satomi Yajima (八島 聡美, Yajima Satomi)

Voiced by: Chisa Yokoyama (Advanced V.G./2, Super V.G.), Yuko Ohike (V.G. II), Yūko Miyamura (V.G. OVA) (Japanese); Amber Allison (V.G. OVA) (English)
A young woman who lives with her younger brother, Daisuke. Their parents died when they were young. She earns money for living expenses and school tuition by working part-time jobs while caring for Daisuke. While she is an honest, straightforward person, she is also practical and realistic when it comes to situations involving money. This is because they have no other living relatives to provide for them, Satomi is often forced to take various odd jobs simply in order to make ends meet.

- Ayako Yuuki (結城 綾子, Yūki Ayako)

Voiced by: Yuri Amano (Advanced V.G./2, Super V.G.), Noriko Azuma (V.G. II), Michiko Neya (V.G. OVA) (Japanese); Sascha Biesi (V.G. OVA) (English)
The star attraction of the SoTO, a Women only techno/rave dance club and restaurant, where she dazzles visitors with her flashy dancing. While appearing on the surface to be nothing more than a good-looking "Party girl", Ayako spends a great deal of her free time providing volunteer services to the needy and homeless. She also makes a pastime of luring out rapists, muggers, and stalkers and then beating them to within an inch of their lives, because they do unjust things to women. She is openly lesbian, in the OVA she is portrayed as being attracted to Satomi.

- Erina Goldsmith (エリナ・ゴールドスミス, Erina Gorudosumissu)

Voiced by: Miyuki Matsushita (Advanced V.G./2, Super V.G.), Yumiko Ogawa (V.G. II), Yūko Nagashima (V.G. OVA), Kai Osaka (V.G. Rebirth) (Japanese); Dara Aylor (V.G. OVA) (English)
Also known as Elirin, is a full-blooded American born and raised in Osaka. She is loud, outspoken, and fond of bawdy humor. She owns and operates her own restaurant, The Rival, and fights in the V.G. tournaments in hopes of bringing her paternal grandmother from the United States to live with her in Japan. Erina practices no particular martial art, but instead fights using improvised methods derived from years of street brawling which she took up to vent her anger at her treatment by others due to a kind of prejudice commonly shown by Japanese towards foreigners.

- Tamao Mitsurugi (御剣 珠緒, Mitsurugi Tamao)

A young girl who dreams of one day being like her idol, Yuka Takeuchi. To that end, she has tirelessly spent her spare time practicing amateur Karate and attempting to copy Yuka's various techniques. She somehow gained the ability to control her energy before her fourteenth birthday. Much like Yuka, Tamao is hard working, honest, and generally outgoing, which allows her to make friends easily. However, she is clumsy, forgetful, and tends to act before thinking things through.

- Kyouko Kirishima (霧島 恭子, Kirishima Kyōko)

A member of one of the Masuda clan's branch families and Chiho's distant cousin. She is sent to compete under orders to either force Chiho back into the clan or kill her.

== Media ==
=== Games ===
List of games
Game	Details
V.G. - Variable Geo Original release date: JP: July 9, 1993	Release years by system: 1993 – PC-9800 series
V.G. - Variable Geo Original release date: JP: July 9, 1993	Notes: Published by Giga; The first game in the series largely ignored a major storyline in favor of focusing more on the fighting system and hentai sequences. Players take control of one of six V.G. waitresses and battle the other five in order to win the tournament. Kaori Yanase and Reimi Jahana serve as the game's sub and final boss characters respectively unless the player is controlling one of them, in which case Yuka takes the place of the player-controlled character.
Advanced V.G. Original release date: JP: July 22, 1994	Release years by system: 1994 – PC Engine CD-ROM²; 1996 – PlayStation; 1997 – Sega Saturn; 2009 – PlayStation Network – 2025 Nintendo Switch, PlayStation 5, Steam (service)
Advanced V.G. Original release date: JP: July 22, 1994	Notes: Published by TGL. (Note: The SuperLite 1500 budget re-release versions of the PlayStation version of Advanced V.G. and Advanced V.G. 2 was published by Success Corporation, while the PSone Classics version was published by Entergram, the current name of TGL's video game division.); An updated version of the first game with a story mode and which adds three new playable characters (Satomi Yajima, Ayako Yuuki, and Erina Goldsmith), a storyline which features Yuka as the main character (who has a clone), and includes a pair of "True" bosses, the genetically engineered "Hybrid" warriors K-1 and K-2.; This game would later be re-released on the Sega Saturn and PlayStation with updated graphics and sound. The Sega Saturn version includes the "Graphic Mode" setting which allows the viewing of erotic scenes after a match, although with nudity removed.
V.G. II - THE BOUT OF CABALISTIC GODDESS Original release date: JP: November 25, 1994	Release years by system: 1994 – PC-9800 series
V.G. II - THE BOUT OF CABALISTIC GODDESS Original release date: JP: November 25, 1994	Notes: Published by Giga.; Kotoe Kashima, a childhood rival of Reimi, creates her own V.G. tournament in order to prove once and for all that she is far stronger and more beautiful than the Jahana Heiress. All of the previous fighters return and must face each other through a series of bouts. After defeating the other characters, the player must then face Kotoe's bodyguards before fighting Kotoe herself in a final match. This game was later declared non-canon by TGL.; A balance update called V.G. II.1 was included in the Variable Geo Perfect Collection compilation.; One new character introduced: Yumiko Watanuki.
Super Variable Geo Original release date: JP: July 21, 1995	Release years by system: 1995 – Super Famicom
Super Variable Geo Original release date: JP: July 21, 1995	Notes: Published by TGL.; A stripped-down version of Advanced V.G. that removes the Yuka clone, the Hybrids and the Story Mode.
Advanced V.G. 2 Original release date: JP: September 23, 1998	Release years by system: 1998 – PlayStation; 2009 – PlayStation Network
Advanced V.G. 2 Original release date: JP: September 23, 1998	Notes: Published by TGL.; The sequel to Advanced V.G. centers around a plot-driven "Story Mode" which features new protagonist Tamao Mitsurugi facing all of the previous competitors, as well as new faces Kyoko Kirishima and Saki Shinjou before going on to face the new boss characters Material and Miranda Jahana, Reimi's mother.; The game (along with the PlayStation edition of the first Advanced V.G.) was re-released as part of Success Corporation's SuperLite 1500 line in 2003 and on the PlayStation Network as part of the PSone Classics program (in Japan only) in 2009.; New characters: Tamao Mitsurugi, Saki Shinjou, and Kyouko Kirishima.
V.G. Custom Original release date: JP: February 19, 1999	Release years by system: 1999 – Microsoft Windows
V.G. Custom Original release date: JP: February 19, 1999	Notes: Published by Giga.; Another remake of Advanced V.G., this game features the same cast as Super Variable Geo, but includes the same style of graphics and sound used in Advanced V.G. 2, along with reusing all Humiliation sequences from V.G. II (though the dialogue was changed) and (non-canon) endings. *Tamao Mitsurugi is a hidden character in the game and playable in versus and practice modes once unlocked.
V.G. Max Original release date: JP: September 10, 1999	Release years by system: 1999 – Microsoft Windows
V.G. Max Original release date: JP: September 10, 1999	Notes: A game in which the V.G. waitresses are rendered as super deformed style characters akin to Pocket Fighter.; Includes the original six V.G. contestants, as well as Satomi Yajima from Advanced V.G., Tamao Mitsurugi from Advanced V.G. 2, Yumiko Watanuki from V.G. II and new character Masako Houjouin.; In what turned out to be the final fighting game in the series, it uses two attack buttons instead of four like in the other games.
V.G. Adventure Original release date: JP: March 17, 2000	Release years by system: 2000 – Microsoft Windows
V.G. Adventure Original release date: JP: March 17, 2000	Notes: A text-based adventure game featuring the V.G. waitresses. The player takes control of Tamao Mitsurugi as she attempts to locate the missing Yuka Takeuchi and foil Miranda's latest plot. Fights are executed in a rock-paper-scissors fashion. With each successful attack, energy is added to a super meter that appears under the fighter's lifebar. Once full, the fighter can unleash a powerfully (in most characters' cases) unblockable attack.; While Tamao is the only playable character in the story mode, there is a CPU versus mode that allows the player to pick from any character in the game.
V.G. Rebirth Original release date: JP: September 28, 2001	Release years by system: 2001 – Microsoft Windows
V.G. Rebirth Original release date: JP: September 28, 2001	Notes: A visual novel game in which the player plays the part of a reporter working on a story about the V.G. competition. The game also introduces the new character Hiyori Sakuragi. Depending on the choices the player makes, he/she will be paired with Yuka, Tamao or Reimi.
V.G. Rebirth Dash Original release date: JP: March 23, 2002	Release years by system: 2002 – Microsoft Windows
V.G. Rebirth Dash Original release date: JP: March 23, 2002	Notes: An update to V.G. Rebirth which includes nearly every other non-boss character (Ayako Yuuki is absent as she is a lesbian) as an option to pair with the player. It also introduces the new character Keiko Hatano.
V.G. NEO Original release date: JP: December 19, 2003	Release years by system: 2003 – Microsoft Windows
V.G. NEO Original release date: JP: December 19, 2003	Notes: The last visual novel returns the series to its roots as a fighting tournament and features an entirely new cast other than Yuka (in a supporting role). The game received an OVA adaptation in 2004 titled V.G. Neo: The Animation.

=== Anime ===
There is a three-part anime OVA series based on the games. Published by KSS, the OVA loosely follows the same plot as Advanced V.G., although with several changes: Miranda is dead and her spirit is seeking a new host body, the Hybrids do not exist, and the matches are ranked at different "levels" (Levels 1–5, with the implication that the penalties for losing differ, depending on the level of a given match), among other things. The Japanese voice actors for every character were also changed for this series.

The first chapter of the OVA was released on November 29, 1996, with the second chapter was released on March 14, 1997 and the last chapter on June 27, 1997. In 1998 ADV Films released the animation subtitled and dubbed on VHS, and later re-released in 2003 on DVD, as part of the celebration of the series' tenth anniversary.

In 2004, a new OVA series was released called V.G. NEO (released in English by Critical Mass as Variable Geo Neo), animated by Milky Studios, based on the 2003 visual novel of the same name, with new characters but with the same storyline and in the same V.G. universe. Unlike the previous OVA, V.G. NEO contains sexually explicit content in line with the computer-based entries of the game series.

As the Variable Geo video games were never released outside Japan, both OVAs are the only Variable Geo media to be released in English until 2025 with Advanced V.G. Saturn Tribute’s Nintendo Switch and Steam versions.

== Gameplay ==
Gameplay of Advanced V.G. 2 on PlayStation

Gameplay in the Variable Geo fighting games utilizes a four-button layout (two-button layout in V.G. MAX), with two buttons each for punches and kicks of differing strength and speed. Special moves are initiated by keying in various movements using the control pad or joystick and punctuated with the press of one of the punch or kick buttons.

Later games would add a special meter (identical to the system that was standardized by Super Street Fighter II Turbo) that would fill as the player inflicts or receives damage. Filling the bar would result in a stock of "Energy" being acquired, which could either be used for one of a number of enhanced super special attacks, or saved for later use in the match. Some moves also require more than one Special Stock to be acquired before being able to use them.

Both characters begin any given fight with a full health bar that is depleted as they take damage from attacks. The first character to have her health completely depleted is the loser. In a single player game, defeating a CPU-controlled character yields a reward, showcasing the defeated character in an imaginary situation where she is either forced to commit an embarrassing (usually sexual) act in public or private, or is raped by an unseen assailant or assailants. This feature is present only in the PC-98 and Windows PC titles, as well in the Sega Saturn version of Advanced V.G. (although toned down compared to the computer versions) and can be switched off in the games' settings menu.

== Reception ==
Writing in Viz Media's online magazine, J-pop, Ted Thomas reviewed Advanced V.G. and recommended that the game is not worth importing. Another review from the same publication for the first OVA noted that the series includes various lesbian characters, along with themes about "DNA manipulation, demonic possession, mind control, and body altering drugs." The review also said that the animation is sparse and said that while they enjoyed the series, it is "full of all the guilty pleasures only anime can provide."

Saturn Fan magazine in Japan gave Advanced V.G. a score of 4.4 out of 10.

Advanced V.G. 2 in particular have received competitive support from the fighting game community, being featured at Evo Japan 2020.
