= If My Heart Had Wings (video game) =

2012 video game

- Developer: Pulltop (Note: Cruise Sign for PlayStation 3 and PlayStation Vita developed by Regista and 5pb. Games.)
- Publishers: JP: Pulltop; JP: Mages. (PS3, Vita); WW: MoeNovel
- Platforms: Microsoft Windows; Android; iOS; PlayStation 3; PlayStation Vita; Nintendo Switch
- Release: Windows: JP: May 25, 2012; WW: June 28, 2013; Android, iOS: NA: June 12, 2014; PlayStation 3, PS Vita: JP: March 31, 2016; Nintendo Switch: WW: September 5, 2019
- Genre: Visual novel
- Mode: Single-player

If My Heart Had Wings (Note: Known in Japan as Kono Ōzora ni, Tsubasa o Hirogete (この大空に、翼をひろげて) transl. Spread your wings in this wide open sky) is a romance visual novel video game developed by Pulltop written by Asuta Konno who also wrote Atri: My Dear Moments. It was released in Japan in 2012, and internationally by MoeNovel in 2013 with the sexual content removed.

== Plot ==
Having lost his direction in life, Aoi returns to his hometown of Kazegaura. With his childhood friend Ageha, super-repeat student Amane, and wheelchair-using Kotori, they restore the school gliding club.

The central themes of the story are loss and the overcoming of limits, both physical and emotional.

== Characters ==
=== Main characters ===
Aoi Minase (水瀬 碧, Minase Aoi)
Voiced by: Yotsuya Cider (drama CD only)
Aoi Minase is the main protagonist. Following a cycling accident, he moves back to his home town of Kazegaura, where his mother has arranged for him to become the manager of Flying Fish Manor, a girls' dormitory.

Kotori Habane (羽々音 小鳥, Habane Kotori)
Voiced by: Hoshizaki Iria
Kotori is the main heroine of the visual novel. She has long, dark hair, and is considered to be beautiful, despite her somewhat childish personality. Following an accident that left her paralysed from the waist down, she transferred to Keifuu Academy. At the beginning of the story, she is on the verge of quitting school.

Ageha Himegi (姫城 あげは, Himegi Ageha)
Voiced by: Moka Choko
Aoi's childhood friend, Ageha is very popular amongst the students of Keifuu Academy. She is a member of the Robotics Club.

Amane Mochizuki (望月 天音, Mochizuki Amane)
Voiced by: Gogyou Nazuna
Amane, known as the "super repeat student", is revered as a genius by Keifuu Academy's students. At the start of the story, she is the sole member of the Soaring Club. Despite her intelligence, she is very clumsy and sometimes lacks common sense.

Asa Kazato (風戸 亜紗, Kazato Asa)
Voiced by: Yukito Saori
Asa is Yoru's elder twin sister, and a first-year at Keifuu Academy. She is bright and eager to learn about the process of building and flying gliders.

Yoru Kazato (風戸 依瑠, Kazato Yoru)
Voiced by: Arisugawa Miyabi
Yoru is Asa's younger twin sister. Unlike Asa, she shows no interest in gliders, and comes across as somewhat aloof.

=== Supporting characters ===
Tatsuya Igarasashi (五十嵐 達也, Igarasashi Tatsuya)
Voiced by: Kojirou
Tatsuya is around the same age as Amane and Hibari, and is friends with Aoi, Masatsugu and the Himegi family. He works at his family's factory, and helps the Soaring Club procure parts for their glider.

Masatsugu Tasaki (田崎 柾次, Tasaki Masatsugu)
Voiced by: Aoi Yuuma
Nicknamed Ma-bou by his childhood friends, Masatsugu is very enegetic and attached to his friends. After breaking up with his former girlfriend, he begins to take an interest in Akari.

Hibari Habane (羽々音 ひばり, Habane Hibari)
Voiced by: Soyogi Tōno
Hibari is Kotori's older sister. She is gentle and cares deeply for her sister, however she can be quite forceful at times. She is opposed to the idea of Kotori flying a glider, as she thinks it would be too dangerous.

Hotaru Himegi (姫城 ほたる, Himegi Hotaru)
Voiced by: Hatori Sora
Hotaru is the younger of the two Himegi sisters. Compared to Ageha, she is much more quiet and reserved. She acts especially shy around Aoi.

Akari Kumoi (雲居 朱莉, Kumoi Akari)
Voiced by: Kisaragi Aoi
Akari is the strict yet fair vice president of the Keifuu Academy student council. She is often the breaker of bad news when it comes to the Soaring Club, but she secretly roots for its success.

Kanako Shigure (時雨 佳奈子, Shigure Kanako)
Voiced by: Yuuki Serika
Kanako is a resident of Flying Fish Manor, and Aoi's senior. She often walks around the dormitory wearing nothing but her underwear, and often teases Aoi and the other residents.

Isuka Misagi (美鷺 イスカ, Misagi Isuka)
Voiced by: Kasuga Rika
Isuka is Amane Mochizuki's best friend. She was the one who originally proposed the idea of flying over the Morning Glory, but she never managed to do so due to an accident.

Kujira Tobioka (飛岡 鯨, Tobioka Kujira)
Voiced by: Jimu Kyarii
A teacher at Keifuu Academy, and the adviser to the Robotics Club. He is extremely strict, and seems determined to stop the Soaring Club from continuing its activities.

Hat (ハット, Hatto)
Voiced by: Chatani Yasura
A duck who lives at Flying Fish Manor. As he has been there longer than anyone else, the residents of the dormitory refer to him as senpai.

== Release ==
Pulltop officially released an adult trial version on 6 April 2012 followed by the full, limited-edition version released on 25 May 2012. The visual novel received its English release on 28 June 2013, with its age rating lowered to "all-ages": all sexual content was cut or edited. This version of the game was released on Steam, and also Nintendo Switch on September 5, 2019.

=== Fan disc ===
A fan disc, entitled If My Heart Had Wings -Flight Diary- (Note: Known in Japan as Kono Ōzora ni, Tsubasa o Hirogete Flight Diary (この大空に、翼をひろげて Flight Diary)) was released on 25 January 2013, featuring a collection of additional stories: both a prologue and an epilogue to the main story are included, and Kotori, Kanako and Hotaru received individual side stories. Furthermore, there are two additional routes for the Himegi sisters and the Kazato twins respectively. On 31 March 2016, Pulltop released Cruise Sign, a collection including both If My Heart Had Wings and Flight Diary, as well as an additional scenario for Akari Kumoi.

MoeNovel released an all-ages international version of Flight Diary on 27 February 2019. This version, as with If My Heart Had Wings, replaces all 18+ content with alternative scenes, or cuts them entirely. This release omits the Himegi sisters scenario, by virtue of it being composed almost entirely of erotic content. On 23 April of the same year, Akari's scenario was released as downloadable content for Flight Diary under the title New Wings: Akari.

=== Music ===
The opening theme for the visual novel is "Precious Wing" by Chata and the ending song is "Perfect Sky" by Haruka Shimotsuki. In its soundtrack, there are 29 songs in total.

== Reception ==
If My Heart Had Wings achieved an OpenCritic rating of Strong.

Kotaku praised the game's story, as well as the background art and sprite design, but criticised its use of 3D models.
