= Little Red Lie =

2017 adventure video game

- Developer: Will O'Neill
- Publisher: Will O'Neill
- Platforms: macOS; Windows; Android; iOS; PlayStation 4; PlayStation Vita
- Release: macOS, Windows; July 7, 2017; Android, iOS; August 19, 2017; PlayStation 4, Vita; January 9, 2018
- Genre: Adventure
- Mode: Single-player

Little Red Lie is an adventure game developed by Will O'Neill, released on July 7, 2017, for Windows and macOS on the Steam platform, and later released for iOS, Android, PlayStation 4, and PlayStation Vita.

It received positive reception from critics due to its exploration of the nature of modern poverty.

== Gameplay ==
Little Red Lie plays in the manner of a 2D, top-down RPG, although the game's sole means of interaction is to lie to others. Through knowing the best times to lie, players can "reshape" the lives of the characters they are playing as. These two characters are a middle-class woman struggling to get by, and a happy, rich and powerful man looking to accumulate even more wealth.

== Plot ==
The game revolves around the systems perpetuating the "feeling of hopelessness" in modern capitalism after the 2008 financial crisis, as well as economic inequality. One of the two main characters, Sarah, is a 38-year-old who believed that her job prospects would be secure upon graduating from college, but was instead forced to live with her parents while contending with "stagnant wages" and "insecure employment". The second protagonist is Arthur Fox, a wealthy, charismatic financial guru, and motivational speaker, who lies in order to make even more money, and was inspired in part by Rob Ford and Donald Trump. Their two stories run parallel to each other and deal with their common struggles to avoid falling into poverty, with Sarah largely being a victim of circumstances beyond her control, and Arthur, a "human black hole", bringing pain and misery to himself and everyone around him largely due to his own greed and sociopathy.

== Development ==
The developer of the game, Will O'Neill, also developed Actual Sunlight, an "unflinching" exploration of depression. He is a fan of narrative interactive storytelling, and set the game in Scarborough, his hometown. He stated that he developed the game out of passion and that it was unlikely to pay his bills, due to a "broken" system for indie games that made it difficult for them to stand out. He also stated that there was no community for "realistic, contemporary dramatic fiction", making the game even harder to market.

O'Neill believes that most Millennials do their best to hide the modern realities of income inequality, such as being forced to live with their parents. He believes that Millennials make "less and less money every year", and people must "face" this "rock-bottom social and political reality" in order to prevent "the richest and the worst" from taking advantage of them. However, the game is nihilistic, and ultimately accepts that Americans will not make as much money as they did in the 20th century.

== Reception ==
Little Red Lie received "generally favorable" reviews according to review aggregator website Metacritic. Jess Joho of Mashable called it an "important" vision that "couldn't have more relevance" to the middle class who is affected by financial inequality. Joe Donnelly of PC Gamer called it a "brilliantly thoughtful adventure" and praised it as "stellar".
