= Jungle Rumble =

2014 video game

- Developer: Disco Pixel
- Publisher: Disco Pixel
- Designer: Trevor Stricker
- Artist: Luigi Guatieri
- Composer: Richard Gould
- Engine: Unity
- Platforms: iOS, Android, PlayStation Vita
- Release: iOS, Android: WW: April 30, 2014; PlayStation Vita: WW: February 10, 2015
- Genres: Rhythm, real-time strategy, puzzle

Jungle Rumble: Freedom, Happiness, and Bananas is a 2014 indie game developed and published by American indie studio Disco Pixel. The game is a crossover between a rhythm game and a real-time strategy game in which the player drums on a mobile screen to control a tribe of monkeys.

== Gameplay ==
The game is played on a mobile device held vertically. The player drums on monkeys to control them, with different patterns for moving and attacking. Consistently moving builds "mojo" which increases the player's power. Enemy monkeys attack and the player must strategize to avoid being overrun.

The pattern tapped on the screen specifies the action and the objects tapped on specify what performs the action. The player continuously drums on things in the jungle in order to play the game. Designer Trevor Stricker has called this a "Rhythmic Grammar".

== Reception ==
Reception

Aggregate score
Aggregator	Score
Metacritic	iOS: 76/100; VITA: 56/100

Review scores
Publication	Score
148Apps	4/5
Indie Gems	4.5/5
Apple'N'Apps	9/10
Gaming Age	90%

The game has been praised for pushing the breadth and scope of rhythm games. Chief comparisons have been to Patapon and Rhythm Heaven. It has been criticized for difficulty. The game received generally positive reviews. 148 Apps praised the "goofy concept" in a 4/5 review. Apple'N'Apps cited the "unique experience" in a 9/10 review. Indie Gems called it an interesting mix of rhythm and RTS in a 9/10 review.
