= Baldr Force =

2002 video game

- Developer: GIGA (Team Baldrhead)
- Publishers: GIGA (Giga brand) (Win); Alchemist (DC, PS2); GIGA (TGL brand) (Win SE)
- Platforms: Dreamcast, Windows, PlayStation 2
- Release: Baldr Force; November 1, 2002 (Win); Baldr Force EXE; January 24, 2003 (Win); October 28, 2004 (DC); April 7, 2005 (PS2); Baldr Force "Standard Edition"; March 23, 2007 (Win)
- Genres: action, adventure
- Mode: Single-player

Baldr Force is a 2D action-shooter game and eroge visual novel with action and detailed sprite characters. The game features a world in the not-so-distant future where humans are able to dive into the network, and fight using humanoid tools called "Simulacrum".

== Plot ==
As a hacker of the renowned hacking group "Steppenwolf", Tōru Sōma (相馬 透, Sōma Tōru) and his partners earn their living by hacking into servers and selling the information they steal.

As the last hacking before disbanding their group, they hacked into a military server, but soon they find this is a setup by the military to lure terrorists, and they were drawn into battle between two factions. At the end, one of Tōru Sōma's friends was killed by an unknown Simulacrum, while most other group members have been arrested. To investigate and avenge his friend's death, Tōru accepted the offer to join the military.

== Characters ==
=== Steppenwolf ===
Tooru Souma (相馬 透, Sōma Tōru)
Voiced by: Akira Ishida (PS2 Version), Kenichi Suzumura (OVA Version) (Japanese); Jason Liebrecht (English)

Tsukina Sasagiri (笹桐 月菜, Sasagiri Tsukina)
Voiced by: Miya Serizono (PC Version), Ayako Kawasumi (PS2 Version), Rina Sato (OVA Version) (Japanese); Trina Nishimura (English)

Yuuya Nonomura (野々村 優哉, Nonomura Yūya)
Voiced by: Kazuki Yamaguchi (PC Version), Shinichiro Miki (PS2 Version), Hiroki Takahashi (OVA Version) (Japanese); Christopher R. Sabat, Travis Willingham (young) (English)

Akira Nikaidou (二階堂 あきら, Nikaidō Akira)
Voiced by: Gekki Kanna (PC Version), Souichiro Hoshi (PS2 Version), Kentaro Ito (OVA Version) (Japanese); Eric Vale (English)

=== FLAK ===
Minori Segawa (瀬川 みのり, Segawa Minori)
Voiced by: Manami Takeshita (PC Version), Yukari Fukui (PS2 Version), Mai Nakahara (OVA Version) (Japanese); Gwendolyn Lau (English)

Ayane Shidou (紫藤 彩音, Shidō Ayane)
Voiced by: Shoko Sakamoto (PC Version), Michiko Neya (PS2 Version), Hitomi Nabatame (OVA Version) (Japanese); Brina Palencia (English)

Kaira Kirsten (カイラ・キルステン, Kaira Kirusuten)
Voiced by: Satomi Watanabe (PC Version), Manabi Mizuno (PS2 Version), Shizuka Ito (OVA Version) (Japanese); Leah Clark (English)

Yousuke Kashiwagi (柏木 洋介, Kashiwagi Yōsuke)
Voiced by: Kunihiko Akita (PC Version), Daisuke Hirakawa (PS2 Version), Daisuke Ono (OVA Version) (Japanese); Christopher Bevins (English)

Souji Yagisawa (八木澤 宗次, Yagisawa Sōji)
Voiced by: Toru Sakura (PC Version), Ryusuke Obayashi (PS2 Version), Shinpachi Tsuji (OVA Version) (Japanese); Mark Stoddard (English)

Gen Gondou (権堂 厳, Gondō Gen)
Voiced by: Eiji Takemoto (PC Version), Ken Narita (PS2 Version), Tomomichi Nishimura (OVA Version) (Japanese); Cole Brown (English)

=== Fei Dao ===
Qu Wong (クーウォン, Kūwon)
Voiced by: Ryoku Riki (PC Version), Akio Otsuka (PS2 Version), Keiji Fujiwara (OVA Version)

Liang (リャン, Ryan)
Voiced by: Aoi Sakuragi (PC Version), Mamiko Noto (PS2 Version), Nana Mizuki (OVA Version) (Japanese); Colleen Clinkenbeard (English)

Genha (ゲンハ, Genha)
Voiced by: Tomokazu Toriyama (PC Version), Shigeru Chiba (PS2 Version), Wataru Takagi (OVA Version) (Japanese); Chris Cason (English)

=== Others ===
Reika Tachibana (橘 玲佳, Tachibana Reika)
Voiced by: Wataru Kaiato (PC Version), Atsuko Tanaka (PS2 Version), Sayaka Ohara (OVA Version) (Japanese); Stephanie Young (English)

Bachelor (バチェラ, Bachera)
Voiced by: Mamoru Ayukawa (PC Version), Haruko Momoi (PS2 Version), Houko Kuwashima (OVA Version) (Japanese); Luci Christian (English)

Ren Mizusaka (水坂 憐, Mizusaka Ren)
Voiced by: Natsumi Yanase (PC Version), Sakura Nogawa (PS2 Version), Noriko Shitaya (OVA Version) (Japanese); Carrie Savage (English)

== Releases ==
=== Baldr Force EXE ===
Baldr Force EXE is an updated version of Baldr Force, released for Windows, Dreamcast, and PlayStation 2.

Baldr Force EXE adds the following:

- Bald hell mode
- New weapon: gravity field
- Super easy mode
- Bald checker 1/2 data

The Dreamcast and PlayStation 2 versions removed the adult only scenes.

The PS2 version has a new voice casting, a new theme song, a new opening movie and a new cutscene. Hyper mode and time attack mode were also added to this version.

The Premium pack version, available at the PlayStation 2's rerelease, includes a mech figure. The Dreamcast Sega Direct online shop rerelease came with a Telephone card, poster and mech figure.

=== Baldr Force "Standard Edition" ===
It is the PC port of the PlayStation 2 version. However, the title song is still based on the original Windows games. It includes enhanced visuals.

An early order includes a full remake of the soundtrack CD.

=== Baldr Force Re-Action ===
It is a game included with Xross Scramble, which uses Baldr Force characters.

== OVA ==
- BALDR FORCE EXE Resolution

バルドフォース エグゼ レソリューション (Barudo Fōsu Eguze Resoryūshon)
- Genre: Action, mecha, virtual reality
- Original video animation
- Directed by: Takayuki Tanaka
- Produced by: Yasuyuki Ueda
- Music by: Takeshi Watanabe
- Studio: Satelight
- Licensed by: NA: Funimation; UK: Manga Entertainment
- Released: October 11, 2006 – April 4, 2007
- Episodes: 4

An OVA based on the game entitled, "BALDR FORCE EXE Resolution" was released on October 11, 2006. The OVA consists of 4 episodes and was directed by Takashi Yamazaki. Funimation licensed the OVA for North American distribution on July 21, 2007, and it was released on May 20, 2008, including all 4 episodes on one DVD. Funimation released the OVA under the name Baldr Force EXE, dropping "Resolution" from the title. The OVA's opening theme is "Face of Fact (Resolution Ver.)" by Kotoko, and the ending theme is "Undelete" by Mami Kawada.

=== Plot ===
An entire world exists unseen, a world that can be accessed only by the mind ... the Wired World. A place of freedom. And occasionally a place of death.

Tōru Sōma knows the land of the logged-in well, for he and his fearless gang of hackers once had the run of the place. But as tragedy came to call and the group disbanded, he was forced to join the ranks of FLAK; a military organization charged with protecting the hidden data paradise deep within the vast network of servers. Indentured into service and out for revenge, Tōru cannot let go of the dead of the past even as a ghost of the present takes shape.

Tōru with the loneliness and confusion of being trapped between two worlds, there is only one question ... What is reality?

== Reception ==
Helen McCarthy put "BALDR FORCE EXE Resolution" into the book 500 Essential Anime Movies and stated that "the story is simple, but has plenty of well crafted CGI action".

== See also ==
- Baldr Sky
