= Legends of War =

Legends of War: Patton's Campaign
- Developer: Enigma Software Productions
- Publisher: Enigma Software Productions
- Platforms: PlayStation Portable, PlayStation 3, Xbox 360, Windows, PS Vita
- Release: 20 October 2010 (EU PSP/PSN); 4 January 2011 (USA PSP/PSN); 6 November 2012 (NA PS3/X360/PC); 3 March 2013 (EU PS3/X360/PC); 20 April 2013 (EU PS Vita)
- Genre: Turn-based strategy
- Modes: Single-player, multiplayer

Legends of War is a turn-based strategy video game series created in 2010 by the Spanish development company Enigma Software Productions.

The series is for PSP, PS3, Xbox 360, PC and PS Vita, and is set in different historical time periods and wars through the point of view of notable military figures.

The first title of the series is Legends of War: Patton's Campaign, set during World War II, in the General Patton campaign to end Nazi rule. It was first launched on October 20, 2010 on PSN for PSP system before it was released in 2012 and 2013 for the other platforms.

== Gameplay ==
The player assumes the role of George S. Patton of the US army, during the late stages of the conflict, from the Normandy invasion, to the German capitulation and the end of the war in Europe. The player has the opportunity to change history and reach Berlin before the Soviet army does.

The game starts one month after the Normandy landings, when the command of the U.S. Third Army is assigned to Patton. Through different operations, the player advances along the historical path of Patton's Third Army traversing the Western European Theatre of operations.

Patton is the main character in the game, and his characteristics will directly affect his troops' performance in the missions. Initially Patton has certain points for each characteristic, so the player will be able to increase those points after each mission. Players can upgrade in 7 categories, namely Prestige, Offensive capabilities, Defensive capabilities, Tactical capabilities, Logistics, Charisma and Experience.

Climate is another of the features in the game, including dense fog, rain and large snowfalls.

=== Modes ===
• The Patton's Campaign: The player controls Patton's Third Army from the French beaches to the German capital. Through different operations, the player advances along the historical path of Patton's Third Army traversing the Western European Theatre of operations. This mode is divided into seven different operations, which are in turn divided into 35 different missions on 22 different maps.

• Multiplayer Mode (Hotseat): This mechanism uses a system of turns which allows two players to play the game using the same console, one controlling the American forces and the other controlling the German forces.

== Awards ==
Legends of War: Patton's Campaign won an award at the VI Editions of Desarrollador_Es for the "Best Handheld Game" in 2011.
