= List of Brian Blessed performances =

The following is a list of performances by the English actor Brian Blessed:

== Filmography ==
=== Film ===
Year	Title	Role	Notes	Ref
1966	The Christmas Tree	The Policeman		
1968	Till Death Us Do Part	Sergeant		
1970	Country Dance	Jack Baird		
1971	The Last Valley	Korski		
1971	The Trojan Women	Talthybius		
1972	Henry VIII and His Six Wives	Earl of Suffolk		
1972	Man of La Mancha	Pedro		
1975	King Arthur, the Young Warlord	Mark of Cornwall	Compilation film	
1976	The Eagle Has Landed		Voice	
1980	Flash Gordon	Prince Vultan		
1983	High Road to China	Suleman Khan		
1989	Asterix and the Big Fight	Caous	Voice, English dub	
1989	Henry V	Duke Thomas Beaufort of Exeter		
1991	Robin Hood: Prince of Thieves	Lord Locksley		
1992	Back in the USSR	Chazov		
1992	Freddie as F.R.O.7	El Supremo	Voice	
1993	Much Ado About Nothing	Signor Antonio		
1994	Chasing the Deer	Maj. Elliot		
1996	The Bruce	King Edward I of England		
1996	Hamlet	Ghost		
1997	Macbeth	Edward the Confessor	Also directed one scene	
1999	King Lear	King Lear	Also director	
1999	Tarzan	Clayton, Tarzan yell	Voice	
1999	Star Wars: Episode I – The Phantom Menace	Boss Nass	Voice	
2000	The Mumbo Jumbo	Lucifer Bounder		
2003	Devil's Harvest	Father Gabriel Norton		
2004	448 BC: Olympiad of Ancient Hellas	Narrator		
2004	Alexander	Wrestling trainer		
2006	The Conclave	Aeneas Sylvius Piccolomini		
2006	As You Like It	Duke Frederick; Duke Senior		
2006	Day of Wrath	Lord Francisco del Ruiz		
2007	Back in Business	Trevor Pilkington		
2008	Agent Crush	Boris Goudphater	Voice	
2009	Mr. Bojagi	Mr. Bojagi	Short film	
2011	Re-Evolution	Mr Finney		
2012	The Pirates! In an Adventure with Scientists	Pirate King	Voice	
2012	So You Want to Be a Pirate!	Pirate King	Voice	
2012	Santa's Blotto	Santa	Short film	
2014	Legends of Oz: Dorothy's Return	Judge Jawbreaker	Voice	
2014	Death Knight Love Story	Arthas, the Lich King	Voice, short film	
2014	The Seventeenth Kind	The Voice	Voice, short film	
2014	Decline of an Empire	Modern Day Priest		
2015	Dragon	Sir Rory of Puddleton	Short film	
2015	The Big Knights	Sir Morris	Compilation film	
2016	The Harklets in Reality Capture for Cinema	Unnamed	Voice	
2018	Eric and the Barbarian	Odin	Short film	
2018	Robin Hood: The Rebellion	Friar Tuck		
2018	Ode to Saint Cecilia	George F. Handel	Direct-to-video	
2019	Shed of the Dead	Narrator	Voice	
2019	Gandidean	Jim	Short	
2020	Dear Mr. Burton	Narrator	Voice, short	
2021	Trollhunters: Rise of the Titans	Charlemagne	Voice	

=== Television ===
Year	Title	Role	Notes	Ref
1962–1965	Z-Cars	PC "Fancy" Smith	Main role	
1963	Ghost Squad	Policeman	Episode: "Catspaw"	
1966-1967	The Three Musketeers	Porthos		
1967	The Further Adventures of the Musketeers	Porthos		
1967–1969	The Avengers	Mark Dayton, Sergeant Hearn	2 episodes	
1968	The Troubleshooters	Eddie Barnaby	Episode: "Stop It, You're Breaking My Heart"	
1968	Cold Comfort Farm	Reuben Starkadder	3 episodes	
1969	Barrister at Law	Tom Gardner	Television film	
1969	Randall and Hopkirk (Deceased)	Jim Lawsey	Episode: "The Ghost Who Saved the Bank at Monte Carlo"	
1969–1970	The Wednesday Play	Peter; Will	2 episodes	
1970	Crime of Passion	Pierre Lombard	Episode: "Pierre"	
1970	Whom God Hath Joined	Mark Ridware	Television film	
1971	Jackanory	Storyteller	5 episodes	
1971	The Expert	Hubert Innes	Episode: "A Clear and Easy Duty"	
1971	Owen, M.D.	Bill Tulley	2 episodes	
1971	Shirley's World	Sir Nigel	Episode: "Knightmare"	
1972	The Venturers	Harry Shannon	Television film	
1972–1973	Arthur of the Britons	Mark of Cornwall	7 episodes	
1973	Public Eye	Rev. William Pratt	Episode: "Egg and Cress Sandwiches"	
1973	Justice	Tiger Lawson	Episode: "The Whole Truth?"	
1973	Love Story	Andrew	Episode: "Reflections"	
1973	ITV Sunday Night Theatre	Ted Gissing	Episode: "Lorna and Ted"	
1973	Hadleigh	Joseph Roper	Episode: "The Last Rent Dinner"	
1973	BBC Play of the Month	Sgt. Kite	Episode: "The Recruiting Officer"	
1974	Boy Dominic	William Woodcock		
1975	Notorious Woman	Albert Grzymala	Miniseries	
1975	The Sweeney	Frank Kemble	Episode: "Ringer"	
1975–1976	Space: 1999	Dr. Cabot Rowland; Mentor	2 episodes	
1976	The Day After Tomorrow	Dr Tom Bowen		
1976	Thriller	Detective Sargeant Briggs	Episode: "A Midsummer Nightmare"	
1976	I, Claudius	Augustus	5 episodes	
1977	Survivors	Brod	Episode: "Law of the Jungle"	
1977	A Christmas Carol	Narrator	Television film	
1978	Blake's 7	Vargas	Episode: "Cygnus Alpha"	
1979	The Aphrodite Inheritance	Basileos	Main role	
1979	Tales of the Unexpected	Detective Sergeant Jack Nolan	Episode: "Lamb to the Slaughter"	
1980	The Joy of Bach	J.S. Bach himself		
1981	The Little World of Don Camillo	Peppone		
1983	Great Little Railways	Himself		
1983	The Hound of the Baskervilles	Geoffrey Lyons	Television film	
1983	The Black Adder	Richard IV	6 episodes	
1983	The Winds of War	General Yevlenko	1 Episode (uncredited)	
1983	Castle	Master James of Babbington	Voice; also narrator of introductory segment	
1984	The Last Days of Pompeii	Olinthus		
1984	The Master of Ballantrae	Captain Teach		
1986	Cathedral	Master Guillaume de Solis	Voice	
1986	Doctor Who	King Yrcanos	Serial: Mindwarp	
1986	Return to Treasure Island	Long John Silver		
1987	Crossbow	Gaston	Episodes: "The Pass" "Misalliance"	
1987	My Family and Other Animals	Spiro		
1988	War and Remembrance	General Yevlenko		
1988	Pyramid	Grand Vizier Ankhaf	Voice; also narrator at the start of the first animated sequence	
1989	Boon	Lambert Sampson	Episode: "Banbury Blue"	
1989	Minder	Detective Inspector Dyer	Episode: "The Last Video Show"	
1990	The Castle of Adventure	Sam; Scar		
1991	Lovejoy	Harry Catapodis	Episode: "The Black Virgin of Vladimir"	
1991	Prisoner of Honor	General Gonse		
1991	Galahad of Everest	George Mallory		
1993	Lady Chatterley	Petty Officer	Episode: "Episode #1.4"	
1994	Roman City	General Gaius Valerius	Voice	
1994	MacGyver: Lost Treasure of Atlantis	Atticus	Television film	
1995	Johnny and the Dead	William 'Bill' Sticker		
1995	Kidnapped	Cluny MacPherson	Television film	
1996	Catherine the Great	Bestuzhev		
1996	Summit Fever	Self	Documentary	
1997	The History of Tom Jones: a Foundling	Squire Western		
1997	Sooty & Co	Santa Claus	Episode: "Fun in the Snow"	
1998	Dennis the Menace	Captain	Episode: "Skull and Crossbones"	
1999	Adam's Family Tree	Cavalier	Episode: "A Cavalier Spirit"	
1999-2000	The Big Knights	Sir Morris	Voice	
1999	The Greatest Store in the World	Mr. Scottley	Television film	
1999	The Nearly Complete and Utter History of Everything	King Henry VIII	Television film	
2000	Sooty Heights	Practical Joker	Episode: "You Must Be Joking"	
2001	Fun at the Funeral Parlour	Himself	Episode: "The Mountains of Doom"	
2001	Alexander the Great	Narrator	Video documentary	
2001	I Love Christmas	Father Christmas, Host/Self	Television documentary	
2003	Winter Solstice	Max	Television film	
2004	The Legend of the Tamworth Two	Wild Boar	Voice	
2006	Mist: The Tale of a Sheepdog Puppy	Sir Gregory	Television film	
2007–2011	Doctors	Dominic Duvall / Micky 'Rebel' Becket	2 episodes	
2008	Kika & Bob	Bob		
2008	The Wrong Door	Captain Goiter	2 episodes	
2008	Family Guy	Prince Vultan	Voice, episode: "Road to Germany"	
2008	The Royal	Sir Edward Fawcett	Episode: "Pastures New"	
2008	Have I Got News for You	Guest Presenter / Father Christmas	Episodes: "Episode #35.3" "Episode #36.10"	
2009	Henry 8.0	Henry Tudor		
2010	Fee Fi Fo Yum	GTV Announcer	Voice	
2010	Little Princess	Great Uncle Walter	Episode: "I Want My Horace"	
2010–present	Peppa Pig	Grampy Rabbit	Recurring role	
2010	Eliab Gets Grounded	Eliab's Grandpa	Episode: Eliab's Grandpa	
2010–2011	The Legend of Dick and Dom	King	Episodes: "Beastly" "Home"	
2011	Wojtek: The Bear That Went to War	Narrator	Video documentary	
2011	QI	Himself	Episode: "Ice"	
2012	Lego Star Wars: The Empire Strikes Out	Boss Nass	Voice, television special	
2012–13	Wizards vs Aliens	Nekross King	Voice, series 1 and 2	
2012-19	The Amazing World of Gumball	Santa Claus	Voice, 3 episodes	
2013	Have I Got News for You	Guest Presenter	Episode: "Episode #45.2"	
2013	Piers Morgan's Life Stories	Himself	Episode: "Brian Blessed"	
2013	Sooty	Santa Claus	Episode: "Pranks and Presents"	
2013	Russell Howard's Good News	Himself	Series: 8 "Episode 10"	
2013–15	Henry Hugglemonster	Eduardo Enormomonster	Voice	
2015	Toast of London	Col. Gonville Toast	Episode: "Hamm on Toast"	
2015-16	Danger Mouse	Santa Claus	Voice, 2 episodes	
2016	Would I Lie to You?	Himself	Series 10, Episode 5	
2017	The Lodge	Walter	Episode: "No Hard Feelings"	
2017	Santa Blessed's Christmas Sleighlist	Santa Blessed	Festive Music TV Special	
2017	The Heroic Quest of the Valiant Prince Ivandoe	The Moany Mountain	Episode: "The Prince and the Moany Mountain"	
2019	Small Fortune	Big Voice	Voice, 3 episodes	
2020	Wizards: Tales of Arcadia	Charlemagne	Episode: "Dragon's Den"	
2020	Worzel Gummidge	Abraham Longshanks	Voice, episode: "Saucy Nancy"	
2020	The Apeman of the Amazon	The Host	TV Short	
2022	Close Enough	Sir Jack Kleghorn	Voice, episode: "Never Meet Your Heroes"	

=== Video games ===
Year	Title	Voice role	Notes	Ref
1996	Privateer 2: The Darkening	Uncle Kashumai	Live-action	
1999	Tarzan	Clayton		
2002	Kingdom Hearts	Clayton	English dub	
2003	Warhammer 40,000: Fire Warrior	Admiral Constantine		
2006	Rome Total War: Alexander	Narrator		
2008	Viking: Battle for Asgard	Narrator		
2009	Invizimals	Professor Dawson		
2009	Pinball Pulse: The Ancients Beckon	Zeus		
2010	Invizimals: Shadow Zone	Professor Dawson		
2011	Invizimals: The Lost Tribes	Professor Dawson		
2012	War of the Roses	Narrator		
2013	Invizimals: The Alliance	Professor Dawson		
2014	Elite Dangerous	Vasco		
2016	Lego Dimensions	Battle Arena Announcer		
2017	Loco Dojo	The Grand Sensei		
2017	Total War: Warhammer II	Gotrek Gurnisson		
2018	Kingdom Come: Deliverance	Konrad Kyeser		
2018	Call of Duty: Black Ops 4	Jonathan Warwick	Zombies mode	
2021	Evil Genius 2	Red Ivan		
2022	Lego Star Wars: The Skywalker Saga	Boss Nass		

== Stage ==
Year	Title	Role	Notes
1957	Blood Wedding	Unknown	Bristol Old Vic Theatre School
1957–58	The Room	Unknown	National Student Drama Festival.
1957–58	Camino Real	Unknown	Bristol Old Vic – Theatre Royal.
1959	The Man with the Golden Arm	'Zero' Schweifka / McTigue	Nottingham Playhouse
1959	The Rape of the Belt	Zeus	Nottingham Theatre Trust
1959	A Midsummer Night's Dream	Snug	Nottingham Playhouse (Goldsmith Street)
1960	Henry IV, Part 2	Justice Silence	Birmingham Repertory Theatre
1960	Henry IV, Part 1	Unknown	Birmingham Repertory Theatre
1960	The School for Scandal	Unknown	Birmingham Repertory Theatre
1960	Lysistrata	Unknown	Birmingham Repertory Theatre
1960	One Way Pendulum	Unknown	Birmingham Repertory Theatre
1960	The Cherry Orchard	Lopakhin	Birmingham Repertory Theatre
1960	One Man’s Meat	Big Mac's Voice	Birmingham Repertory Theatre
1960	Family First	Swedenhelm	Birmingham Repertory Theatre
1960	The Bastard Country	John Willy	Birmingham Repertory Company
1960	Strange to Relate	The Policeman	Birmingham Repertory Theatre Company
1960	Hobson’s Choice	Tubby Wadlow	Birmingham Repertory Theatre
1960	The Three Cavaliers	Sgt. Tidy	Birmingham Repertory Theatre
1961	Antony and Cleopatra	Lepidus/Guard to Antony	Birmingham Repertory Theatre
1966	Incident at Vichy	Bayard, the Electrician	Phoenix Theatre, London
1975	The Exorcism	Edmund	Comedy Theatre, London
1977	State of Revolution	Gorky	National Theatre – Lyttelton, National Theatre and Birmingham Repertory Theatre.
1979	The Devil’s Disciple	Rev Anthony Anderson	Chichester Festival Theatre
1979	The Eagle Has Two Heads	Baron Foehn	Chichester Festival Theatre
1980	Macbeth	Banquo	A production starring Peter O'Toole at The Old Vic Theatre.
1981–2002	Cats	Bustopher Jones; Old Deuteronomy	Andrew Lloyd Webber's musical at the New London Theatre in West End
1983-4	Henry V	Duke of Exeter	Royal Shakespeare Company, Stratford-Upon-Avon
1984–85	Richard III	Lord Hastings	Royal Shakespeare Company, Stratford-Upon-Avon
1984–85	Hamlet	Claudius	RSC production, directed by Ron Daniels. Roger Rees as Hamlet and Virginia McKenna as Gertrude. Kenneth Branagh was also in the cast as Laertes.
1989	Metropolis	John Freeman	Joseph Brooks and Dusty Hughes's musical adaptation of the 1927 silent film at the Piccadilly Theatre in West End
1994–95	The Wizard of Oz	Zeke/Cowardly Lion	Theatre Royal, Bath
2000	Hard Times: The Musical	Charles Dickens	Theatre Royal, Haymarket, London and Theatre Royal, Windsor.
2001	The Relapse	Sir Tunbelly Clumsy	National Theatre – Olivier, National Theatre
2002	Chitty Chitty Bang Bang	Baron Bomburst	The Sherman Brothers' musical adaptation of the 1968 film at the London Palladium in West End
2004	The Haunted Hotel	Sir Francis Westwick	Mercury Theatre Colchester, and Theatre Royal Windsor
2005–06	Peter Pan	Mr Darling / Captain	Regent Theatre, Ipswich
2009–10	Jack and the Beanstalk	Voice of the Giant	Towngate Theatre, Basildon
2009–10	Aladdin	Unknown	New Wimbledon Theatre
2016	Eugenius!	Space Lord	Voice only Ben Adams and Chris Wilkins' musical at the London Palladium in West End

== Audio dramas ==
Year	Title	Role	Notes	Ref
2001	Les Misérables	Jean Valjean	Focus on the Family Radio Theatre	
2013	The Extraordinary Adventures of G.A. Henty: Under Drake's Flag	G.A. Henty		
2014	The Extraordinary Adventures of G.A. Henty: In Freedom's Cause	G.A. Henty	(Post-Production)	
2015	The Extraordinary Adventures of G.A. Henty: The Dragon And The Raven	G.A. Henty		
2018	Warhammer Age of Sigmar: Realmslayer	Gotrek Gurnisson		
2019	Warhammer Age of Sigmar: Realmslayer - Blood of the Old World	Gotrek Gurnisson		
