= Invizimals: The Lost Tribes =

2011 video game

- Developer: Novarama
- Publisher: Sony Computer Entertainment
- Series: Invizimals
- Platform: PlayStation Portable
- Release: EU: 4 November 2011; NA: 23 September 2014
- Genre: Monster-taming
- Modes: Single-player, multiplayer

Invizimals: The Lost Tribes is an augmented reality role-playing video game developed by Novarama and published by Sony Computer Entertainment for the PlayStation Portable. It is the sequel to 2009's Invizimals, and 2010's Invizimals: Shadow Zone. As such, it is a collectible creature game, and requires the PSP's camera attachment for play. It was released in November 2011 in Europe and September 2014 in North America, being the last first-party game release for the PSP in the region. A sequel, Invizimals: The Alliance was released for the PlayStation Vita in 2013.

== Plot ==
Three years after the events of Invizimals: Shadow Zone, Kenichi's closest colleagues are continuing their own research. Professor Alex Michaels is continuing Invizimal research in Antarctica, following a tip from Kenichi of signs of Invizimal life being in Antarctica. Jazmin Nayar has become an archaeologist and is exploring ancient ruins across Europe and has retired from Invizimal research.

The player mysteriously gets a knock at their house late at night. When they answer the door, the stranger knocking left and laid a package at their doorstep. Inside the package is a diary. Throughout the story, the player is tasked with rebuilding the diary's pages, with the diary having belonged to Kenichi, and its pages containing details of Kenichi's endeavors throughout the past 3 years.

After convincing Jazmin to resume finding Invizimals, while she was exploring ruins in Athens, Jazmin identifies Kenichi on a mural in one of the ruins, indicating that not only is Kenichi still alive, but he has also travelled through time and altered history. After the player helps Professor Michaels in finding Invizimal lifeforms in Antarctica, Michaels confirms that Kenichi must have visited Antarctica at some point.

With suspicions of Kenichi still being alive, Jazmin and Professor Michaels go to Kenichi's old apartment in Kyoto, Japan to see if he is there. Although he is not present, a stranger has already gotten into Kenichi's department and is rummaging through his documents. After initially scaring Jazmin, it's revealed that the stranger in Kenichi's apartment is Professor Scott Dawson, Bob Dawson's son that no one had ever seen before. They inquire about his father Bob Dawson. Scott revealed that, after Kenichi entered the portal to the Invizimal world, his father became despondent and secluded ever since, refusing to talk to anyone and living reclusively on an island in Scotland, not even allowing Scott to talk to him. Scott eventually found Kenichi's diary and confirms that he gave the player Kenichi's diary due to the player's close relationship with him. While exploring Kenichi's research data, they find one of Kenichi's most significant discoveries: two Invizimals are capable of fighting together as a tag team in combat.

While exploring Kenichi's apartment, they find a secret downstairs area that is guarded by a robotic Invizimal Kenichi placed there. After defeating the Kabuto Robo Kenichi placed in his apartment, the trio find the downstairs area, where an enormous vault is found. Inside this vault is the rumored shadow gate, a portal that Kenichi constructed that freely allows him to travel to the Invizimal world. However, a specific plant-based Invizimal named Audrey needs to be found in order to activate the shadow gate. Professor Michaels promptly travels to Thailand, where Audrey can supposedly be found. After traversing various jungles, Michaels and the player eventually find and capture an Audrey, and bring it back to Kenichi's apartment in Kyoto. Once the player clears the cave of the guardians that Kenichi placed there, Michaels places Audrey down near the shadow gate, and the shadow gate activates. The player volunteers to go through the shadow gate and enters The Wave.

However, Campbell greets the player as soon as they go through the gate, having set a trap Campbell knew the player would walk into. Campbell reveals that he has created new methods to make Dark Invizimals, and that he is constructing his own army in order to take command of the shadow gate, thus allowing him to rule both the human world and The Wave. Campbell imprisons the player and forces them to fight their way out, as well as acquire and train Dark Invizimals for Campbell's army, which they eventually do. After escaping Campbell's prison, the player successfully finds Kenichi, who is meditating in Bhutanese mountains. Kenichi explains that he's able to travel not just through time, but also travel between the Invizimal world and the real world. Kenichi kept the information hidden from everyone he knew since he was initially unsure about the safety of the shadow gate and living in The Wave. Kenichi reveals to the player that he is aware of Campbell's presence, actions, and negative influence on The Wave. However, Kenichi has learned that Dark Invizimals are not inherently evil, and that they are simply from a different tribe. Kenichi warns that Campbell is approaching his location in an attempt to wrest control of the shadow gate away from Kenichi, and Kenichi tasks the player with combining the forces of Light and Dark Tigersharks to take on Campbell, who has an army of Dark Invizimals at his command.

After the player collects the Light and Dark Tigersharks, Campbell storms Kenichi's temple to overthrow him and take command of the shadow gate. After Kenichi and Campbell have a war of words where Kenichi argues that the Dark Invizimals are not inherently mere tools of evil, but rather Campbell nurtured them into becoming evil, Campbell strikes down Kenichi, and challenges the player to a battle. After the player defeats him, Campbell is defeated for the final time.

After Campbell is defeated, Kenichi travels back to the real world and catches up with his friends, explaining to them why he kept such a low profile and why he kept them in the dark with regards to what he was doing. Kenichi and his friends live peacefully knowing that they can freely travel into the Invizimal world with no harm to themselves, and with Kenichi having returned.

== Development ==
The title features 150 creatures to collect, with 70 brand new ones, and 80 of the community's favourite previous Invizimals. The Lost Tribes features a new campaign, and a 2-on-2 tag team battle mode.

The game's announcement came on the same day as Sony Computer Entertainment Europe announced an exclusive relationship with series developer, Novarama.
