= List of video games that support cross-platform play =

Cross-platform play is the ability to allow different gaming platforms to share the same online servers in a game, allowing players to join regardless of the platform they own. Since the Dreamcast and PlayStation 2, there have been some online video games that support cross-play. Listed here is an incomplete list of games that support cross-play with their consoles, computers, mobile, and handheld game consoles note when using.

While PC versions for games on Microsoft Windows, Linux, or MacOS that have cross-platform support. In contrast, those that are only limited to Windows can work with Wine, or Proton on Linux or MacOS to have multiplayer working on their respective platform. Steam has support for them in use like the Steam Deck but it could be considered not cross-platform as those are only compatibility layers from Windows except certain games with Anti-Cheat that do not work.

== Games which currently support cross-platform play ==
Title	PC						Mobile		Eighth gen consoles			Ninth gen consoles		Others	Ref.
Title	Linux	Mac	Windows PC				iOS	Android	PS4	XBO	Switch	PS5	XBSX/XBSS	Others	Ref.
Title	Linux	Mac	GOG	Steam	Xbox	Other	iOS	Android	PS4	XBO	Switch	PS5	XBSX/XBSS	Others	Ref.
#IDARB					Xbox					XBO					
99Vidas									PS4					PS3	
2XKO						Riot						PS5	XBSX/XBSS		
A-Men														PS3, Vita	
Alien Breed														PS3, Vita	
Aliens: Fireteam Elite				Steam	Xbox				PS4	XBO		PS5	XBSX/XBSS		
Among Us			GOG	Steam	Xbox	Epic	iOS	Android	PS4	XBO	Switch	PS5	XBSX/XBSS	GeForce Now	
Apex Legends				Steam		EA			PS4	XBO	Switch	PS5	XBSX/XBSS	GeForce Now	
Aragami	Linux	Mac	GOG	Steam						XBO	Switch			Luna	
ARC Raiders				Steam		Epic						PS5	XBSX/XBSS	GeForce Now	
Ark: Survival Ascended				Steam	Xbox							PS5	XBSX/XBSS		
Ark: Survival Evolved	Linux	Mac		Steam		Epic								GeForce Now	
Ark: Survival Evolved					Xbox					XBO				Xbox Cloud Gaming	
Ark: Survival Evolved							iOS	Android							
Armello				Steam					PS4	XBO	Switch				
The Ascent					Xbox					XBO			XBSX/XBSS		
Assetto Corsa Competizione												PS5	XBSX/XBSS		
Astroneer					Xbox					XBO					
Atomic Ninjas														PS3, Vita	
Atom Universe				Steam					PS4						
Back 4 Blood				Steam	Xbox	Epic			PS4	XBO		PS5	XBSX/XBSS		
Backgammon Blitz									PS4					PS3, Vita	
Battlefield 2042									PS4	XBO					
Battlefield 2042				Steam		EA, Epic						PS5	XBSX/XBSS		
Battlefield 6				Steam		EA, Epic						PS5	XBSX/XBSS		
Black Desert Online									PS4	XBO					
BlazBlue: Calamity Trigger						GFWL								XB360	
BlazBlue: Chrono Phantasma									PS4			PS5		PS3	
BlobCat				Steam							Switch				
Borderlands 3		Mac		Steam	Xbox	Epic			PS4	XBO		PS5	XBSX/XBSS		
Boundless		Mac		Steam					PS4			PS5			
Brawlhalla		Mac		Steam			iOS	Android	PS4	XBO	Switch	PS5	XBSX/XBSS	GeForce Now	
Breakers Collection				Steam					PS4	XBO	Switch	PS5	XBSX/XBSS		
Call of Duty: Black Ops Cold War				Steam		Battle.net			PS4	XBO		PS5	XBSX/XBSS		
Call of Duty: Modern Warfare				Steam		Battle.net			PS4	XBO					
Call of Duty: Modern Warfare II				Steam	Xbox	Battle.net			PS4	XBO		PS5	XBSX/XBSS		
Call of Duty: Modern Warfare III				Steam	Xbox	Battle.net			PS4	XBO		PS5	XBSX/XBSS		
Call of Duty: Vanguard				Steam		Battle.net			PS4	XBO		PS5	XBSX/XBSS		
Call of Duty: Warzone				Steam	Xbox	Battle.net			PS4	XBO					
Crackdown 3					Xbox					XBO					
Crazy Justice				Steam						XBO	Switch				
Chessaria: The Tactical Adventure		Mac		Steam											
Chess Ultra				Steam						XBO	Switch				
Chess Ultra				Steam					PS4						
CounterAttack: Uprising	Linux	Mac		Steam		Epic				XBO	Switch				
Crash Drive 3				Steam		Epic	iOS	Android	PS4	XBO	Switch	PS5	XBSX/XBSS		
Crusader Kings III	Linux	Mac		Steam	Xbox										
Cubemen 2	Linux	Mac		Steam			iOS	Android						Wii U	
Curses 'N Chaos									PS4			PS5		Vita	
Dauntless						Epic	iOS	Android	PS4	XBO	Switch	PS5	XBSX/XBSS	GeForce Now	
DC Universe Online				Steam					PS4			PS5			
Dead by Daylight				Steam	Xbox	Epic			PS4	XBO	Switch	PS5	XBSX/XBSS	GeForce Now	
Dead by Daylight							iOS	Android							
Dead or Alive 5 Plus														PS3, Vita	
Deathmatch Village														PS3, Vita	
Deception IV: Blood Ties														PS3, Vita	
Deep Rock Galactic					Xbox					XBO			XBSX/XBSS		
Destiny 2				Steam	Xbox	Epic			PS4	XBO		PS5	XBSX/XBSS	Xbox Cloud Gaming, GeForce Now	
Dick Wilde 2				Steam					PS4			PS5			
Dofus	Linux	Mac			Xbox	Other									
DOOM + DOOM II			GOG	Steam	Xbox	Epic			PS4	XBO	Switch	PS5	XBSX/XBSS		
Diablo Immortal						Battle.net	iOS	Android							
Diablo IV				Steam		Battle.net			PS4	XBO		PS5	XBSX/XBSS		
Digimon Story: Cyber Sleuth									PS4			PS5		Vita	
Digimon Story: Cyber Sleuth – Hacker's Memory									PS4			PS5		Vita	
Dirt 5				Steam	Xbox				PS4	XBO		PS5	XBSX/XBSS		
Disc Jam				Steam					PS4			PS5			
Disc Jam				Steam							Switch				
Disney Speedstorm				Steam	Xbox	Epic			PS4	XBO	Switch	PS5	XBSX/XBSS		
Divekick									PS4			PS5		PS3, Vita	
DJMax Respect V					Xbox					XBO			XBSX/XBSS	Xbox Cloud Gaming	
Dragon Quest Builders 2					Xbox				PS4	XBO	Switch				
Dragon Quest Heroes II									PS4			PS5		PS3, Vita	
Dragon's Crown									PS4			PS5		PS3, Vita	
Dragon's Dogma Online						Other			PS4			PS5		PS3	
Dreii									PS4			PS5		Vita	
Dreii	Linux	Mac		Steam										Wii U	
Duke Nukem 3D Megaton Edition														PS3, Vita	
Dynasty Warriors 8									PS4			PS5		PS3, Vita	
Eagle Flight				Steam					PS4			PS5			
Enlisted					Xbox					XBO			XBSX/XBSS		
The Elder Scrolls: Blades							iOS	Android			Switch				
Elemental Knights R							iOS	Android			Switch				
Europa Universalis IV	Linux	Mac		Steam	Xbox	Epic									
Eve Online		Mac		Steam		Epic, Other									
Eve: Valkyrie				Steam					PS4			PS5			
Everybody's Golf 6														PS3, Vita	
Exorder	Linux	Mac		Steam							Switch				
Fable Fortune					Xbox					XBO			XBSX/XBSS		
Factorio	Linux	Mac	GOG	Steam		Other									
Faeria				Steam	Xbox	Epic			PS4	XBO	Switch	PS5	XBSX/XBSS		
Fall Guys: Ultimate Knockout				Steam	Xbox	Epic	iOS	Android	PS4	XBO	Switch	PS5	XBSX/XBSS		
Fantasy Strike	Linux	Mac		Steam					PS4		Switch	PS5			
Final Fantasy: Crystal Chronicles							iOS	Android	PS4		Switch	PS5			
Final Fantasy XIV: A Realm Reborn		Mac		Steam		Other			PS4			PS5	XBSX/XBSS	PS3, Switch 2	
Final Fantasy XV					Xbox					XBO			XBSX/XBSS		
Foosball 2012														PS3, Vita	
Football Manager 2022				Steam	Xbox	Epic									
Football Manager 2022					Xbox					XBO			XBSX/XBSS		
Fortnite Battle Royale						Epic	iOS	Android	PS4	XBO	Switch	PS5	XBSX/XBSS	GeForce Now	
Forza Horizon 3					Xbox					XBO			XBSX/XBSS		
Forza Horizon 4				Steam	Xbox					XBO			XBSX/XBSS		
Forza Horizon 5				Steam	Xbox					XBO			XBSX/XBSS		
Forza Motorsport 7					Xbox					XBO			XBSX/XBSS		
Frozen Synapse	Linux	Mac	GOG	Steam		Other	iOS	Android							
Full Metal Furies					Xbox					XBO			XBSX/XBSS		
Games of Glory				Steam					PS4			PS5			
Gang Beasts		Mac		Steam	Xbox					XBO			XBSX/XBSS		
Garou: Mark of the Wolves									PS4			PS5		Vita	
Gears of War 4					Xbox					XBO			XBSX/XBSS		
Gears 5				Steam	Xbox					XBO			XBSX/XBSS		
Genesis				Steam					PS4			PS5			
Genshin Impact						Epic	iOS	Android	PS4			PS5	XBSX/XBSS		
God Eater Resurrection									PS4			PS5		Vita	
God Eater 2 Rage Burst									PS4			PS5		Vita	
Grand Kingdom									PS4			PS5		Vita	
Grid Legends				Steam		EA			PS4	XBO		PS5	XBSX/XBSS		
Grounded				Steam	Xbox					XBO			XBSX/XBSS		
Guilty Gear Strive				Steam					PS4	XBO		PS5	XBSX/XBSS		
Guilty Gear Xrd: Revelator									PS4			PS5		PS3	
Guilty Gear Xrd: Sign									PS4			PS5		PS3	
Gundam Breaker														PS3, Vita	
Guns of Icarus: Alliance	Linux	Mac		Steam					PS4			PS5			
Gwent: The Witcher Card Game			GOG	Steam					PS4			PS5			
Gwent: The Witcher Card Game					Xbox					XBO			XBSX/XBSS		
Halo Infinite				Steam	Xbox					XBO			XBSX/XBSS		
Halo: The Master Chief Collection				Steam	Xbox					XBO			XBSX/XBSS		
Halo Wars 2					Xbox					XBO			XBSX/XBSS		
Hearthstone		Mac				Battle.net	iOS	Android							
Heavy Metal Machines				Steam					PS4	XBO		PS5	XBSX/XBSS		
Hero Siege	Linux	Mac		Steam			iOS	Android			Switch				
Hero Siege	Linux	Mac		Steam			iOS	Android	PS4			PS5			
Hex				Steam					PS4			PS5			
Helldivers									PS4			PS5		PS3, Vita	
Helldivers 2				Steam								PS5	XBSX/XBSS		
Honkai Impact 3rd						Other	iOS	Android							
Hover				Steam						XBO	Switch		XBSX/XBSS		
Hover				Steam					PS4			PS5			
Human: Fall Flat					Xbox					XBO			XBSX/XBSS		
Hunt: Showdown 1896				Steam								PS5	XBSX/XBSS		
Hustle Kings														PS3, Vita	
Insurgency: Sandstorm				Steam	Xbox	Epic			PS4	XBO		PS5	XBSX/XBSS		
Invisigun Reloaded	Linux	Mac		Steam			iOS				Switch				
Invizimals: The Alliance														PS3, Vita	
Invizimals: The Lost Kingdom														PS3, Vita	
Invokers Tournament									PS4			PS5		PS3, Vita	
Jet Car Stunts														PS3, Vita	
Just Dance									PS4	XBO	Switch	PS5	XBSX/XBSS		
Kabounce				Steam					PS4			PS5			
Killer Instinct				Steam	Xbox					XBO			XBSX/XBSS		
Killer Queen Black		Mac		Steam						XBO	Switch		XBSX/XBSS		
The King of Fighters '97 Global Match									PS4			PS5		Vita	
The King of Fighters XV				Steam					PS4	XBO		PS5	XBSX/XBSS		
Knockout City				Steam		EA, Epic			PS4	XBO	Switch	PS5	XBSX/XBSS		
The Last Blade 2									PS4			PS5		Vita	
Lego Party				Steam					PS4	XBO	Switch	PS5	XBSX/XBSS		
Lethal League Blaze					Xbox					XBO			XBSX/XBSS		
LevelHead				Steam			iOS	Android			Switch				
Lightseekers		Mac		Steam			iOS	Android			Switch				
Lost Planet: Extreme Condition Colonies Edition				Steam		GFWL								XB360	
Lucadian Chronicles				Steam										Wii U	
Madden NFL 24				Steam		EA, Epic						PS5	XBSX/XBSS		
Mantis Burn Racing				Steam					PS4			PS5			
Mantis Burn Racing				Steam						XBO	Switch		XBSX/XBSS		
Marvel Rivals				Steam								PS5	XBSX/XBSS		
Marvel Tōkon: Fighting Souls				Steam								PS5			
Matchpoint: Tennis Championships				Steam	Xbox	Epic			PS4	XBO	Switch	PS5	XBSX/XBSS		
MechWarrior 5			GOG	Steam	Xbox					XBO			XBSX/XBSS		
Mecho Wars: Desert Ashes											Switch			Vita	
Metal Slug 3									PS4			PS5		PS3, Vita	
Microsoft Flight Simulator (2020)				Steam	Xbox					XBO			XBSX/XBSS		
Mindustry	Linux	Mac		Steam		Other	iOS	Android							
Minecraft: Java Edition	Linux	Mac			Xbox	Other									
Minecraft: Bedrock Edition					Xbox		iOS	Android	PS4	XBO	Switch	PS5	XBSX/XBSS		
Minecraft Dungeons				Steam	Xbox				PS4	XBO	Switch	PS5	XBSX/XBSS	Xbox Cloud Gaming	
Luanti (Formally Minetest)	Linux	Mac			Xbox		iOS	Android						WP	
Mobius Final Fantasy							iOS	Android							
Monster Hunter 3 Ultimate														3DS, Wii U	
Monster Hunter Generations Ultimate											Switch			3DS	
Monster Train			GOG	Steam	Xbox					XBO			XBSX/XBSS		
Morphies Law				Steam							Switch				
Mortal Kombat 11									PS4	XBO		PS5	XBSX/XBSS		
Mortal Kombat 1				Steam								PS5	XBSX/XBSS		
MultiVersus				Steam					PS4	XBO		PS5	XBSX/XBSS		
Mushroom Wars 2		Mac		Steam			iOS	Android			Switch				
Natural Doctrine									PS4			PS5		PS3, Vita	
NBA 2K Playgrounds 2				Steam						XBO	Switch		XBSX/XBSS		
Nickelodeon All-Star Brawl 2				Steam					PS4	XBO	Switch	PS5	XBSX/XBSS		
Nidhogg									PS4			PS5		Vita	
Need for Speed Heat				Steam		EA			PS4	XBO		PS5	XBSX/XBSS		
Need for Speed: Hot Pursuit Remastered				Steam		EA			PS4	XBO	Switch	PS5	XBSX/XBSS		
Neverwinter Nights: Enhanced Edition	Linux	Mac	GOG	Steam		Other				XBO	Switch		XBSX/XBSS		
Next Up Hero		Mac		Steam						XBO	Switch		XBSX/XBSS		
Nitroplus Blasterz: Heroines Infinite Duel									PS4			PS5		PS3	
No Man's Sky			GOG	Steam	Xbox				PS4	XBO		PS5	XBSX/XBSS		
Onigiri				Steam							Switch				
Operation: Tango				Steam		Epic			PS4	XBO		PS5	XBSX/XBSS		
Overcooked 2	Steam only	Steam only	GOG	Steam (Note: use beta channel)		Epic									
Overcooked: All You Can Eat				Steam					PS4	XBO	Switch	PS5	XBSX/XBSS		
Overload	Linux	Mac	GOG	Steam						XBO			XBSX/XBSS		
Overload	Linux	Mac	GOG	Steam					PS4			PS5			
Overwatch 2				Steam		Battle.net			PS4	XBO	Switch	PS5	XBSX/XBSS		
Paladins				Steam		Epic			PS4	XBO	Switch	PS5	XBSX/XBSS		
Pavlov VR				Steam								PS5			
Phantasy Star Online 2				Steam	Xbox	Epic			PS4	XBO	Switch	PS5	XBSX/XBSS	Vita	
Phantom Dust					Xbox					XBO			XBSX/XBSS		
Pinball FX 3				Steam					PS4			PS5			
Pinball FX 3				Steam	Xbox					XBO	Switch		XBSX/XBSS		
PixelJunk Shooter Ultimate									PS4			PS5		Vita	
PUBG: Battlegrounds									PS4	XBO		PS5	XBSX/XBSS		
PlayStation All-Stars Battle Royale														PS3, Vita	
Pokémon Unite							iOS	Android			Switch				
Power Rangers: Battle for the Grid				Steam	Xbox				PS4	XBO	Switch	PS5	XBSX/XBSS		
Project Winter				Steam					PS4	XBO	Switch		XBSX/XBSS		
Pox Nora		Mac		Steam					PS4			PS5			
Pure Chess				Steam										3DS, Wii U	
Quake	Linux			Steam	Xbox				PS4	XBO	Switch	PS5	XBSX/XBSS		
Quake II				Steam	Xbox				PS4	XBO	Switch	PS5	XBSX/XBSS		
Ragnarok Odyssey Ace														PS3, Vita	
Ratchet & Clank: Full Frontal Assault														PS3, Vita	
ReadySet Heroes				Steam					PS4			PS5			
Realm Royale				Steam		Other			PS4	XBO	Switch	PS5	XBSX/XBSS		
Rec Room				Steam			iOS	Android	PS4	XBO		PS5	XBSX/XBSS	OQ	
Remnant: From the Ashes					Xbox					XBO			XBSX/XBSS		
Remnant 2					Xbox					XBO			XBSX/XBSS		
Riptide GP: Renegade				Steam							Switch				
Riptide GP: Renegade					Xbox					XBO			XBSX/XBSS		
Risk of Rain									PS4			PS5		Vita	
Risk (SMG Studio)				Steam			iOS	Android							
Roblox		Mac			Xbox		iOS	Android	PS4	XBO		PS5	XBSX/XBSS		
Rocket Arena				Steam		EA			PS4	XBO		PS5	XBSX/XBSS		
Rocket League				Steam		Epic			PS4	XBO	Switch	PS5	XBSX/XBSS	GeForce Now	
Rogue Company				Steam		Epic			PS4	XBO	Switch	PS5	XBSX/XBSS	GeForce Now	
Samurai Shodown V Special									PS4			PS5		Vita	
Sea of Thieves				Steam	Xbox					XBO		PS5	XBSX/XBSS		
Shadowrun						GFWL								XB360	
Shadowverse				Steam			iOS	Android							
Sid Meier's Civilization V	Linux			Steam											
Siegecraft Commander		Mac		Steam					PS4			PS5			
Siegecraft Commander		Mac		Steam	Xbox					XBO	Switch		XBSX/XBSS		
Skullgirls: 2nd Encore									PS4			PS5		PS3, Vita	
SkullPirates									PS4			PS5		Vita	
Sky: Children of the Light				Steam			iOS	Android	PS4		Switch				
Smite				Steam		Epic			PS4	XBO	Switch	PS5	XBSX/XBSS		
Sniper Elite V2 Remastered					Xbox					XBO			XBSX/XBSS		
SnowRunner				Steam	Xbox	Epic			PS4	XBO	Switch		XBSX/XBSS		
Sonic Racing: CrossWorlds				Steam	Xbox						Switch	PS5	XBSX/XBSS	Switch 2	
Spacelords				Steam	Xbox				PS4	XBO		PS5	XBSX/XBSS		
Space Junkies				Steam					PS4						
Spelunky									PS4					PS3, Vita	
Spelunky 2				Steam	Xbox				PS4	XBO	Switch	PS5	XBSX/XBSS		
Spellbreak						Epic			PS4	XBO	Switch	PS5	XBSX/XBSS		
Splitgate	Linux			Steam					PS4	XBO		PS5	XBSX/XBSS		
Sports Bar VR				Steam					PS4			PS5			
StarCraft II		Mac				Battle.net									
Star Trek: Bridge Crew				Steam					PS4			PS5			
Star Wars: Hunters							iOS	Android			Switch				
Star Wars: Squadrons				Steam		EA			PS4	XBO		PS5	XBSX/XBSS		
State of Decay 2				Steam	Xbox					XBO			XBSX/XBSS		
Street Fighter V				Steam					PS4			PS5			
Street Fighter 6				Steam					PS4			PS5	XBSX/XBSS	Switch 2	
Street Fighter X Tekken														PS3, Vita	
Streets of Rage 4					Xbox					XBO			XBSX/XBSS		
Square Heroes				Steam					PS4			PS5			
Super Animal Royale		Mac		Steam					PS4	XBO	Switch	PS5	XBSX/XBSS		
Super Dungeon Bros		Mac		Steam					PS4			PS5			
Super Dungeon Bros					Xbox					XBO			XBSX/XBSS		
Super Exploding Zoo									PS4			PS5		Vita	
Super Mega Baseball 2				Steam					PS4	XBO	Switch	PS5	XBSX/XBSS		
Surviv.io	Linux	Mac			Xbox		iOS	Android							
Switch Galaxy Ultra									PS4			PS5		Vita	
Talisman: Digital Edition				Steam			iOS	Android			Switch				
Tannenberg									PS4	XBO		PS5	XBSX/XBSS		
Tekken 8				Steam								PS5	XBSX/XBSS		
Teenage Mutant Ninja Turtles: Shredder's Revenge				Steam	Xbox	Epic				XBO			XBSX/XBSS		
Terraria	Linux	Mac	GOG	Steam											
Terraria									PS4			PS5		PS3, Vita	
Terraria							iOS	Android							
Terraria										XBO			XBSX/XBSS	XB360	
Tetris Effect				Steam	Xbox	Epic			PS4	XBO	Switch	PS5	XBSX/XBSS	OQ	
Ticket to Ride	Linux	Mac	GOG	Steam			iOS	Android	PS4						
Ticket to Ride					Xbox					XBO			XBSX/XBSS		
Total War: Warhammer III	Linux	Mac		Steam	Xbox	Epic									
Touring Karts				Steam			iOS	Android	PS4		Switch	PS5			
Trailblazers	Linux	Mac	GOG	Steam					PS4			PS5			
Trailblazers	Linux	Mac	GOG	Steam						XBO	Switch		XBSX/XBSS		
Treasure Stack				Steam						XBO	Switch		XBSX/XBSS		
Trine 2		Mac	GOG	Steam		EA									
Trine 4			GOG	Steam		EA									
Tooth and Tail	Linux	Mac	GOG	Steam					PS4			PS5			
Torchlight II	Linux	Mac	GOG	Steam		Other									
Toukiden 2									PS4			PS5		PS3, Vita	
Toukiden: Kiwami									PS4			PS5		Vita	
Ultimate Chicken Horse	Linux	Mac		Steam					PS4		Switch	PS5			
Under Night In-Birth EXE:Late[st]									PS4			PS5		PS3	
Universe at War: Earth Assault				Steam		GFWL								XB360	
Unrailed!	Linux	Mac		Steam		Epic			PS4	XBO	Switch	PS5	XBSX/XBSS		
Vainglory		Mac		Steam	Xbox		iOS	Android							
Verdun									PS4	XBO		PS5	XBSX/XBSS		
Villagers & Heroes		Mac		Steam	Xbox		iOS	Android							
Virtua Fighter 5 R.E.V.O. World Stage				Steam								PS5	XBSX/XBSS	Switch 2	
Wargroove				Steam	Xbox				PS4	XBO	Switch	PS5	XBSX/XBSS		
Warhammer Age of Sigmar: Champions		Mac		Steam			iOS	Android			Switch				
Warriors Orochi 3 Ultimate									PS4			PS5		PS3, Vita	
War Thunder	Linux	Mac		Steam					PS4	XBO		PS5	XBSX/XBSS		
Warspear	Linux	Mac		Steam			iOS	Android						WP	
Warface				Steam		Epic			PS4	XBO	Switch	PS5	XBSX/XBSS	GeForce Now	
Weapons of Mythology: New Age				Steam					PS4			PS5			
Werewolves Within				Steam					PS4			PS5			
When Vikings Attack!														PS3, Vita	
Wildgate				Steam		Epic						PS5	XBSX/XBSS		
Windjammers 2				Steam	Xbox				PS4	XBO	Switch				
Windward	Linux	Mac		Steam											
Wipeout 2048														PS3, Vita	
Wipeout HD														PS3, Vita	
World of Tanks									PS4	XBO	Switch	PS5	XBSX/XBSS		
World of Warcraft		Mac				Battle.net									
World of Warships: Legends									PS4	XBO		PS5	XBSX/XBSS		
World War Z				Steam	Xbox	Epic			PS4	XBO	Switch	PS5	XBSX/XBSS		
Worms Rumble				Steam	Xbox	Epic			PS4	XBO	Switch	PS5	XBSX/XBSS		
Worms W.M.D	Linux	Mac		Steam											
WWE 2K Battlegrounds				Steam						XBO			XBSX/XBSS		
Ryū ga Gotoku Ishin!									PS4			PS5		PS3, Vita	
Yu-Gi-Oh! Duel Links				Steam			iOS	Android							
Yu-Gi-Oh! Master Duel				Steam			iOS	Android	PS4	XBO	Switch	PS5	XBSX/XBSS		
Zaccaria Pinball	Linux	Mac		Steam											
Zoo Tycoon: Ultimate Animal Collection					Xbox					XBO			XBSX/XBSS		
Zombie Army 4: Dead War				Steam	Xbox	Epic									
Zombie Tycoon 2														PS3, Vita	

== Discontinued ==
Title	XB360	XBO	XBSX/XBSS	Dreamcast	Linux	Mac	Windows PC	PS2	PS3	PS4	PS5	PSP	Vita	Switch	Others	Ref.
4x4 Evolution				Dreamcast		Mac	Windows PC									
Aero Dancing i				Dreamcast			Windows PC									
Capcom vs. SNK 2: Millionaire Fighting 2001				Dreamcast				PS2								
Dawn of the Breakers							Steam							Switch	iOS, Android	
Dead Star							Windows PC			PS4						
Dust 514							Windows PC		PS3							
Eve Online							Windows PC		PS3							
Final Fantasy XI	XB360						Windows PC	PS2								
Gigantic		XBO														
Hunt: Showdown		XBO								PS4						
Little Battlers eXperience W												PSP	Vita			
Need for Speed: Underground							Windows PC	PS2								
Overwatch Classic		XBO	XBSX/XBSS				Windows PC			PS4	PS5			Switch		
Paragon							Windows PC			PS4						
Phantasy Star Online				Dreamcast		Mac	Windows PC									
Phantasy Star Universe							Windows PC	PS2								
Portal 2					Linux	Mac	Steam		PS3							
Quake III Arena				Dreamcast			Windows PC									
Sega Swirl				Dreamcast			Windows PC									
Sparc							Windows PC			PS4						
Super Bomberman R Online		XBO					Steam			PS4				Switch	Stadia	
Uno	XB360						Windows PC									
Way of Redemption							Windows PC			PS4						

== See also ==
- Lists of video games
