= Pythia (band) =

English symphonic metal band

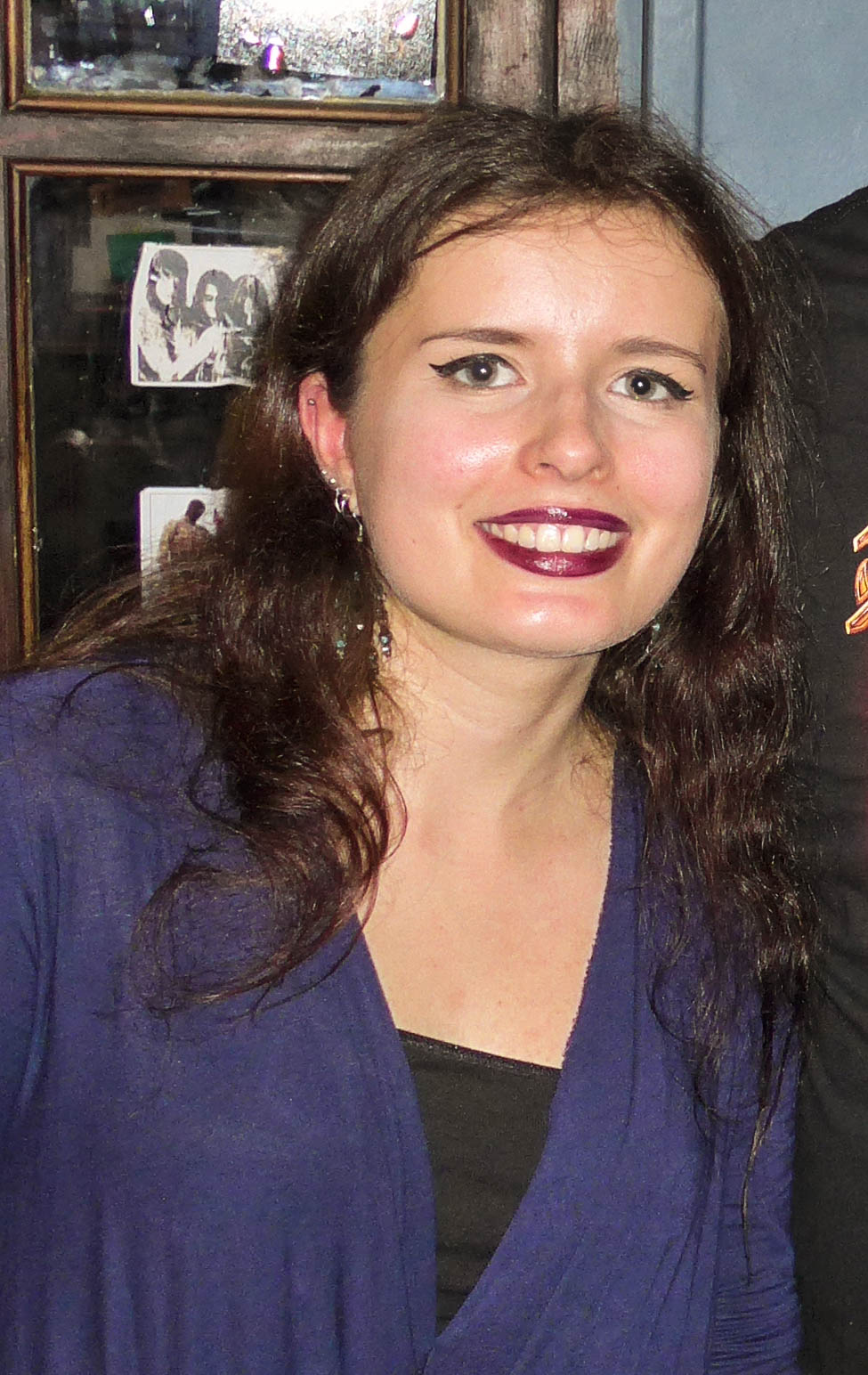
- Sophie Dorman, the band's current vocalist

Background information
- Origin: London, England
- Genres: Symphonic metal, gothic metal, power metal
- Years active: 2007–present
- Label: Golden Axe
- Members: Sophie Dorman; Marc Dyos; Ross White; Oz Wright; Marcus Matusiak; Ash Porter
- Past members: Andy Nixon-Corfield; Tim Neale; Richard Holland; Emily Alice Ovenden; Mark Harrington
- Website: www.pythiamusic.com

Pythia are an English symphonic metal band founded in London by drummer Marc Dyos, vocalist Emily Ovenden, and guitarist Ross White. Emily was also a member of Mediæval Bæbes whilst Marc and Ross had been in death/thrash metal band Descent.

The band formed in early 2007 and released their first album, Beneath the Veiled Embrace, in 2009.

In February 2012, Pythia released their second album entitled The Serpent's Curse followed by their third album "Shadows of a Broken Past" in December 2014.

In October 2015 it was announced via Facebook that Emily Alice Ovenden had left the band to focus on her new group Khronicles, and the band would continue with a new lead singer, Sophie Dorman.

== History ==
=== Early years (2007–2010) ===
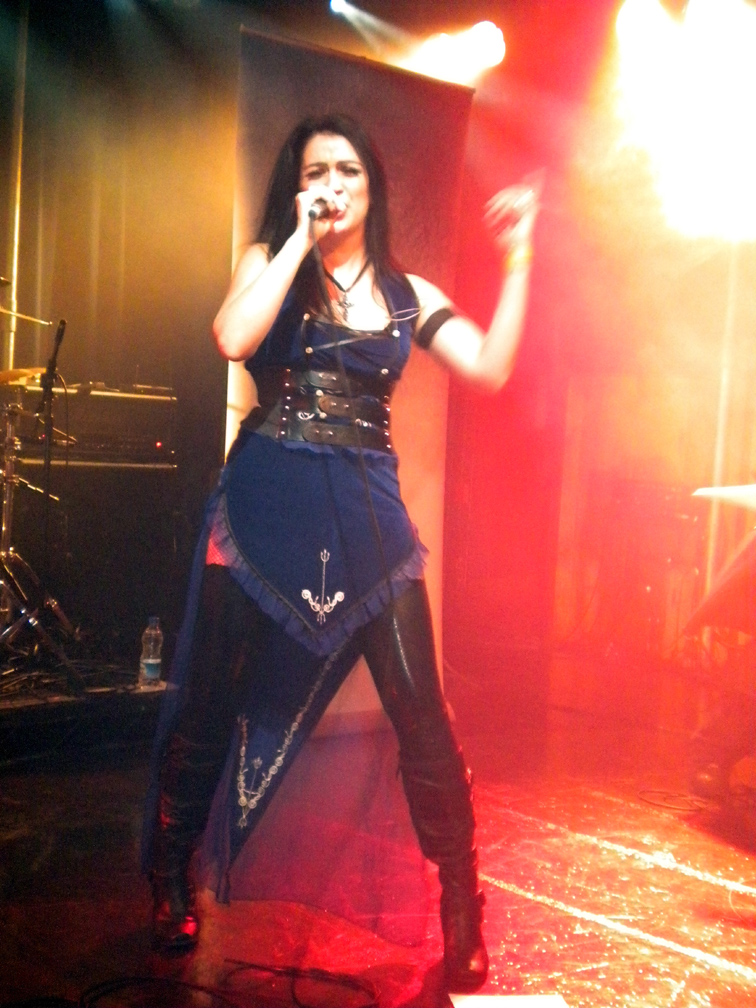
The band's first vocalist, Emily, live with the band in 2010.

Pythia was formed in London by vocalist Emily Alice Ovenden, drummer Marc Dyos, keyboardist Richard Holland, guitarists Ross White and Tim Neale, and bassist Andy Nixon-Corfield. Their debut show was as main support for Tarja at the Electric Ballroom in Camden. Their debut single "Sarah (Bury Her)" was released in August 2009, accompanied by a music video. This was shortly followed by their debut album, Beneath the Veiled Embrace released in October 2009. The album featured English actor Brian Blessed performing a spoken-word part on the song "Army of the Damned" reciting the Siegfried Sassoon poem Suicide in the Trenches. The band's live performances during this period included support slots for Arch Enemy, Ministry, Fields of the Nephilim, and a tour of Belgium and the Netherlands with Pagans Mind. Pythia performed at Bloodstock Open Air festival in August 2009, headlining the Sophie Lancaster stage, and performed on the acoustic stage earlier in the day. The band also appeared at the Prog-Power festival at Mons Expo in April 2010. On 14 May 2010 Pythia were studio guests for the Bruce Dickinson rock show on BBC 6 Music, talking to Bruce and playing a few songs from Beneath the Veiled Embrace. A music video for the second single "Army of the Damned" featured footage from the band's tour of Benelux and appearance at the Prog-Power festival.

=== The Serpent's Curse (2011–2013) ===
In 2011, the band began working on their second album titled The Serpent's Curse. During production, their bassist at the time, Andy Nixon-Corfield was replaced by Mark Harrington (from To-Mera). The album featured artwork by fantasy artist Brian Froud. Pythia announced a launch show at The Borderline for The Serpent's Curse on 29 February, followed by Cardiff and London dates on 24 and 25 March respectively supporting Serenity. Further dates for June and July 2012 were announced for London, Liverpool, Manchester and Norwich alongside Mortad. The album was released on 27 February 2012. Two singles were released from "The Serpent's Curse" - "Betray My Heart" and later a double a-side "The Circle / Just a Lie". Videos were released for both "Betrtay My Heart" and "The Circle".

In April 2013, Pythia were the main support for Sonata Arctica during their UK tour.

=== Richard and Tim's departure (2013) ===
In June 2013, Richard Holland and Tim Neale were replaced by Marcus Matusiak and Oz Wright respectively.

=== Shadows of a Broken Past and hiatus (2014–2015) ===
In January 2014, Pythia appeared as main support for symphonic metal band Leaves' Eyes during their UK tour.

The band began working on their third album in 2013, Shadows of a Broken Past. The band released a teaser soundtrack from the album called "The Key" on their YouTube channel as a promo video on 3 October 2014. Pythia also announced they would provide a free cover EP as a digital download featuring four songs covered by the band to those who pre-ordered the new album. The album was released on 8 December 2014 receiving positive reviews in core metal magazine Metal Hammer. The album again featured a spoken-word part by English actor Brian Blessed who appeared on the track "Sword of Destiny".

During the production of "Shadows of a Broken Past" Pythia reported there was some unrest within the band which caused the band to go silent. The dispute was later resolved following a statement released on their website and Facebook page. They also released the track list for Shadows of a Broken Past at that time.

On the future of Pythia Ross White was interviewed by Zero Tolerance magazine and at this time said that the band was undecided and that they were working on separate projects as well as taking parental leave for a few months.

On 1 January 2015 Emily Alice Ovenden announced that she was working on a new project with guitarist Steven Yates entitled Khronicles - a heavy rock band with folk influences. In a message on the group's Facebook page, Ross White announced that drummer Marc Dyos was continuing with session drumming, whilst Ross White would be involved in a grindcore project Lunatic Hooker.

=== Return and line-up changes (2015–present) ===
On 1 June 2015, the band released a statement on their Facebook page that Emily Alice Ovenden had left the group to focus on Khronicles full-time, and that they would be continuing with a new singer. On 6 October 2015 Pythia announced via their Facebook page that Sophie Dorman would be singing. A return to the live scene was announced with a show at the Camden Underworld in November of that year playing alongside Ancient Bards, followed by a headline show at the Boston music rooms and a support slot for Ensiferum at Islington Academy. Pythia were added to the line-up for the 2016 Muses of Metal festival headlined by Draconian (band).

On Sunday 14 August 2016, Pythia performed at Bloodstock Open Air festival, appearing on the Sophie Lancaster stage for the third time in their career.

On 19 September 2016, Pythia announced that Mark Harrington had left the band after the performance at Bloodstock, adding that his departure was due to a change of circumstances in his life and his passions were elsewhere. That announcement named Ash Porter as his replacement.

Oz Wright then left the band for family reasons, and was replaced by Jamie Hunt (ex-Biomechanical) in January 2017.

They played supports slots for Stream of Passion and The Birthday Massacre in 2017, and performed at festivals including HRH Metal in Birmingham in January and SOS Festival in Manchester in July. Throughout 2018 the band worked on the writing and recording of their next album.

They appeared at Hammerfest in March 2019, performing a number of songs from their forthcoming album 'The Solace of Ancient Earth', which was released on 17 May 2019. The album showcased a bigger and more epic sound.

In 2025 Pythia released the 5 track EP - V1 PT 1 Unhallowed and announced a launch show in London

== Musical style ==
Pythia are known for incorporating various gothic and fantasy elements into their lyrics. In the first three albums, Emily was the band's lyricist. The music style of Pythia has varied throughout their albums. Their debut album, Beneath the Veiled Embrace, went for a symphonic approach with neo-classical elements with a few faster songs such as Army of the Damned. Their 2012 album, The Serpent's Curse, also followed a similar style - heavy symphonic elements with a few fast-paced songs. Pythia changed their approach however to a much heavier, more progressive style of play with their album, Shadows of a Broken Past. The lyrical theme of this album is also somewhat different from the previous two, focusing on battles and war rather than the more gothic elements.

It features 10 tracks that see us really spreading our wings and writing some of the fastest, longest, most complex and progressive material we have ever done, yet also features some of our shortest, most melodic and catchy songs too.

— Pythia on their third album, Shadows of a Broken Past.

== Band members ==
Current

- Sophie Dorman – vocals (2015–present)
- Jamie Hunt – lead guitar (2017–present)
- Ross White – rhythm guitar (2007–present)
- Marcus Matusiak – keyboards (2013–present)
- Marc Dyos – drums (2007–present)
- Ash Porter – bass (2016–present)

Former

- Emily Ovenden – lead vocals (2007–2015)
- Tim Neale – lead guitar (2007–2013)
- Andy Nixon-Corfield – bass (2007–2011)
- Richard Holland – keyboards (2007–2013)
- Mark Harrington – bass (2011–2016)
- Oz Wright – lead guitar (2013–2016)

== Discography ==
=== Studio albums ===
- Beneath the Veiled Embrace (2009)
- The Serpent's Curse (2012)
- Shadows of a Broken Past (2014)
- The Solace of Ancient Earth (2019)

=== EP ===
- V PT 1 Unhallowed (2025)

=== Singles ===
- "Sarah (Bury Her)" (2009)
- "Army Of The Damned" (2010)
- "Betray My Heart" (2011)
- "The Circle / Just A Lie" (2012)
