= Invizimals: Shadow Zone =

2010 video game

Invisimals: Shadow Zone
- Developer: Novarama
- Publisher: Sony Computer Entertainment
- Series: Invizimals
- Platform: PlayStation Portable
- Release: PAL: 12 November 2010; NA: 25 October 2011
- Genres: Monster-taming, role-playing
- Modes: Single-player, multiplayer

Invizimals: Shadow Zone is an augmented reality role-playing video game developed by Novarama and published by Sony Computer Entertainment for the PlayStation Portable. It is the second installment in the Invizimals series and the sequel to 2009's Invizimals. As such, it is a collectible creature game, and requires the PSP's camera attachment for play. It was released on November 12, 2010 in Europe and on October 25, 2011 in North America. The game also includes a needed trap card to play but can be easily replaced by printing a new one.

A sequel entitled, Invizimals: The Lost Tribes was announced in June 2011, which was released on 4 November 2011.

== Story ==
After the events of the previous game, Kenichi Nakamura is hurt by the betrayal of Sebastian Campbell, and creates the Alliance, a group of Invizimal hunters tasked with protecting Invizimals and the world against those like Campbell who seek to exploit InviZimals for their own gain. Kenichi appoints the player as one of the Alliance's first members.

Kenichi and his friends, Jazmin Nayar and Professor Bob Dawson, meet in a Barcelona library alongside a colleague of Dawson's, Professor Alex Michaels. There, they discuss their intentions to explore the world to find new Invizimal species. Kenichi posits that Campbell may still be alive, which the others doubt.

The three of Dawson, Kenichi, and Jazmin take part in a friendly tournament that the player wins. After this, the three friends set off to explore the world, with Dawson exploring North America, Jazmin exploring eastern Asia, and Kenichi exploring parts of Northeast Africa, with the player assisting each of them along the way through their journey.

As Kenichi is exploring the base around Mount Kilimanjaro, he discovers an unusual looking Invizimal that he caught which looks like a Rattleraptor, but much more aggressive and powerful, and it is interfering with Kenichi's PSP system. While the player fights it to conduct research, the Dark Rattleraptor uses an unusual power that had never been seen before. After the battle concludes, Kenichi determines it must be dangerous, and sends it to Professor Dawson so that he can perform further experimentation. Dawson concludes that this Rattleraptor is a dark creature, a corrupted version of Rattleraptor that is much more powerful, aggressive, and dangerous to electronics.

While Professor Dawson is exploring Native American redwood forests in California, he is becoming increasingly deranged and paranoid, to the extent that he suspects people are stalking him. Dawson soon finds out that a group of local Invizimal hunters in the area have found another Dark InviZimal, and are planning to have a tournament with it as the main prize. Dawson has the player the tournament, which they eventually win, to get a second Dark InviZimal within Dawson's collection. After the tournament is over, with Dawson now having two Dark Invizimals in his collection, Dawson begins to go insane and corrupted by their presence.

While Kenichi is struggling to enter the tomb of an Egyptian pyramid, he suspects that Campbell is nearby due to Campbell's previous fascination with Egyptian mythology. Dawson makes a video call to Kenichi, warning him that the Dark Invizimals are a bad influence, with Kenichi making note of Dawson's deteriorated mental state. After the player finds a way to access the inside of the pyramid, Kenichi finds Campbell's secret base, confirming his suspicion that Campbell is still alive. Kenichi, with the help of Professor Michaels, finds Campbell's ultimate objective: to construct and open a gate at Stonehenge, allowing Dark Invizimals to enter the real world, and using them to conquer the planet. After this discovery, Kenichi is attacked by a Dark Invizimal that Campbell left behind to guard his base, which the player defeats and destroys.

Kenichi and Dawson meet up once again to get to the Stonehenge site and stop Campbell, with Dawson having recovered from his corruption. After solving a puzzle of mirrors that identifies the location of the soon-to-be shadow gate, the trio get to Stonehenge and confront Campbell. Dawson is corrupted once again by the influence of the Dark Invizimals, and falls under Campbell's command, attacking Kenichi. The player successfully defends Kenichi, defeats Dawson, and destroys Dawson's Dark Invizimal, freeing Dawson from its corruptive influence. Then, the player defeats Campbell in battle.

Although Campbell had been defeated, he stalled long enough to allow for the shadow gate to finally open, and out of the gate emerges the leader of the Dark Invizimals, a Dark Icelion. Campbell pleads with the creature to join forces with him, but the Dark Icelion refuses to cooperate with Campbell, instead dragging Campbell through the shadow gate and into the Invizimal world. Despite Campbell being gone, the gate remains open, much to Kenichi's confusion, as the Dark Icelion subtly requests that Kenichi follows it back into the Invizimal world through the shadow gate. Despite Dawson pleading with Kenichi not to enter uncharted territory, Kenichi feels it is his destiny to enter the shadow gate, and promptly enters it, devastating Dawson as the portal closes behind Kenichi.

== Development ==
The title features over 100 new creatures to collect, the ability to modify the Invizimals via name, and colour changes, as well as the ability to choose from a larger selection of attacks. Shadow Zone features a new campaign, and a co-operative capture mode.
