= Lost Kingdom =

Lost Kingdom may mean a lost land ruled by a monarchy.

Lost Kingdom or Lost Kingdoms can also refer to:

- Invizimals: The Lost Kingdom, a 2013 video game
- The Lost Kingdom (1999), a Taiwanese documentary film about a troupe during Taiwanese opera's golden age
- Lost Kingdoms, a 2002 video game
