= Reality Fighters =

2012 video game

- Developer(s): Novarama
- Publisher(s): Sony Computer Entertainment
- Platform(s): PlayStation Vita
- Release: PAL: 22 February 2012; NA: 13 March 2012
- Genre(s): Fighting
- Mode(s): Single-player, multiplayer

Reality Fighters is a 2012 fighting video game developed by Novarama and published by Sony Computer Entertainment for the PlayStation Vita.

Reality Fighters is a fighting game in which players can take photos of themselves and, using the game's editing tools, become a video game character. The game boasts over eight trillion unique fighter combinations, which can be used in solo and online play. Reality Fighters is a PlayStation Vita launch title.

== Gameplay ==
The player takes a photo of the face using the front or rear camera. Using face detection technology, the game can then recreate a character with the player's likeness. The game lets players choose the character's gender and body shape, and wear over 400 pieces of clothing. The game also allows players to choose among 15 fighting styles and over 50 weapons. Fighting styles, weapons and clothes choice affect gameplay, by unlocking new combos or modifying the damage or armor of specific body parts. For example, a helmet will better protect the head, and a pair of boots will boost kicking ability.

Reality Fighters offers two control settings. In one, the game can be played via buttons alone, with a classic control method. In the other, the game can be played via front and rear touch, which allow the player to perform all combos in a more accessible way. There are six different game modes, namely Story Mode, Survivor, Quick Fight, Time Attack, Online versus, and Boss mode. The game also supports social features of the PS Vita like online leaderboards, friend lists, or NEAR. Players can pose and take photos of their characters.

The battle interface shows a portrait of the fighter accompanied by the character's healthbar. Under the healthbar is the character's "EX Meter". When this meter is completely blue, the player can use a certain special move with the triangle button. When it is orange, the same thing happens, but this time, the player can use an even stronger move with the circle button.

== See also ==
- Invizimals, a PlayStation Portable video game by Novarama which also uses Augmented Reality.
- The Eye of Judgment, a PlayStation 3 video trading card game which uses the PlayStation Eye for similar augmented reality effects.
- Start the Party!, a PlayStation 3 party game using the PlayStation Move and Eye for augmented reality mini-games.
- Photo Dojo, a fighting game for the Nintendo DSi with a similar concept.
