= Novarama =

Spanish video game developer

Novarama Technology
- Type: Private
- Industry: Video games
- Founded: 2003
- Headquarters: Barcelona, Catalonia, Spain
- Key people: Daniel Sánchez-Crespo; Alberto Díaz; Juan Luis Abadía; Marc de Miquel; Rubén López
- Website: www.novarama.com

Novarama Technology was a video game developer based in Barcelona, Catalonia, Spain. It was notable for its Invizimals video game series.

== History ==
The studio was founded in July 2003 with the mission statement of creating innovative games with mass appeal. The studio began developing PC games, releasing Fallen Lords: Condemnation on Christmas 2005 through a local publisher. Moving into the console space, Novarama began developing Wild Summer for the PC and Xbox 360. The game was cancelled due to a publisher restructuring. Surviving the crisis with just a small core team, Novarama released Music Monstars for the Nintendo DS (known as Monster Band in the USA) in Christmas 2008, a music title for young gamers.

Novarama's most well known project is the augmented reality based Invizimals franchise, published by Sony Computer Entertainment Europe, where players need to hunt for invisible monsters around the house with the aid of a PSP and a camera, which makes them visible. The game was announced at E3 2009, showing the first game trailer and a playable demo. Invizimals was released in November 2009 across PAL territories, receiving generally positive reviews that highlighted the innovative gameplay and technology, and becoming one of the best-selling PSP games of the Christmas 2009 season across Europe. Invizimals has spawned a sequel, Invizimals: Shadow Zone, released in 2010, as well as several product lines including toys and collectible stickers.

A second sequel to Invizimals, entitled Invizimals: The Lost Tribes was announced in June 2011 for a fall release. This announcement coincided on the same day as Sony Computer Entertainment Europe announced their exclusivity agreement to all of Novarama's games in the future.

After Invizimals: The Lost Tribes, Novarama developed Reality Fighters, a PS Vita launch title. Reality Fighters is an augmented reality fighting game backed by a powerful character editor. By taking a photo of the player, the game is able to reconstruct himself as a 3D character, who can then be dressed up in millions of costume combinations. Reality Fighters was released for the PlayStation Vita on the system's launch date, February 22, 2012.

On January 23, 2013, the studio released the Invizimals: Hidden Challenges Trading Card App. The free downloadable app available on PS Vita, PSP, iOS, and Android was developed in conjunction with Panini, who released over 470 physical cards in Portugal and Spain. The application allows players to track their physical card collection, play a virtual version of the TCG, and view the monsters in augmented reality.

Shortly after, the studio confirmed that a traditional Invizimals sequel was in development for Vita, with a planned launched in late 2013. The new title had been described as being more ambitious than previous releases, and was released to tie in with the then-upcoming Invizimals animated series from BRB International.

At the end of 2016, Novarama became independent again, separating from Sony Computer Entertainment. At E3 2019, Novarama announced Killsquad, an Action RPG on PC to be released July 16, 2019.

In March 2022, Novarama announced that it had reached a deal with Tencent for the Chinese company to take a stake in Novarama.

In March 2024, Novarama declared bankruptcy. CEO Dani Sanchez-Crespo confirmed the studio closing in a video.

== Games ==
Game title	Release date	Platform(s)
Fallen Lords: Condemnation	2005	PC
Music Monstars / Monster Band	2008	Nintendo DS
Invizimals	2009	PlayStation Portable
Invizimals: Shadow Zone	2010	PlayStation Portable
Invizimals: The Lost Tribes	2011	PlayStation Portable
Reality Fighters	2012	PlayStation Vita
Invizimals: Hidden Challenges Trading Card App	2013	PlayStation Vita, PlayStation Portable, iOS, Android
Invizimals: The Alliance	2013	PlayStation Vita
Invizimals: The Lost Kingdom	2013	PlayStation 3
Invizimals: The Resistance	2014	PlayStation Vita
Killsquad	2019	PC
Samurai Jack: Battle Through Time	2020	iOS
United 1944	2024	PC

== Awards ==
- Invizimals. Special Achievement for Innovation, IGN.com Best of E3 2009, winner.
- Invizimals. Special Achievement for Technological Excellence, IGN.com Best of E3 2009, winner.
- Invizimals. Game of the Show, IGN.com Best of E3 2009, runner-up, lost to LittleBigPlanet.d
- Premi Ciutat de Barcelona 2009, Technological Innovation, for Invizimals.
- Invizimals. Best Overall Game. Gamelab Spanish National Video Game Awards 2010, winner.
- Invizimals. Best Technology. Gamelab Spanish National Video Game Awards 2010, winner.
- Invizimals: Shadow Zone. Best Handheld Game. Gamelab Spanish National Video Game Awards 2011, winner.
