= Suicide in the Trenches =

1918 war poem by Siegfried Sassoon

"Suicide in the Trenches" is one of the many war poems the English poet Siegfried Sassoon composed in response to World War I, reflecting his own service in the conflict. Sassoon was an upper-class officer who eventually opposed the war, but he never lost his admiration for the common soldiers who had to fight it. It was first published 23 February 1918 in Cambridge Magazine, then in Sassoon's collection: Counter-Attack and Other Poems. The poem is written in iambic tetrameter and consists of twelve lines in three stanzas.

The poem exemplifies the sensibility of war poets in "avoid[ing] sentimentality and self-pity while describing the realities of war". It tells of the suicide of a young man sent off to war and attacks the "'smug-faced' crowds who greet the returning soldiers". This is one of the poems referenced when Copp states, "It was with poems like these that Sassoon, more than any other trench poet writing in English, brought home to an uninformed public the true reality of the ghastly nature of the war."

== Cultural references ==
In 2009, Brian Blessed read the poem within the song "Army of the Damned", part of the album Beneath the Veiled Embrace by the band Pythia.

Carl Barât of English rock band The Libertines set this poem to music and used it to teach bandmate Pete Doherty guitar. The duo recited it as their 2004 NME Awards speech, and occasionally perform it live. A version of the song, titled 'Christmas Time', appears on Up the Bracket: Demos, Radio Sessions, B-Sides & Live.

In Nathaniel Ian Miller's novel The Memoirs of Stockholm Sven, the main character believes the poem has the "subtlety of a broad-axe".

Alice Winn's novel In Memoriam drew on the poem for inspiration of a character's suicide in the trenches of WWI.
