= Brian Blessed =

English actor (born 1936)

Brian Blessed OBE
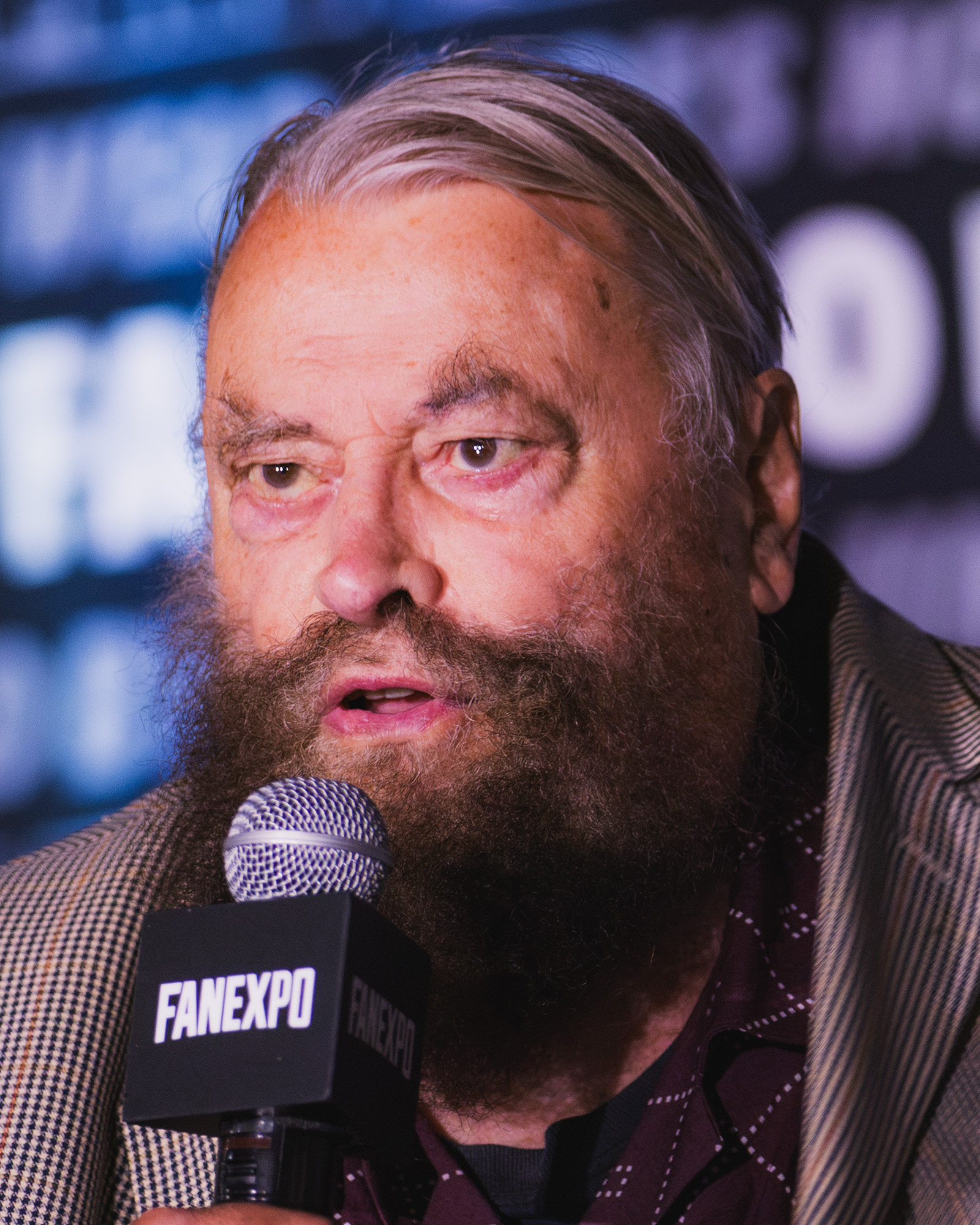
- Blessed in 2026
- Born: 9 October 1936 (age 90); Mexborough, West Riding of Yorkshire, England
- Education: Bristol Old Vic Theatre School (BA)
- Occupations: Actor; presenter; writer; explorer
- Years active: 1956–present
- Works: Filmography
- Spouses: Ann Bomann (divorced); Hildegarde Neil (m. 1978; died 2023)
- Children: 2

Brian Blessed (/ˈblɛsɪd/ BLES-id; born 9 October 1936) is an English actor. He is known for his distinctive bushy beard, loud booming voice, and exuberant personality and performances. He portrayed PC "Fancy" Smith in Z-Cars; Augustus in the 1976 BBC television production of I, Claudius; Prince Vultan in Flash Gordon; Bustopher Jones and Old Deuteronomy in the 1981 original London production of Cats at the New London Theatre; King Richard IV in the first series of Blackadder; Thomas Beaufort, Duke of Exeter, in Henry V; Boss Nass in Star Wars: Episode I – The Phantom Menace; and the voice of Clayton and the Tarzan yell in Disney's Tarzan.

In 2016, Blessed was appointed Officer of the Order of the British Empire (OBE) for services to the arts and charity.

== Early life and education ==
Blessed was born on 9 October 1936 at Montagu Hospital in Mexborough, West Riding of Yorkshire, the son of William Blessed, a socialist coal miner at Hickleton Main Colliery (and himself the son of a coal miner) and cricketer for the Yorkshire second team, and Hilda (née Wall). He had a brother, Alan, seven years younger, and the pair "went everywhere together" when they were growing up. Alan Blessed died from leukaemia aged 52; their mother died aged 87, and their father died aged 99. Blessed's great-great-grandfather, Jabez Blessed, was the father of 13 children and worked as a china and glass dealer in Brigg, Lincolnshire; many of Blessed's relatives hail from Brigg.

Blessed went to Bolton on Dearne Secondary Modern School, where he was the school boxing champion and captain of the football and cricket teams. When he was 14, his father was involved in a mining accident and endured a long and painful recovery; his mother then suffered a nervous breakdown and had to go to hospital for electric shock treatment, which forced him to leave school and find work as an undertaker's assistant and, later, as a plasterer. He then completed his national service in the RAF Regiment, in Bicester, before winning a scholarship to study drama at the Bristol Old Vic Theatre School in 1956.

== Career ==
=== Acting ===
One of Blessed's earliest roles was that of PC "Fancy" Smith in the BBC television series Z-Cars, between 1962 and 1965. In 1966, he appeared in a production of Incident at Vichy at the Phoenix Theatre in London. Also in 1966, he was offered the titular role of the Doctor in BBC's sci-fi drama, Doctor Who, to take over from William Hartnell, but had to turn it down due to conflicting projects. In 1967, he played Porthos in a 10-part BBC adaptation of The Three Musketeers. Blessed also had minor roles in cult TV series such as The Avengers (1967, 1969) and the original Randall and Hopkirk (Deceased) (1969). He interpreted the role of King Mark of Cornwall in the HTV television series Arthur of the Britons (1972–1973). He appeared as William Woodcock in the Yorkshire Television series Boy Dominic (1974). He played Caesar Augustus in the BBC Two drama series I, Claudius (1976), Vargas in the Blake's 7 episode Cygnus Alpha (1978) and Basileos in The Aphrodite Inheritance (1979). He hosted a docudrama on the life of Johann Sebastian Bach called The Joy of Bach (1978), in which he also played Bach in a number of scenes.

Blessed also appeared in two episodes of the British science fiction television series Space: 1999. He played scientist Dr Cabot Rowland in the 1975 episode "Death's Other Dominion" and Mentor in the 1976 episode "The Metamorph".

Blessed played Long John Silver in the 10-part serial Return to Treasure Island (1986), King Yrcanos in the Doctor Who serial Mindwarp (1986), General Yevlenko in the mini-series War and Remembrance (1988), and Lord Loxley, the father of Robin Hood, in the Hollywood film Robin Hood: Prince of Thieves (1991).

In 1981, Blessed appeared in Andrew Lloyd Webber's musical, Cats, as both Old Deuteronomy and Bustopher Jones, for the original West End theatre production.

Blessed has appeared in a number of Shakespearean roles on both stage and screen, including four of the five Shakespeare films directed by Kenneth Branagh: as the Duke of Exeter in Henry V (1989), Antonio in Much Ado About Nothing (1993), the Ghost of Hamlet's Father in Hamlet (1996), and both Duke Frederick and Duke Senior in As You Like It (2006).

In comedies, Blessed portrayed Prince Vultan in the film Flash Gordon (1980); the mad, comical figure of Richard IV in the first series of The Black Adder (1983), a role Blessed has claimed to be one of his most cherished; and Spiro Halikiopoulos in the TV mini-series My Family and Other Animals (1987), a BBC adaptation of Gerald Durrell's book by the same name. Blessed has joked that he was due to appear in Blackadder II (1986) as Elizabeth I, but was unavailable for filming. In 1989, he made an appearance in the comedy/drama Minder, as Detective Inspector Freddie Dyer of the Serious Crime Squad in the episode The Last Video Show.

In 1997, Blessed portrayed Squire Western in the BBC adaptation of Henry Fielding's 1749 comic novel Tom Jones. He later recalled accidentally punching Peter Capaldi whilst filming and said of the event, "I thought I'd killed the poor bastard."

In 1999, Blessed provided both the voice and live-action reference for the CGI character Boss Nass in Star Wars: Episode I – The Phantom Menace which he reprised in the 2022 video game Lego Star Wars: The Skywalker Saga, and also provided the voice of the villainous hunter Clayton in Disney's animated feature film Tarzan, a role he later reprised in the video game based on the film and in the critically acclaimed Kingdom Hearts in 2002; he also did the Tarzan yell after Tony Goldwyn was unable to do it himself. He voiced "Sir Morris" in the 1999 cartoon series The Big Knights. He read the story "The White City" for the album series Late Night Tales, recording it in four parts released over four albums, and was also the voice of Jean Valjean in Focus on the Family Radio Theatre's audio adaptation of Victor Hugo's Les Misérables. Blessed was one of the narrators for Story Teller, a children's magazine partwork series in the 1980s. He has further provided vocal links for the Sony-Award-winning Christian O'Connell Breakfast Show on Virgin Radio, and introduced advertisements for Orange mobile phones.

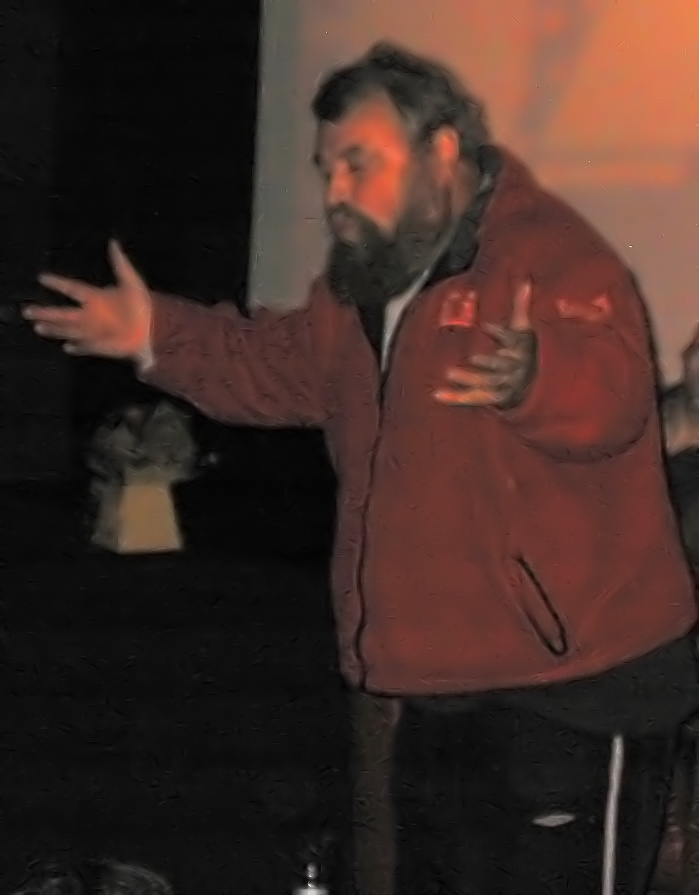
Blessed at the Cambridge Film Festival in 2007

In 2002, under the direction of Royal Shakespeare Company director Adrian Noble, he originated the role of Baron Bomburst for the stage musical version of Chitty Chitty Bang Bang. From December 2005 to January 2006, Blessed headlined the Christmas pantomime production of Peter Pan, alongside CBBC presenter Kirsten O'Brien, at Ipswich's Regent Theatre. From 2007 to 2008, he appeared in the same play as Captain Hook at the Grove Theatre in Dunstable; he reprised the role for the Christmas 2008 season at the Fairfield Halls, Croydon. For Christmas 2006, he presented a production of Cinderella for Virgin Radio, starring David Tennant, Thandiwe Newton and others.

Since October 2008, Blessed has presented the English-language dub of the Japanese TV game show Unbeatable Banzuke on Challenge, under the pseudonym "Banzuke Brian". He was the narrator of the Sky 1 series Crash Test Dummies, starring Steve Marsh and Dan Wright. In animation, he has provided the voices of Bob in Kika & Bob (2008) and Grampy Rabbit in Peppa Pig (2004–present).

In 2009 Blessed starred with his wife, Hildegarde Neil, in the short film Mr Bojagi.

Following a Facebook campaign, satellite navigation manufacturer TomTom recorded Blessed's voice for use in its products; he has been available as a voice command option since October 2010. In September 2010, Blessed recorded the voice of Great Sultan Shahryār for Sheherazade, or The Princess, the Pirate and the Baboon!, an album of children's stories set to Nikolai Rimsky-Korsakov's classical music composition Scheherazade, co-starring Rory Bremner and released as an instalment of Grandma Dingley's Ingeniously Musical Tales in 2011.

In 2018, Blessed voiced German military engineer Konrad Kyeser in the open-world medieval RPG, Kingdom Come: Deliverance. He voiced the megalomaniacal Red Ivan in the 2021 base building game Evil Genius 2: World Domination.

In 2019, Blessed voiced Gotrek Gurnisson in the Total War: Warhammer video game series.

=== Music ===
In 2009, Blessed featured in the song "Army of the Damned" from the album Beneath the Veiled Embrace by British power metal band Pythia, reciting the poem "Suicide in the Trenches" by Siegfried Sassoon. Blessed also appeared on their 2014 album Shadows of a Broken Past.

Blessed had previously contributed to the song "The Joust" by Christian band Eden Burning in 1994.

Blessed contributed vocals to the track 'Sonic Attack' on the 2015 Hawkwind album 'Space Ritual Live'.

In 2017, Blessed was featured in "If you remember" music video, singles from British indie band, The Ramona Flowers. As of November 2024, the video had reached over 725,000 views. It is also his first appearance in a music video and called it a "great adventure". The music video was directed by Roger Sargent and produced by Connor Simmons.

Blessed contributed to the spoken word intro track 'The Prophecy' from Saxon's 2024 album Hell, Fire and Damnation.

=== Other work ===
Blessed has completed 800 hours of space training at Star City in Russia.

Blessed served as President of the Television and Radio Industries Club (TRIC) from 2007 to 2008 and presented the 2008 TRIC Awards at Grosvenor House, London.

In 2004, Blessed appeared on and won an episode of Celebrity Stars in Their Eyes, impersonating the opera singer Luciano Pavarotti. He appeared as an expert and commentator on the satellite channel UKTV G2 during the 2006 World Cup. Blessed also appeared on A Question of Sport in 2006 and 2011, and was a guest host on the BBC's satirical quiz show Have I Got News for You in May 2008 and April 2013 (also making a surprise appearance in the 2008 Christmas special).

Downloadable content for the computer game War of the Roses featured narration by Blessed. In 2013, he received the Spirit of Hammer Award at the Metal Hammer magazine's Golden Gods Awards.

On 14 August 2014, Blessed was the subject of an episode of the BBC documentary series Who Do You Think You Are?, tracing the lives of his ancestors.

In October 2016 the BBC broadcast a 3-hour compilation of interviews with Blessed, Brian Blessed's Radio Adventures, featuring interviews with him where he discusses his life and career.

== Expeditions and adventures ==
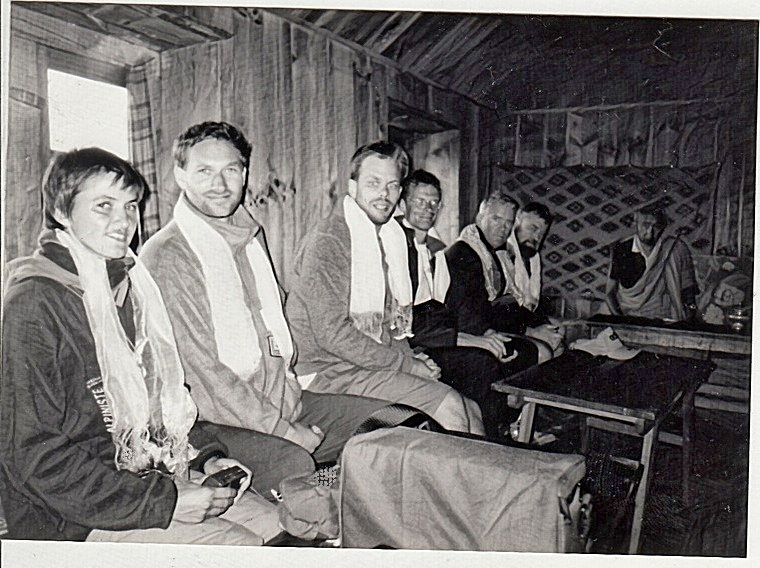
Everest climbers receive Tengboche Monastery blessings from Ngawang Tenzing Jangpo. Blessed is the bearded figure, second from right.

Blessed has attempted to climb Mount Everest three times without supplemental oxygen, reaching heights of 28,200 feet (8,600 m) in 1993 and 25,200 feet (7,700 m) in 1996, but without reaching the summit.

Blessed has reached the summits of Aconcagua in Argentina and Kilimanjaro in Tanzania, and has undertaken an expedition into the jungles of Venezuela, during which he survived a plane crash.

Blessed is the oldest man to have reached the North Magnetic Pole on foot, where he says he punched a polar bear on the nose.

== Personal life ==
In 1963, Blessed, then in his late 20s, assisted a mother giving birth in Richmond Park, London. He delivered the healthy baby girl, then bit through the umbilical cord. He later recounted, "I was covered in blood, my shirt was covered in blood, I was wrapping her, wiping her, [saying] 'it's all right, darling'.... And I was licking the baby's face."

Blessed's first marriage was to the American actress and Egyptologist Ann Bomann, whom he met in Bristol. They had a daughter together but later divorced. Blessed was then married to actress Hildegarde Neil from 1978 until Neil's death in 2023. They have a daughter, who has acted with her father onstage.

Blessed lives in Windlesham, Surrey. He owns several dogs and is a patron of the charity Pet Respect. In 2011, he became a patron for Hopefield Animal Sanctuary in Brentwood, Essex.

Blessed holds a black belt in judo.

=== Health ===
Blessed suffered a nervous breakdown at age 18. He eventually recovered with the support of friends, family, and his speech teacher.

On 19 January 2015, Blessed collapsed on stage during a performance of King Lear with the Guildford Shakespeare Company, in which his daughter Rosalind was also acting. He received medical attention from a doctor in the audience and returned to the stage to complete the play 20 minutes later. On 30 January 2015, it was announced that Blessed had been "compelled to withdraw" from the production on the advice of his heart specialist. He has been fitted with a pacemaker.

=== Honours ===
He has honorary degrees from the University of Bradford (awarded July 2003) and Sheffield Hallam University (awarded 2004) and has also been awarded the honorary title of "Official Shoutsperson" by the University of York's Douglas Adams Society.

In 2011, the student union at the University of York voted to name a new study area the "Brian Blessed Centre for Quiet Study". The same year, Blessed was nominated for the post of chancellor of the University of Cambridge, following a campaign by graduates. He was later awarded Honorary Membership of the Cambridge Union in recognition of his nomination.

Blessed was appointed Officer of the Order of the British Empire (OBE) in the 2016 Birthday Honours for services to the arts and charity.

== Bibliography ==
- The Turquoise Mountain: Brian Blessed on Everest (1991) ISBN 9780747510468
- The Dynamite Kid (1992) ISBN 9780747512752
- Nothing's Impossible (1994)
- To the Top of the World (1995) ISBN 9780831732981
- Quest for the Lost World (1999)
- Absolute Pandemonium (2015) ISBN 9781447292975
- The Panther in My Kitchen: My Wild Life with Animals (2017) ISBN 9781509841592
