= Invizimals: The Lost Kingdom =

2013 adventure video game

- Developer(s): Novarama; Magenta Software
- Publisher(s): Sony Computer Entertainment
- Series: Invizimals
- Platform(s): PlayStation 3
- Release: PAL: 30 October 2013; NA: 30 September 2014
- Genre(s): Platform
- Mode(s): Single-player, multiplayer

Invizimals: The Lost Kingdom is a platform video game developed by Novarama and Magenta Software and published by Sony Computer Entertainment for the PlayStation 3. A spin-off of the Invizimals series, it was released on 30 October 2013 in Europe simultaneously with Invizimals: The Alliance.

== Reception ==
The game has a score of 50% on Metacritic.
