= Warspear Online =

2008 video game

- Engine: Mobile Dragon
- Platforms: iOS, Android, Mac OS X, Windows, Windows Phone, Linux
- Release: RUS: June 12, 2008; WW: 2011
- Genre: MMORPG
- Mode: Multiplayer

Warspear Online is a mobile cross-platform massively multiplayer online role-playing game (MMORPG). It supports different mobile platforms: iOS, Android, Windows Mobile, Symbian and Windows based PCs and laptops. First launch of the game was in 2008 and it was based on P2P model, in 2010 it was redesigned. In March, 2011 an update called Legacy of Berengar was launched. The game became F2P.

As of 2011, it is available in Russian, English and Vietnamese languages. Warspear Online became the winner in category “Best Multiplayer Game 2013” hosted by Best App Ever Awards.

Prehistory of Warspear Online tells us about divine Spear which kept balance in the world Arinar. But a powerful serpent Garahan once decided to seize the Spear to get more power to rule the whole world. And the War for Spear began caused by the greed for power.

== Servers ==
Seven servers are available:

- EU-Emerald - for European players
- RU-Topaz, RU-Amber, RU-Ruby - for Russian players
- SA-Pearl - for Southeast Asian players
- US-Sapphire - for American players
- BR-Tourmaline - for Brazilian players
