= Invizimals: The Alliance =

2013 video game

- PAL version cover art
- Developer(s): Novarama
- Publisher(s): Sony Computer Entertainment
- Series: Invizimals
- Platform(s): PlayStation Vita
- Release: PAL: 30 October 2013; NA: 30 September 2014
- Genre(s): Monster-taming, role-playing
- Mode(s): Single-player, multiplayer

Invizimals: The Alliance is an augmented reality role-playing video game developed by Novarama and published by Sony Computer Entertainment for the PlayStation Vita. It is the fourth installment in the Invizimals series and the first to not be released for the PlayStation Portable. It features cross-play multiplayer interactivity with the PlayStation 3 title Invizimals: The Lost Kingdom. It was released on October 30, 2013, in Europe simultaneously with Invizimals: The Lost Kingdom. The game was first announced in 2013 alongside Invizimals: The Lost Kingdom.

Gameplay involves locating and capturing creatures called Invizimals who have escaped into the real world, and integrates the Vita's hardware, including the touch controls, camera, and microphone, into the gameplay. After catching the Invizimals, the player then uses them to battle in tournaments against other Invizimals. The game utilizes augmented reality via the Vita's camera pointed at AR cards placed on a flat surface to show the Invizimal monters. The game features numerous cutscenes with actors including Brian Blessed.

In addition to crossplay with the PS3 game The Lost Kingdom, the game also interacts with Invizimals animated series by unlocking content when the player scans stickers shown on the show.

The game has a score of 69 on Metacritic.
