= Go!Cam =

Peripheral camera for the PlayStation Portable

The PSP Camera is a digital camera peripheral by Sony Computer Entertainment for the PlayStation Portable handheld video game system. In Japan, the PSP-300 was released as the Chotto Shot (ちょっとショット; "Quick Shot") on November 2, 2006, and was released in Singapore in the same year. For PAL regions, it is named the Go!Cam and was released May 25, 2007. A lower resolution version, the PSP-450x, was introduced in 2009. The PSP-450x camera was released in North America bundled with Invizimals on October 12, 2010, and was also bundled with EyePet on November 2, 2010.

The camera mounts on top of the PSP via the Mini USB connection slot and a screw. It can take still photographs and record video with audio. The microphone can also be used with the Talkman program and others.

== PSP-300 E ==
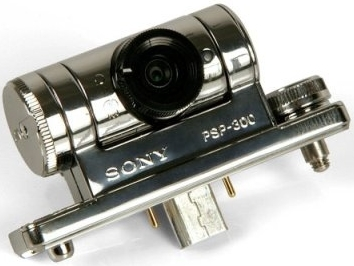
Sony PSP Go!Cam (PSP-300)

The PSP-300 E is a silver 1.3 megapixel camera, similar to cameras found in cellular phones. It can record video at up to 480×272 at 30 frames/s and take photographs at up to 1280×960. It requires Official Firmware 2.82 or later.

PSP-300 E
Photo resolutions	Video resolutions
320×240 (QVGA)	320×240 15 frames/s
320×240 (QVGA)	320×240 30 frames/s
480×272	480×272 15 frames/s
480×272	480×272 30 frames/s
640×480 (VGA)
1280×960 (SXGA)

== PSP-450x ==
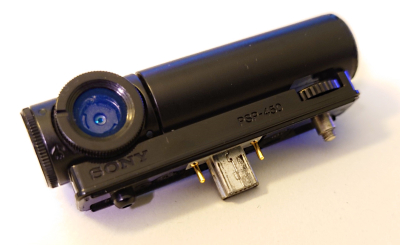
Sony PSP Go!Cam (PSP-450)

On November 13, 2009, when Invizimals was released, it came bundled with a new, redesigned PSP camera, model PSP-450x, which is a 0.3-megapixel camera taking photographs at a maximum resolution of 640×480 and video at up to 480×272 at 30 frames/s. The PSP-450x requires Official Firmware 6.00 or later.

PSP-450x
Photo resolutions	Video resolutions
320×240 (QVGA)	320×240 15 frames/s
320×240 (QVGA)	320×240 30 frames/s
480×272	480×272 15 frames/s
480×272	480×272 30 frames/s
640×480 (VGA)

== Editing software ==
The Chotto Shot camera comes with a UMD used to edit photos and video clips, though the UMD is in Japanese, so non-Japanese users who imported it might have difficulty using the software.

The Go!Cam camera does not come with a UMD but instead has an available download for it called Go!Edit. Go!Edit is a program that enables extended usage of the Go!Cam and includes features that enable pictures and videos to be edited. Go!Edit requires PSP system firmware of 3.40 or above to be used. Aside from English, the Go!Edit program is also available in Danish, Dutch, Spanish, Italian, French, Suomi (Finnish), Norwegian, Portuguese, and Swedish, and all the languages are packaged with the program itself.

The PSP camera can use firmware version 3.00 or higher to take photographs or videos with English on-screen instructions. Users can do so by selecting "CAMERA" under the "PHOTO" menu. Once taken, the photo or video will then be saved to the user's Memory Stick. Saved videos can be uploaded to the Internet from any wireless connection.

== Video recording length ==
Go!Edit videos can only be taken for a length of 15 seconds and then edited; however, accessing the camera through the XMB menu means the video recording length depends on the size of the Memory Stick. Video quality can be changed, so the lower the quality, the longer the recording time and vice versa. Using the best quality setting (480×272 and Fine quality), one-and-a-half hours of video can be recorded on a 4 GB Memory Stick Duo.
