= Invizimals (video game) =

2009 video game

- Developer: Novarama
- Publisher: Sony Computer Entertainment
- Series: Invizimals
- Platform: PlayStation Portable
- Release: PAL: 13 November 2009; NA: 12 October 2010
- Genres: Monster-taming, role-playing
- Modes: Single-player, multiplayer

Invizimals is an augmented reality role-playing video game developed by Novarama and published by Sony Computer Entertainment for the PlayStation Portable (PSP). It is the first entry in the Invizimals series, and was bundled with the PSP's camera attachment at launch.

== Gameplay ==
The gameplay of Invizimals has been compared to the Pokémon series, involving players capturing and raising different species of creatures, and allowing the player to battle with them, either against an AI or with others using the PSP's wireless abilities. Unlike Pokémon, however, Invizimals requires the player to hunt and capture these creatures within the real world, using the concept of augmented reality, a camera attachment for the PlayStation Portable, and a physical "trap" – a square-shaped device used as a fiduciary marker. These monsters are spawned at different environments (determined by colors of surfaces and time of day), and the trap is used to capture the monsters. Once captured, players are able to raise and level-up their monsters using "Watts" and allow them to learn different attacks of 6 different elements: Fire, Water, Earth (rock), Forest (jungle), Ice, and Desert. Players can also use the trap to view their monsters, and take pictures of their collection. Sparks, which are orb-like items, can be used to purchase power-ups in an in-game store. Mutant Invizimals can be found, which come in different colours and skills compared to their ordinary Invizimal counterparts. "Secret Invizimals" can only be captured when connecting to online multiplayer.

== Story ==
The story follows Kenichi Nakamura, a researcher at PSP R&D in Tokyo. He has discovered invisible animals, which he dubs Invizimals. Invizimals are only visible using an attached PSP camera and pointing it at a device called the trap. Kenichi's life is devoted to finding Invizimals and furthering the understanding of them. Only specific people have the aura necessary to see these Invizimals, even among those with access to the same equipment, and Kenichi detects that the player is one of these few people.

Kenichi's most trusted colleague, Professor Bob Dawson, assists Kenichi in his research and teaches the player the basics of Invizimal combat. Dawson discovers that Invizimals are made of energy, specifically light, and that the light particles that they emit in battle – sparks, as Dawson calls them – can be used as a currency in the Invizimal world. After being taught the basics of Invizimal combat, the player hones their skills and trains their Invizimals across various Invizimal fighting clubs around the world.

Kenichi's boss asks him to meet a business associate of his located in Mumbai, India, and that Kenichi take vital research data about Invizimals with him. After Kenichi disembarks the plane and leaves the airport, he is kidnapped by an unknown man. Kenichi's good friend Jazmin Nayar notifies the player that she could not find Kenichi who was scheduled to meet with her. The unknown man interrogated Kenichi, as the unknown man had knowledge of Invizimals. Kenichi said nothing in the interrogation and hid the crucial thumb drive with his research data on it; he was eventually let go. After this incident, Kenichi's boss reached an arrangement with another associate of his, Sir Sebastian Campbell, to have Kenichi transferred to the Campbell Castle in England to give Kenichi a safe place to further conduct his research.

After having met Campbell, the player is invited to a tournament in Berlin attended by many of Campbell's colleagues. After winning the tournament, the player sits down to have dinner with Rolf, the champion of the Berlin club that the player defeated in the tournament. Rolf asks the player to find his favorite Invizimal for him, and, in return, Rolf gives the player a mutant Invizimal, an Invizimal that is more powerful than its counterparts.

Kenichi and Jazmin continue their research in the Campbell Castle. Kenichi comes to the conclusion that Invizimals can be used as a source of electricity, and is conducting experiments to see how to make use of this. In one of his experiments, Kenichi causes the castle's power grid to go out. During the blackout, Kenichi and Jazmin are attacked in a kidnapping plot; Kenichi is kidnapped, but Jazmin managed to escape, sustaining a serious arm injury in the process, and was transferred to Windsor Hospital to heal. After this, Dawson's library was vandalized, destroying much of Dawson's Invizimal research data.

Campbell notifies the player of a criminal that he suspects engineered the kidnapping plot: Axel Kaminsky, a Russian arms dealer and international terrorist with extensive knowledge of Invizimals. The player gets in contact with Kaminsky, who confirms that he has kidnapped Kenichi. After paying a ransom of sparks, the player is allowed into Kaminsky's secret lair, the Viper's Nest, an underground tunnel in Russia where Kenichi is kept hostage. After a brief introduction, Dawson and Jazmin manage to temporarily hijack Kaminsky's signal to warn the player of Kaminsky, as he is an incredibly powerful Invizimal battler who has never been defeated. After Kaminsky regains the signal, he challenges the player to a battle.

After the player wins and defeats Kaminsky, Kenichi is freed. Before they can escape the Viper's Nest, Campbell and his security storm the Viper's Nest, where it is revealed that Campbell was the one after the Invizimals all along. Campbell hired Kaminsky to carry out his work in attempting to steal all Invizimal knowledge for himself. After revealing his true intentions, Campbell challenges the player to a final showdown, which Campbell loses. After having lost the battle, Kenichi and Campbell enter a brief struggle, during which, Kenichi's damaged PSP system begins to glow brilliantly. With Campbell holding Kenichi's PSP in his hand, a large energy explosion is generated, and Campbell is gone, presumably vaporized by the blast. Kenichi and the player leave the Viper's Nest relatively unscathed.

== Reception ==
Reception

Aggregate score
Aggregator	Score
Metacritic	69/100

Review scores
Publication	Score
Edge	5/10
Eurogamer	7/10
GamePro	3/5
GameRevolution	D
GamesMaster	71%
GameSpot	6/10
GameZone	7.5/10
IGN	(US) 7.5/10 (UK) 7/10
PlayStation: The Official Magazine	8/10
VideoGamer.com	7/10

Invizimals received "average" reviews according to the review aggregation website Metacritic.

The game received numerous awards, among which are:

- Special Achievement for Innovation, IGN Best of E3 2009, winner.
- Special Achievement for Technological Excellence, IGN Best of E3 2009, winner.
- Game of the Show, IGN Best of E3 2009, runner-up, lost to LittleBigPlanet.
- Best New Gameplay Mechanic, Kotaku Best of E3 2009, runner-up, lost to Scribblenauts.
- Best PSP Game, Kotaku Best of E3 2010, runner-up, lost to God of War: Ghost of Sparta.
- Ciutat de Barcelona Award 2009 in the category of Technical Innovation, awarded from the city's Mayor Office to individuals and companies with outstanding contributions to the culture of the city of Barcelona.
- El Duende cultural magazine award. Category: Technology and Video games.
- Spanish National Videogame Awards 2010. Best Technology.
- Spanish National Videogame Awards 2010. Best Overall Game.
