= Invizimals =

Video game series

- Logo
- Genre: Action
- Developers: Novarama; Magenta Software
- Publisher: Sony Interactive Entertainment
- Platforms: PlayStation Portable; PlayStation 3 PlayStation Vita iOS; Android
- First release: Invizimals: EU: 13 November 2009; NA: 10 October 2010
- Latest release: Invizimals: Battle of the Hunters: WW: 22 January 2016

Invizimals is an augmented reality video game franchise developed by Novarama and owned by Sony Interactive Entertainment. The series, which originally began in 2009 as a video game on PSP, has since inspired toys, trading cards, comics and an animated television series telling an interconnected transmedia story.

== Games ==
=== Invizimals ===
Invizimals is a PlayStation Portable augmented reality video game developed by Novarama, and published by Sony Computer Entertainment Europe. It is a collectible creature game, and was bundled with the PSP's camera attachment on launch.

=== Invizimals: Shadow Zone ===
Invizimals: Shadow Zone is a PlayStation Portable augmented reality video game developed by Novarama, and published by Sony Computer Entertainment Europe. It is the sequel to 2009's Invizimals. As such, it is a collectible creature game, and requires the PSP's camera attachment for play. It was released on 12 November 2010, in Europe and on 25 October 2011 in North America. The game also includes a needed trap card to play but can be easily replaced by printing a new one.

=== Invizimals: The Lost Tribes ===
Invizimals: The Lost Tribes is a PlayStation Portable augmented reality video game developed by Novarama and published by Sony Computer Entertainment Europe. It is the sequel to 2009's Invizimals, and 2010's Invizimals: Shadow Zone. As such, it is a collectible creature game, and requires the PSP's camera attachment for play. It was released in November 2011 in Europe and September 2014 in North America.

=== Invizimals: The Alliance ===
Invizimals: The Alliance is an augmented reality video game for the PlayStation Vita. It features cross-play multiplayer interactivity with the PlayStation 3 title Invizimals: The Lost Kingdom. It was released on 30 October 2013 in Europe simultaneously with Invizimals: The Lost Kingdom.

=== Invizimals: The Lost Kingdom ===
Invizimals: The Lost Kingdom is a video game for the PlayStation 3, and was released on 30 October 2013 in Europe simultaneously with Invizimals: The Alliance.

=== Invizimals: The Resistance ===
Invizimals: The Resistance is an augmented reality video game for the PlayStation Vita. It was released on 29 October 2014 in Europe and on 26 May 2015 in North America.

== Mobile games ==
- Invizimals: Hidden Challenges
- Invizimals: TV Tracker
- Invizimals: New Alliance
- Invizimals: Revolution
- Invizimals: Battle of the Hunters

== Animated Series ==
Invizimals
- Genre: Action; Comedy; Adventure
- Created by: Novarama
- Written by: Alan Keane
- Directed by: Jose Luis Ucha
- Country of origin: Spain; China
- Original languages: Castilian; Catalan; English
- No. of seasons: 1
- No. of episodes: 26

Production
- Executive producers: Dani Sanchez-Crespo; Carlos Biern; Pete Smith
- Producers: John McLaughlin; Claudia Biern Boyd; David Montero
- Running time: 22 minutes
- Production companies: BRB International; Screen21 Media; Televisión Española; Corporació Catalana de Mitjans Audiovisuals; Sony Computer Entertainment; Digital Sky

Original release
- Network: Clan; Super3
- Release: 6 December 2013

In September 2012, Sony Computer Entertainment Europe announced that a 26 episode Invizimals computer animated series would be produced by BRB International. The show was created by BRB's Screen21 division and Novarama, who are both based in Barcelona, with writers from North America and animation done in China. It billed itself as the first augmented-reality cartoon TV series, with on-screen scannable markers that would unlock content in Invizimals: The Alliance on PlayStation Vita and the Invizimals: TV Tracker app for iOS and Android devices.

The series launched in Spain on 6 December 2013, with a television movie on Super3 and Clan called Invizimals: The Alliance. A second TV movie, entitled Invizimals: A Tale of Two Dimensions, aired on both channels on 27 and 31 December, respectively. The two films were also released on DVD, iTunes and the PlayStation Store. They would later be broken up into 6 twenty-two minute episodes for reruns. The first regular episodes of the series began airing on Super3 on 29 November and 5 December 2014, on Clan. To promote the debut, local pop singer Abraham Mateo produced a song and music video called "Cazado" (Hunted). The final 13 episodes began airing November 2015.

The series had its English television debut in Australia, when the two TV movies premiered during Eleven's Toasted TV block on 15 December and 22 December 2013. Episodes that weren't recuts of the TV movies began on 7 June 2015, with the final batch of 13 starting broadcast on 15 October 2016. The first 13 episodes became available to stream on Netflix in the United States, Canada, the United Kingdom and various other countries on 1 July 2015, under the name Invizimals: The Alliance Files. Invizimals began airing on Primo TV in the US on 17 January 2017.

In addition to English, Catalan and Spanish, the series has been dubbed into Arabic, Brazilian Portuguese, Croatian, Czech, Dutch, French, German, Greek, Hungarian, Italian, Japanese, Polish, Portuguese, Romanian and Russian for broadcast on Jeem TV, Megamax, Multimania, Gulli, K2, Star Channel, SIC and other channels around the world.

== Merchandising ==
The franchise has spawned a number of products launched in Europe. In 2010, Spanish toy company Comansi secured the license to produce a series of collectible figurines based on the franchise. That same year, Panini signed on for sticker albums and trading cards in Spain and Portugal, Edibas Collection agreed to produce trading cards and figures in Italy, while Safta produced school supplies for the Iberian market. In 2011, Panini launched a line of sticker albums and cards that featured augmented reality connectivity with Invizimals and Invizimals: Shadow Zone. With sales surpassing 6 million units, the company then licensed the brand for all territories in Europe. Between 2011 and 2016, Panini published a 37 issue Invizimals magazine that featured tips, comics and previews for upcoming games. In 2013, IMC Toys acquired the global master license to produce toys based on the series.

Some of the merchandise has launched with direct video game tie-ins by Novarama and Sony Computer Entertainment Europe. Panini's Invizimals: Hidden Challenges trading card range launched in early 2013 alongside an app for PlayStation Portable, PlayStation Vita, iOS and Android that allowed players to experience augmented reality battles using the cards. Within two weeks, it had surpassed 100,000 downloads in Spain and Portugal. As of September 2013, 10 million Hidden Challenges cards were sold with downloads topping 500,000. This was followed up with a separate app for the New Alliance line in 2014. IMC's toyline features the ability to scan the figurines into the Invizimals: Revolution app. This functionality was also included in a patch for Invizimals: The Alliance.

As of October 2014, Panini has sold 44 million sticker packs and 31 million Invizimals trading cards in Europe.

== See also ==
- The Eye of Judgment, a PlayStation 3 video trading card game which uses the PlayStation Eye for similar augmented reality effects
- Pokémon Go, an augmented reality monster catching game for mobile devices
